= British philosophy =

Philosophical tradition of the British people

British philosophy refers to the philosophical tradition of the British Isles, Great Britain, and the British people, a part of British culture.

The universities of Oxford and Cambridge both have philosophical traditions dating back to at least the Middle Ages, which include British philosophers like Saint Anselm of Canterbury, Roger Bacon, Duns Scotus, and William of Ockham. Modern British philosophers and schools include Francis Bacon, Thomas Hobbes, the British empiricists, utilitarians, and British idealists. Since the 20th century, British philosophy has been dominated by analytic philosophy, which includes G. E. Moore and Bertrand Russell.

== Characterizations ==
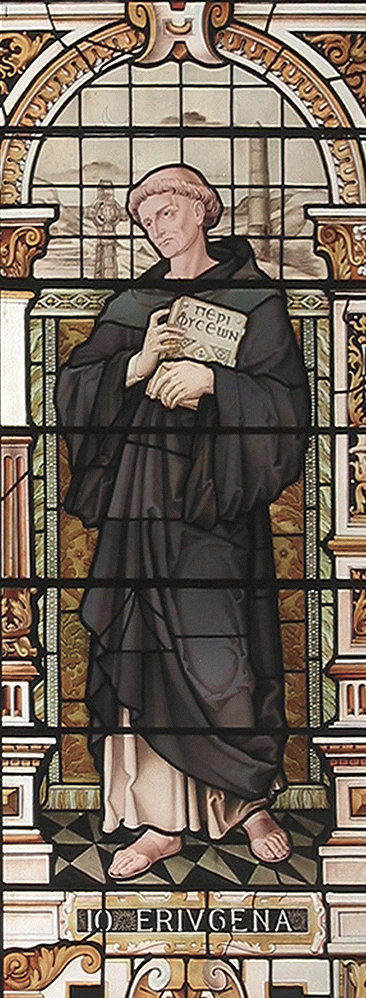
Erigena on a stained glass window in the chapel of Emmanuel College, Cambridge.

According to one author "The native characteristics of British philosophy are these: common sense, dislike of complication, a strong preference for the concrete over the abstract and a certain awkward honesty of method in which an occasional pearl of poetry is embedded".

According to American pragmatist Charles Sanders Peirce: "From very early times, it has been the chief intellectual characteristics of the English to wish to effect everything by the plainest and directest means, without unnecessary contrivance...In philosophy, this national tendency appears as a strong preference for the simplest theories, and a resistance to any complication of the theory as long as there is the least possibility that the facts can be explained in the simpler way. And, accordingly, British philosophers have always desired to weed out of philosophy all conceptions which could not be made perfectly definite and easily intelligible, and have shown strong nominalistic tendencies since the time of Edward I, or even earlier."

Bertrand Russell wrote: "The British are distinguished among the nations of modern Europe, on the one hand by the excellence of their philosophers, and on the other hand by their contempt for philosophy. In both respects they show their wisdom."

== Medieval ==
Medieval philosophy was in Latin and very much a part of Christian philosophy and theology. It was also much concerned with the problem of universals, inherited from antiquity.

=== Platonism ===
The Old English Boethius translation was once attributed to King Alfred (r. 870–899), and this was long accepted, but the attribution is now considered doubtful. The Roman neoplatonist Boethius wrote The Consolation of Philosophy (524) and influenced philosophy with his dictum to "join faith to reason".

==== John Scotus Erigena ====
John Scotus Erigena (c. 800–c. 877) was a mystical neoplatonist from Ireland, who translated and made commentaries upon the work of Pseudo Dionysius the Areopagite. He succeeded Charlemagne's scholar Alcuin of York (c. 735–804) as head of the Palace School at Aachen during the Carolingian Renaissance. Bertrand Russell dubbed him "the most astonishing person of the ninth century". The Stanford Encyclopedia of Philosophy states that "He is generally recognized to be both the outstanding philosopher (in terms of originality) of the Carolingian era and of the whole period of Latin philosophy stretching from Boethius to Anselm".

==== Anselm of Canterbury ====
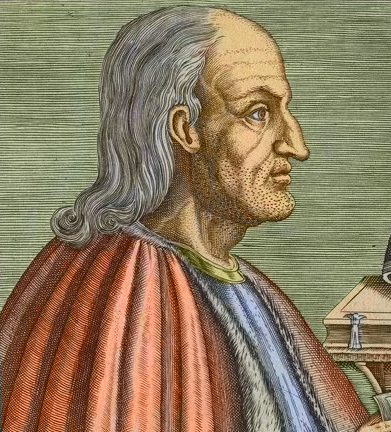
A colourised 16th-century portrait of Anselm, Archbishop of Canterbury

Saint Anselm of Canterbury (c. 1033–1109) held the office of Archbishop of Canterbury and is best known for the Proslogion (c. 1078) which contains the ontological argument for the existence of God, and the satisfaction theory of atonement.

Anselm was previously at the French abbey of Bec, which had been supported by followers of William the Conqueror and enriched with extensive properties in England following the Battle of Hastings (1066). (Note: Bec also owned and managed St Neots Priory, now in Cambridgeshire, as well as a number of other British foundations, including Goldcliff Priory in Monmouthshire founded in 1113 by Robert de Chandos. The village of Tooting Bec, now a London suburb in Wandsworth, is so named because the abbey owned the land.)

==== Adelard of Bath ====
Adelard of Bath (c. 1080–c. 1150) may be the first philosopher from England. He is best known as the translator of Euclid's Elements, and was one of the first to introduce the Arabic numeral system to Europe. He also translated the astronomical tables of al-Khwarizmi. Robert of Chester also translated al-Khwarizmi.

Adelard was a follower of French philosopher Walter of Mortagne (c. 1100–1174), leader of the "indifferentists", a type of platonist who attempts to avoid the more extreme forms of platonism, and according to whom the universal it itself indifferent, changing according to points of view.

==== John of Salisbury ====
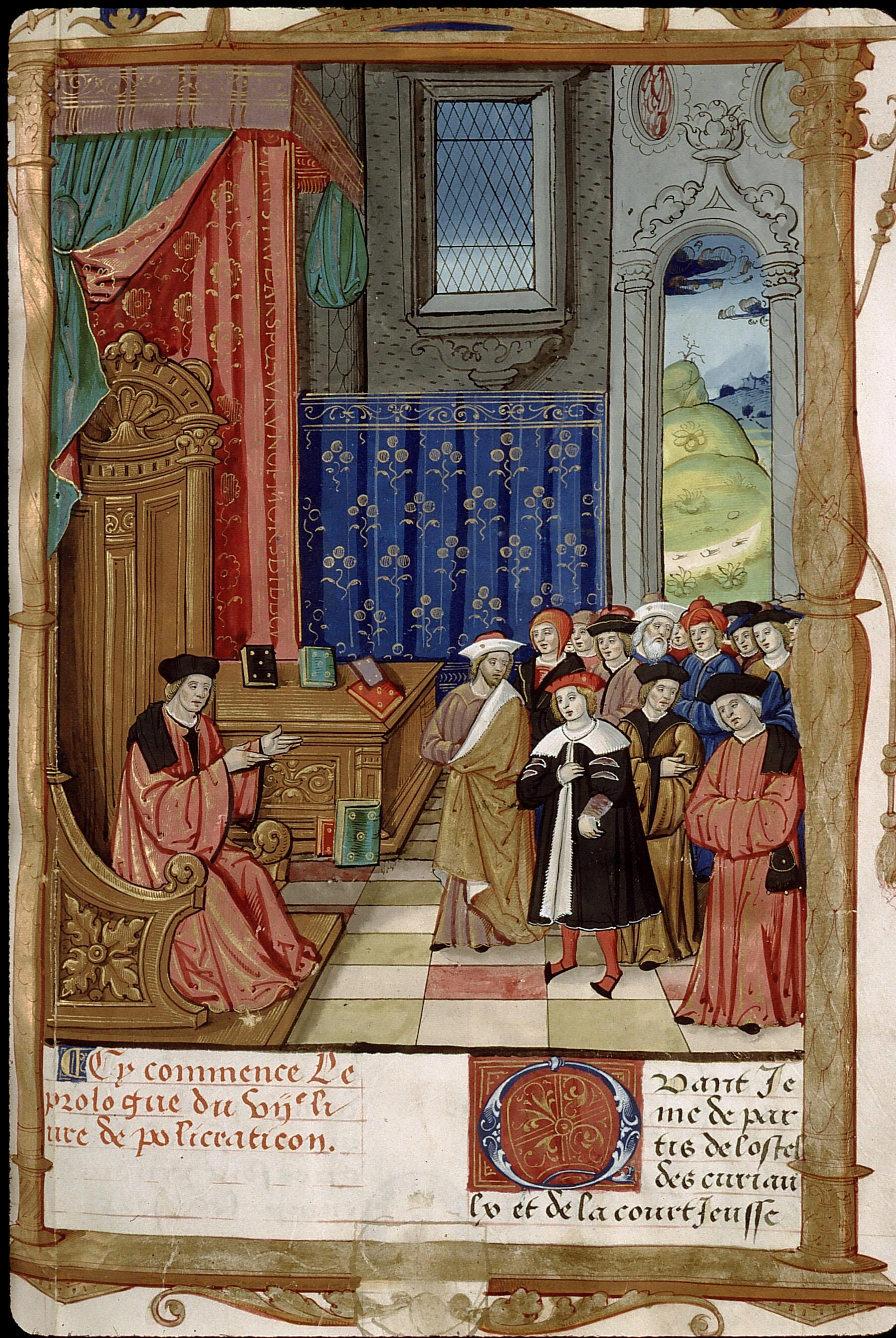
16th-century depiction of John of Salisbury teaching.

John of Salisbury (late 1110s–1180) was one of the most notable figures of the twelfth century Renaissance during the High Middle Ages. He was made Bishop of Chartres and advocated Cicero's academic skepticism. John of Salisbury wrote the Policraticus (c. 1159) and the Metalogicon.

=== Aristotelianism ===
Alfred of Sareshel, Daniel of Morley (c. 1140–c. 1210), and Michael Scot (c. 1175–c. 1232) traveled to Toledo, known for its school of translators of Greek and Arabic sources. Michael Scot translated Aristotle, Avicenna, and Averroes, and was the greatest public intellectual of his day.

==== Oxford and Cambridge ====
The University of Oxford goes back as far as 1096, and grew rapidly after 1167, when King Henry II temporarily prohibited students from attending the University of Paris. After conflicts between students and townspeople, some Oxford academics fled northeast and established the University of Cambridge in 1209. Both universities share much in common and are jointly referred to as Oxbridge.

==== John Blund ====
John Blund (c. 1175–1248) taught at Oxford alongside Edmund of Abingdon (c. 1174–1240). Blund is called by medieval historian Maurice Powicke the "first English Aristotelian." Blund wrote Tractatus de Anima (c. 1200), one of the first Western philosophy works to make use of De Anima by Aristotle, and Avicenna's work also called De Anima.

==== Alexander Neckam ====
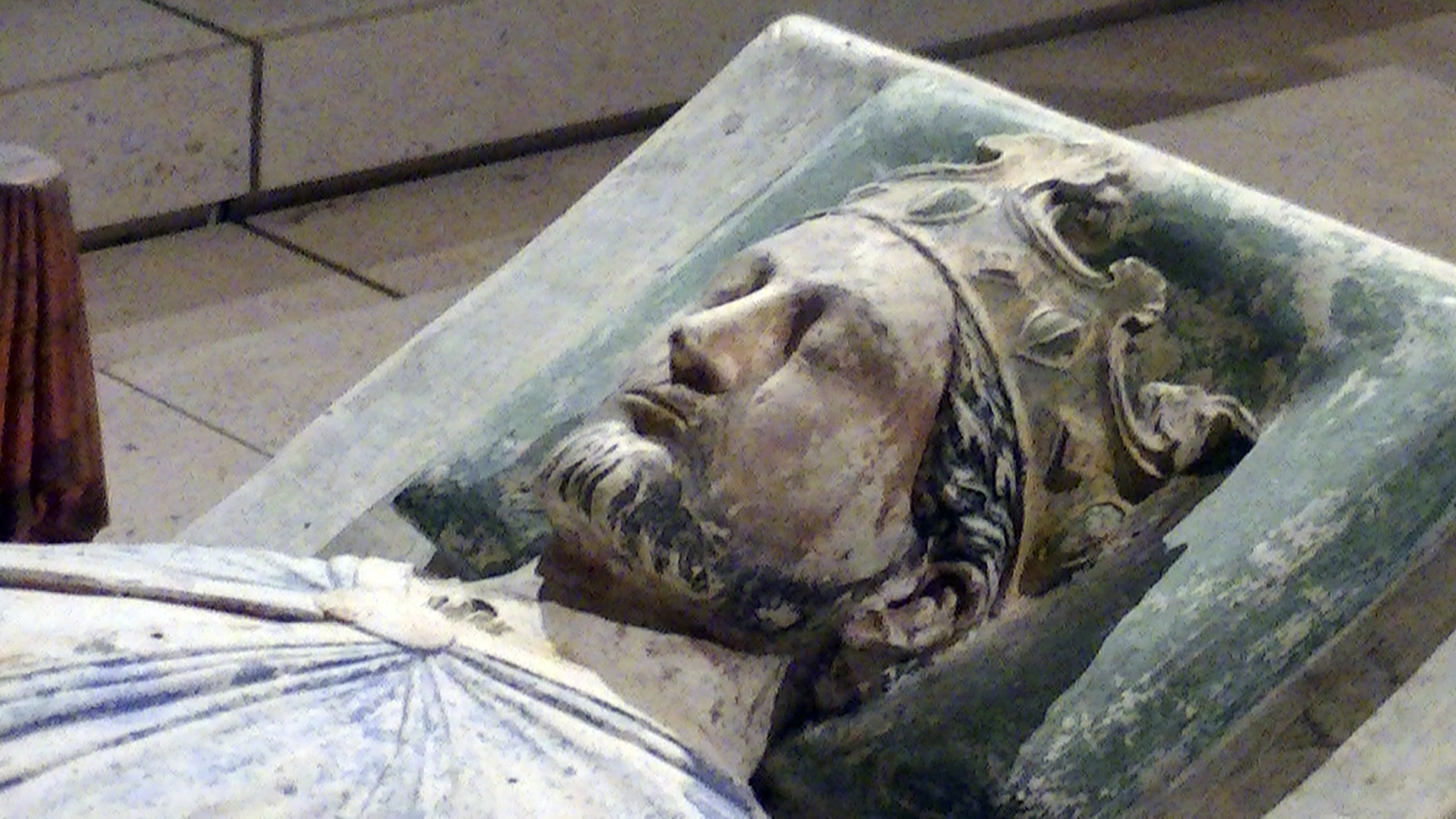
Alexander Neckam was the foster-brother of Richard the Lionhearted

Alexander Neckam (1157–1217) was the foster-brother of Richard the Lionhearted and an abbot of Cirencester who taught at Oxford. Neckam blended Christianity with Platonic cosmology, such as in the Timaeus; but was also influenced by Blund; On the Nature of Things (c. 1190) relays natural philosophy (science) such as biology learned from Aristotle and Arabic sources. Neckam contributed the earliest European description of the compass.

In Speculum speculationum (c. 1215), Alexander combats the Cathar heresy, particularly its belief in dualism, and applies dialectic logic. Oxford's Adam of Bockenfield (c. 1220–1293) and Richard Rufus of Cornwall (d. c. 1260) also wrote on Aristotle.

=== Alexander of Hales ===
Alexander of Hales (c. 1185–1245) given the scholastic accolade Doctor Irrefragibilis (Latin: "Irrefutable Teacher") introduced Peter Lombard's Sentences (c. 1150) as the textbook at the University of Paris. He believed in free will, and became a Franciscan, according to Roger Bacon "edifying the world and giving new status to the Order."

=== Robert Grosseteste ===
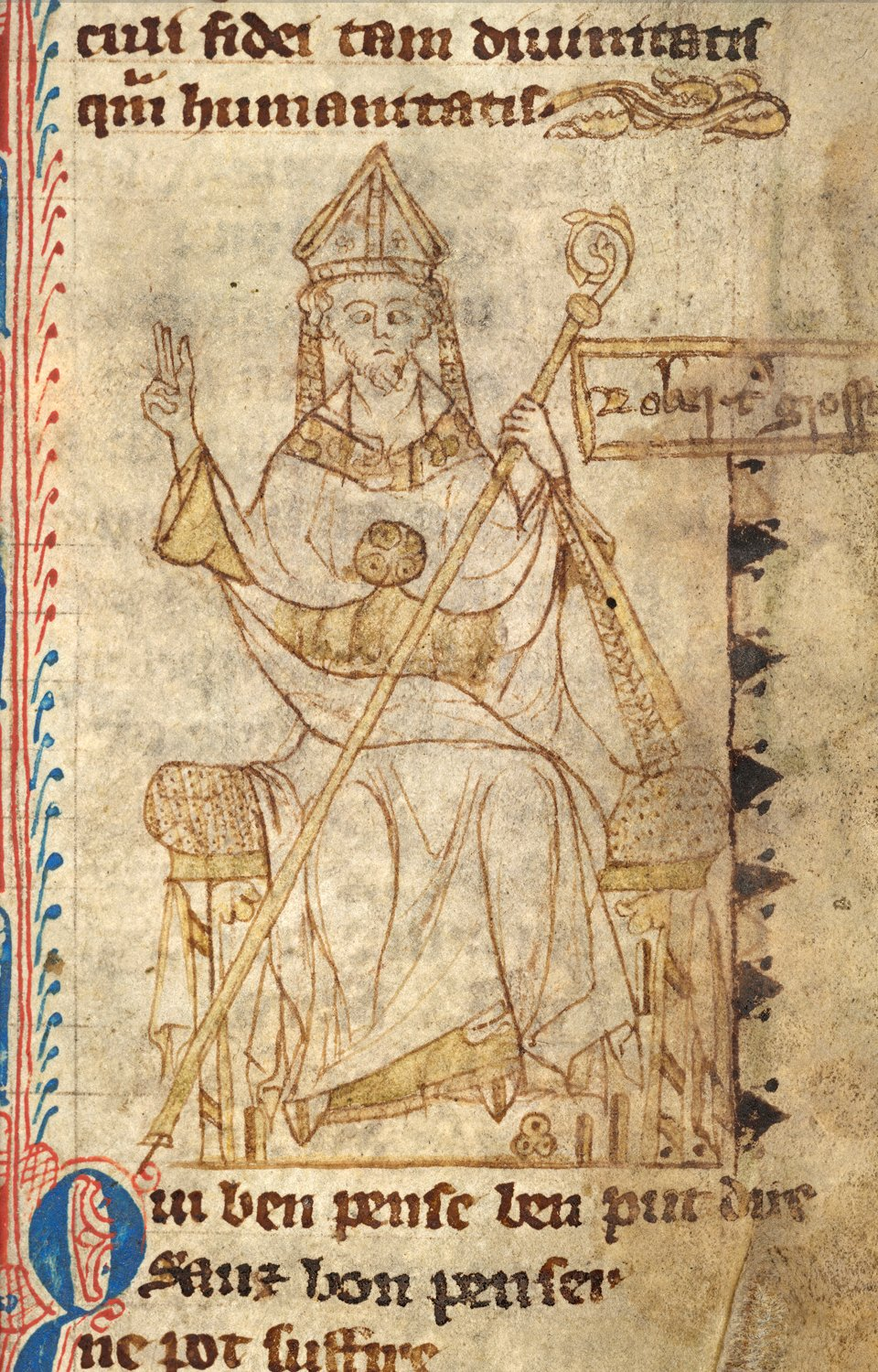
Robert Grosseteste from an early 14th-century portrait.

Historian A. C. Crombie called Robert Grosseteste (c. 1170–1253) "the real founder of the tradition of scientific thought in medieval Oxford, and in some ways, of the modern English intellectual tradition". Grosseteste studied optics and the "metaphysics of light", identifying light with Aristotelian form in such works as On Light. (Note: cf. Genesis 1:3 "And God said, 'Let there be light,' and there was light".)

Grosseteste was friends with Adam Marsh (c. 1200–1259). Oxford's Richard Fishacre (c. 1200–1248) was influenced by Grosseteste, and wrote a commentary of Sentences. Bartholomaeus Anglicus (1202–1272) is also believed to have studied under Grosseteste.

=== William of Sherwood ===
William of Sherwood (c. 1200–1272) was an English logician and teacher. Little is known of his life, but he is thought to have studied in Paris and was a master at Oxford in 1252. He was the author of two books which were an important influence on the development of scholastic terminist logic in both Britain and on the continent: Introduction to Logic and Syncategoremata, the first known works on supposition theory. (Note: According to Roger Bacon, Sherwood was among "the more famous wise men of Christendom", of whom he names another as Albertus Magnus. Bacon judged Sherwood to be "much wiser than Albert".) Syncategoremata were terms like "and", "or", and "not" which merely combine other terms, while categoremata belong to one of Aristotle's Categories and are genuine predicates. A treatise on "insolubles" or paradoxes like the Liar Paradox was also attributed to William of Sherwood.

=== Roger Bacon ===
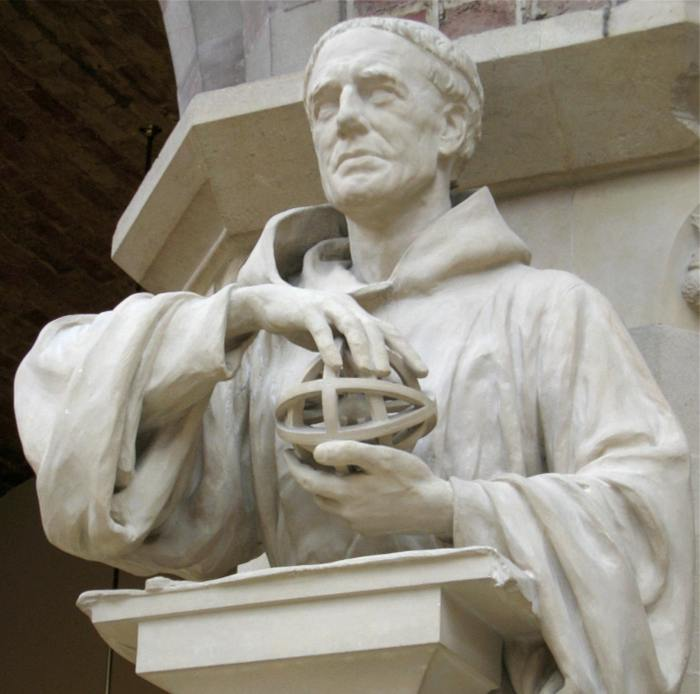
Statue of Roger Bacon at the Oxford University Museum of Natural History

Roger Bacon (c. 1214–1294), also known as Doctor Mirabilis (Latin: "Wondrous Doctor"), was an English Franciscan friar, who commented on Aristotle, Avicenna, and Averroes. His views are found in works like the Opus Majus, Opus Minus, and Opus Tertium (1267).

Roger Bacon was highly influenced by Aristotle's Metaphysics, but his view on universals is debated among scholars, and so is resolved as "both ‘extreme-realism’ and proto-nominalism". He also wrote The Art and Science of Logic, and is the great British contributor to Aristotle's logic of the period, along with William of Sherwood.

Roger Bacon was influenced by Grosseteste and Marsh. He studied optics, astronomy, and alchemy, and is credited as an early advocate of science. He was the first European to describe gunpowder, and also proposed early flying machines like hot-air balloons and an ornithopter.

Roger Bacon influenced modistae like Ralph of Beauvais, who studied under Frenchman Peter Abelard in Paris. Roger Bacon also influenced Archbishop of Canterbury John Peckham (c. 1230– 1292), who taught Roger Marston (d. c. 1303).

=== Duns Scotus ===
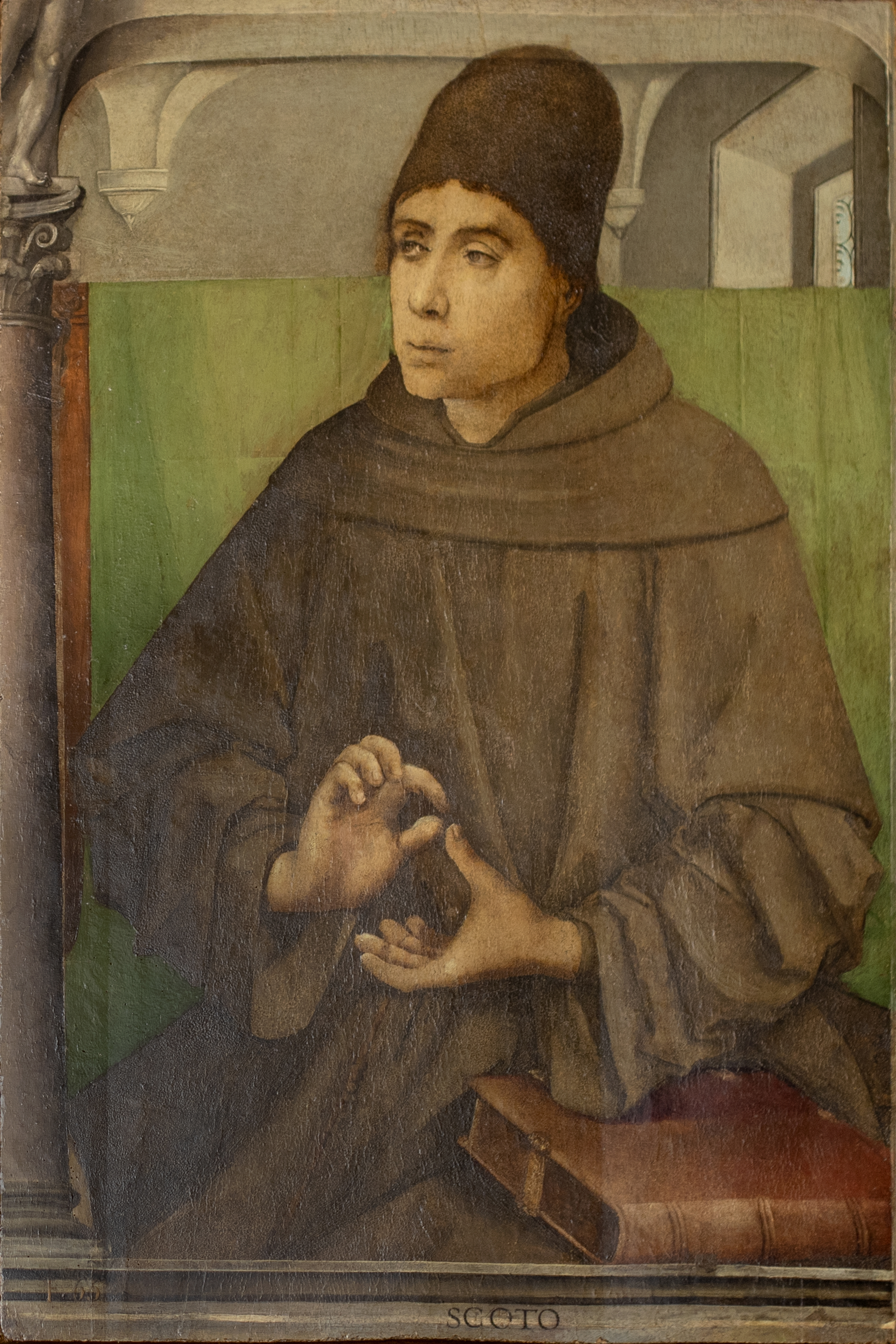
Duns Scotus

John Duns Scotus (c. 1265–1308) also known as Doctor Subtilis (Latin: "Subtle Doctor") was from Duns, in Berwickshire, Scotland. In 1291 he was ordained a priest in Northampton, England. A note in Codex 66 of Merton College, Oxford records that Scotus "flourished at Cambridge, Oxford and Paris". Scotus's view of preservative redemption and Immaculate Conception was declared dogma by Pope Pius IX. He was beatified by Pope John Paul II.

Scotus was a realist best known for the univocity of being, the formal distinction, and the idea of haecceity. The Scotist view of the univocity of being contrasts with the Thomist view of the equivocity of being and analogia entis, held by Italian Thomas Aquinas. Scotus held being is the most abstract concept and applicable to everything that exists. The British Thomists included William of Hotham, Richard of Clapwell, and Thomas of Sutton.

The formal distinction is a distinction that is intermediate between a merely conceptual distinction, and a logical distinction that is fully real or mind-independent. Haecceity is the idea of "thisness," a concept which denotes the discrete qualities, properties or characteristics of a thing which make it a particular thing.

Thomas Wilton studied under Scotus. Walter Burley (c. 1275–1345) studied under Wilton. Burley was a noted logician.

=== Oxford Calculators ===
Thomas Bradwardine (c. 1300–1349) was a follower of Scotus who with Richard Swineshead (fl. c. 1340–1354), William Heytesbury (c. 1313–1373) , and John Dumbleton (c. 1310–1349) formed the Oxford Calculators, who were influenced by Burley. As well as using logic in philosophical and theological disputes, they studied mathematics and physics. Influenced by French thinkers Gerard of Brussels and Nicole Oresme, they studied acceleration or "uniform difform motion."

=== William of Ockham ===
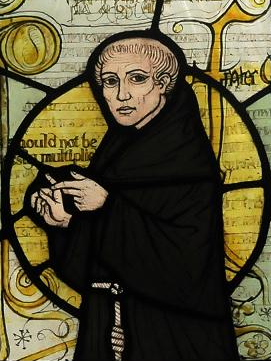
Ockham depicted on a stained glass window.

William of Ockham (c. 1288–c. 1348) was an English Franciscan friar and scholastic philosopher. Ockham advocated nominalism as a solution to the problem of universals in such works as Summa Logicae (1323).

He is perhaps best known for his principle of parsimony, famously known as Ockham's razor. This actual term is claimed not to appear in his writings, but rather summarizes the principle he expressed in passages such as Plurality must never be posited without necessity and It is futile to do with more things that which can be done with fewer. (Note: The words often attributed to Occam: entia non sunt multiplicanda praeter necessitatem ("entities must not be multiplied beyond necessity") are absent in his extant works; This particular phrasing comes from Irishman John Punch who used it in describing a "common axiom" (axioma vulgare) of the Scholastics.) Generally it refers to distinguishing between two hypotheses, with the metaphor of a razor used either by "shaving away" unnecessary assumptions or cutting apart two similar conclusions.

Ockham had followers like Robert Holcot (c. 1290–1349), Adam of Wodeham (1298–1358), and William Crathorn (fl. c. 1330). Holcot also known as Doctor firmus et indefatigabilis (Latin: "strong and tireless doctor") died of the Black plague. Walter Chatton (c. 1290–1343) was Ockham's intellectual rival. Crathorn and Chatton both criticized Aristotelian notions of space.

Ockham's followers influenced Pelagians like Thomas of Buckingham and Uthred of Boldon (c. 1320–1397). Ockham spent his final years taking refuge with Louis IV, Holy Roman Emperor at the Alter Hof in Munich, and his work also influenced French and German philosophy.

=== John Wycliffe ===
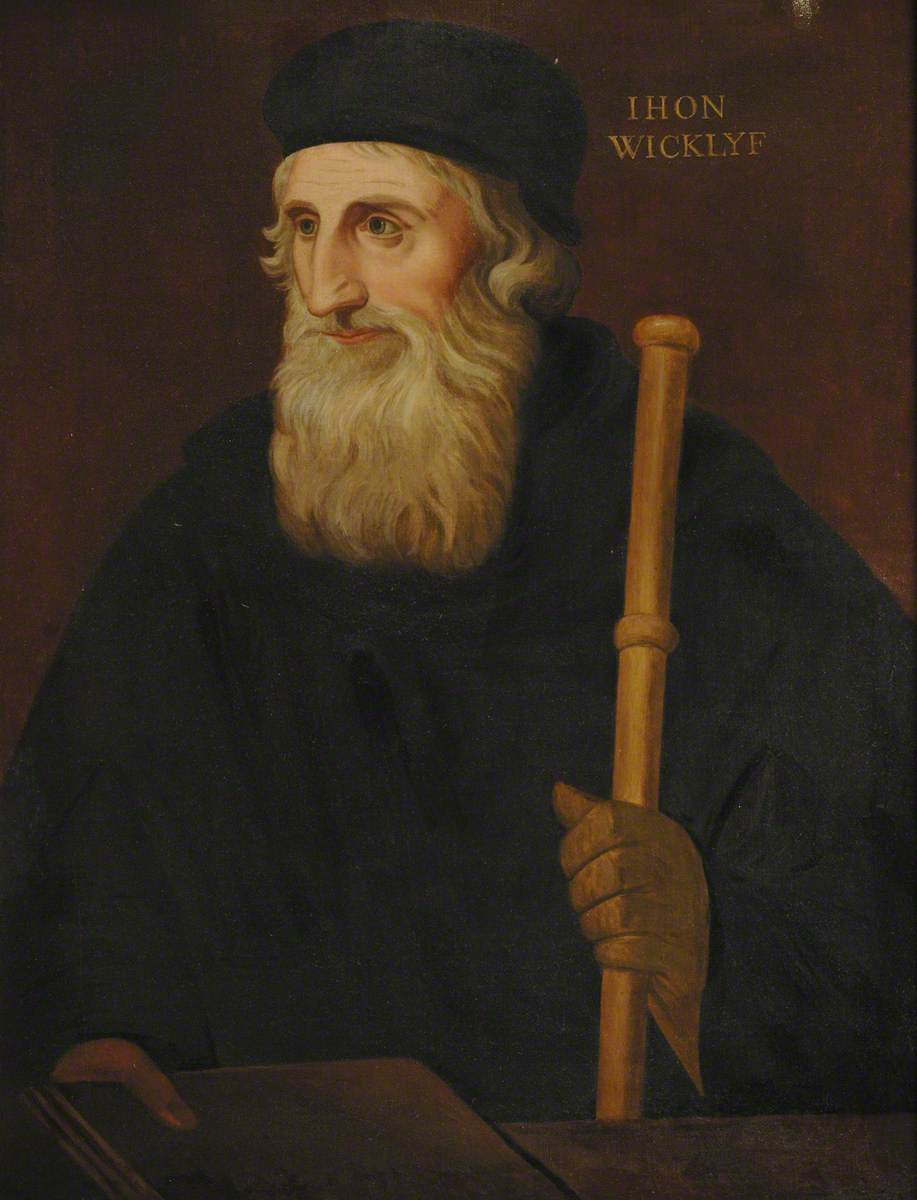
John Wycliffe

John Wycliffe (1328–1384) was one of the last scholastics, and an important predecessor of Protestantism. Wycliffe led the Lollards, who were opposed by scholastic Reginald Pecock (c. 1395–c. 1461), who was influenced by Holcot. German Reformation pioneer Martin Luther accepted in his Assertio that Wycliffe taught that "all events occur by absolute necessity." (Note: However, other scholars now dispute this characterization: according to the Stanford Encyclopedia of Philosophy he maintained "simultaneously the necessity of all that happens and human freedom (cf. Tractatus de universalibus, ch. 14, pp. 333–47); and many times he affirms that it would be heretical to say that all things happen by absolute necessity...")

=== Medieval mysticism ===
Hermit Richard Rolle (c. 1300–1349) was a mystic, whose disciple was anchoress Margaret Kirkby (c. 1322–c. 1392). Another mystic was the anonymous Neoplatonist author of The Cloud of Unknowing. There were also anchoress Julian of Norwich (c. 1343–c. 1418), author of Revelations of Divine Love, and Walter Hilton (c. 1340–1396).

== Modern ==
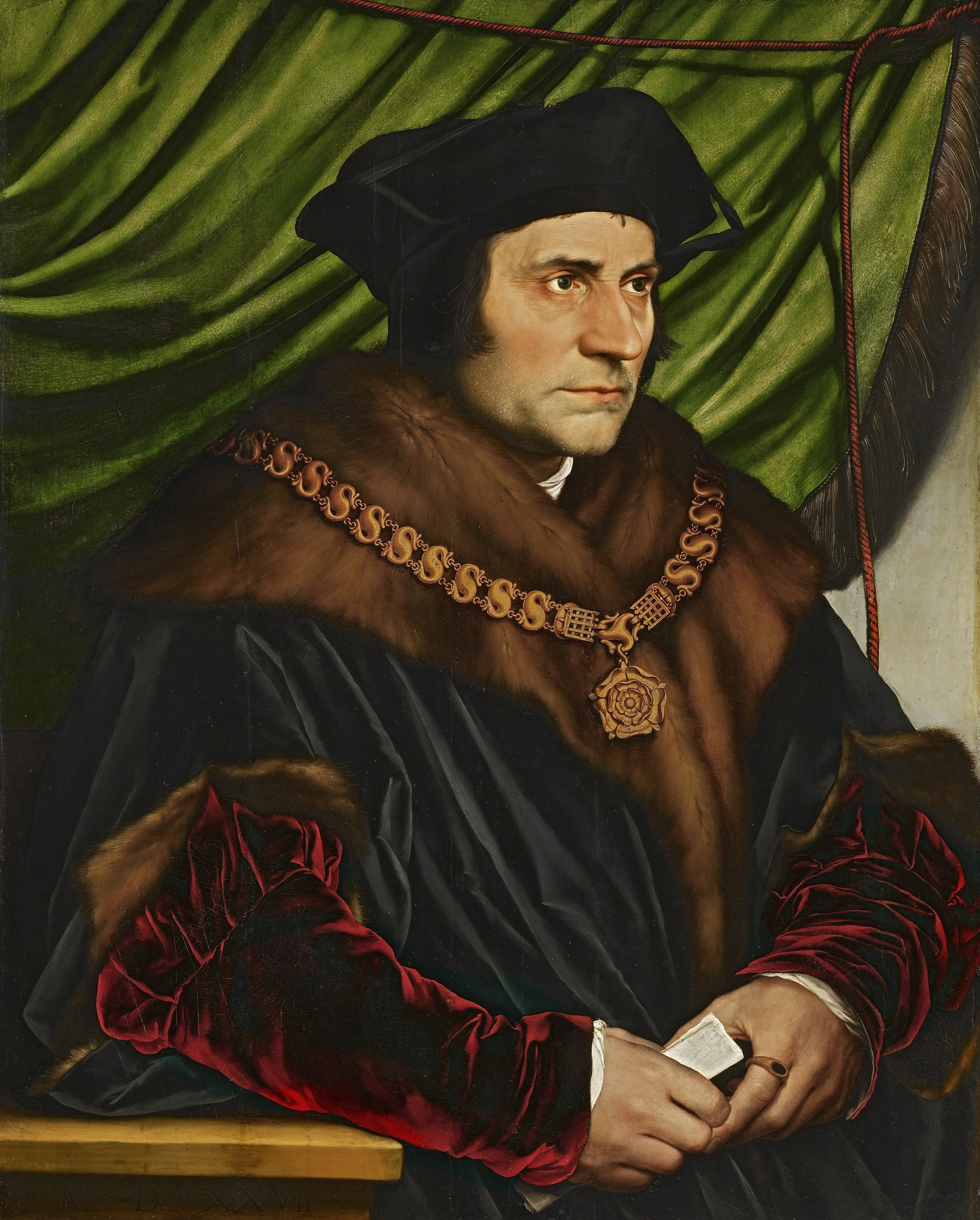
Thomas More

=== Renaissance and Reformation ===
==== Thomas More ====
Renaissance humanist Thomas More (1478–1535) wrote Utopia (1516), which describes the political system of an imaginary island state. More opposed the Protestant Reformation and separation from the Catholic Church by King Henry VIII, who dissolved the monasteries. More was convicted of treason and beheaded at Tower Hill. Pope Pius XI canonised More in 1935 as a martyr.

==== Richard Hooker ====
Anglican John Jewel (1522–1571) influenced Richard Hooker (1554–1600), a Thomist who believed the world was governed by natural law. His defense of redeemed reason informed the theology of the Caroline Divines.

==== Renaissance Logic ====
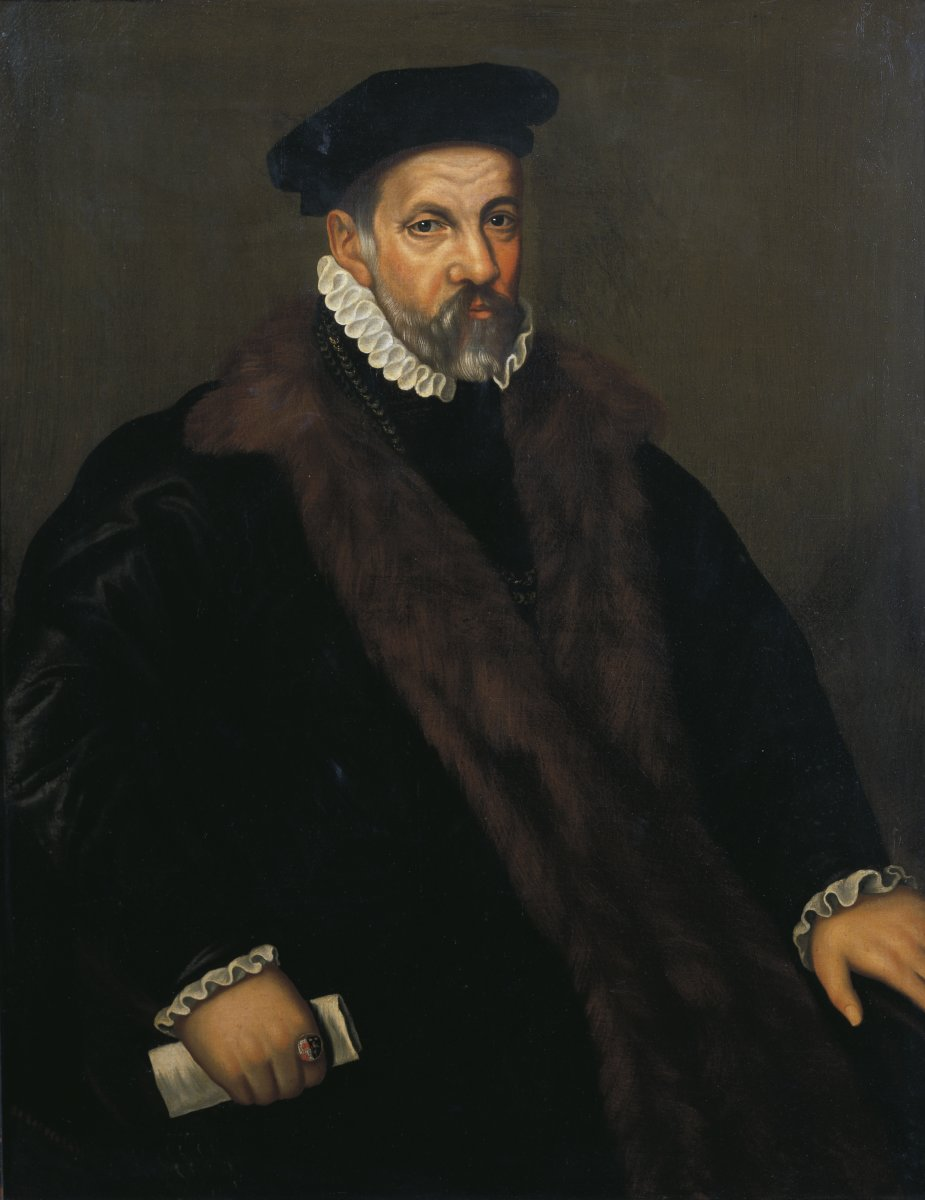
Thomas Wilson, the first logic writer in English.

There were British Renaissance logicians like Thomas Wilson, Ralph Lever, John Seton, John Sanderson, and Richard Crakanthorpe. Thomas Wilson (1524–1581) wrote Logique (1551) and The Arte of Rhetorique (1553), which have been called "the first complete works on logic and rhetoric in English". Ralph Lever (d. c. 1585) wrote The Arte of Reason, rightly termed, Witcraft (1573). The work of John Seton (c. 1498–1567) and John Sanderson (d. 1602) joined Wilson as the standard texts on logic for nearly a century. Richard Crakanthorpe (1567–1624) is alluded to in the novel Tristram Shandy.

==== Ramism ====
At Cambridge, William Temple (1555–1627) defended French logician, educational reformer, and Protestant convert Petrus Ramus against the attacks of Aristotelian and Neoplatonist Everard Digby (c. 1550–c. 1592). According to historian Thomas Fuller, nobody was "better skilled in Aristotle or a greater follower of Ramus" than George Downame (c. 1566—1634). Downame influenced Paradise Lost (1667) author John Milton (1608–1674), who also wrote Art of Logic (1672). Another Ramist was William Ames (1576–1633), especially influential in New England and Colonial America.

==== Mysticism ====
John Pordage

Digby influenced mystic Robert Fludd (1574–1637) and Neoplatonist Robert Greville (1607–1643), a Parliamentarian general in the English Civil War (1642–1651) killed by a Royalist sniper at the Siege of Lichfield.

English dissenter John Pordage (1607–1681) was inspired by German theosophist Jakob Böhme. In 1694, Pordage adherent and universalist visionary Jane Leade (1624–1704), who wrote the spiritual diary A Fountain of Gardens, founded the Philadelphian Society for the Advancement of Piety and Divine Philosophy. (Note: Their name was taken from the Philadelphians mentioned in the Book of Revelation.) The Philadelphian Society included physician Francis Lee, Parliamentarian Roger Crab, prophet Ann Bathurst, and clergyman Richard Roach.

Mysticism influenced the antinomian Ranters, who influenced George Fox (1624–1691), founder of Quakerism. William Law (1686–1761) was an influential mystic. So was poet William Blake (1757–1827).

=== Francis Bacon ===
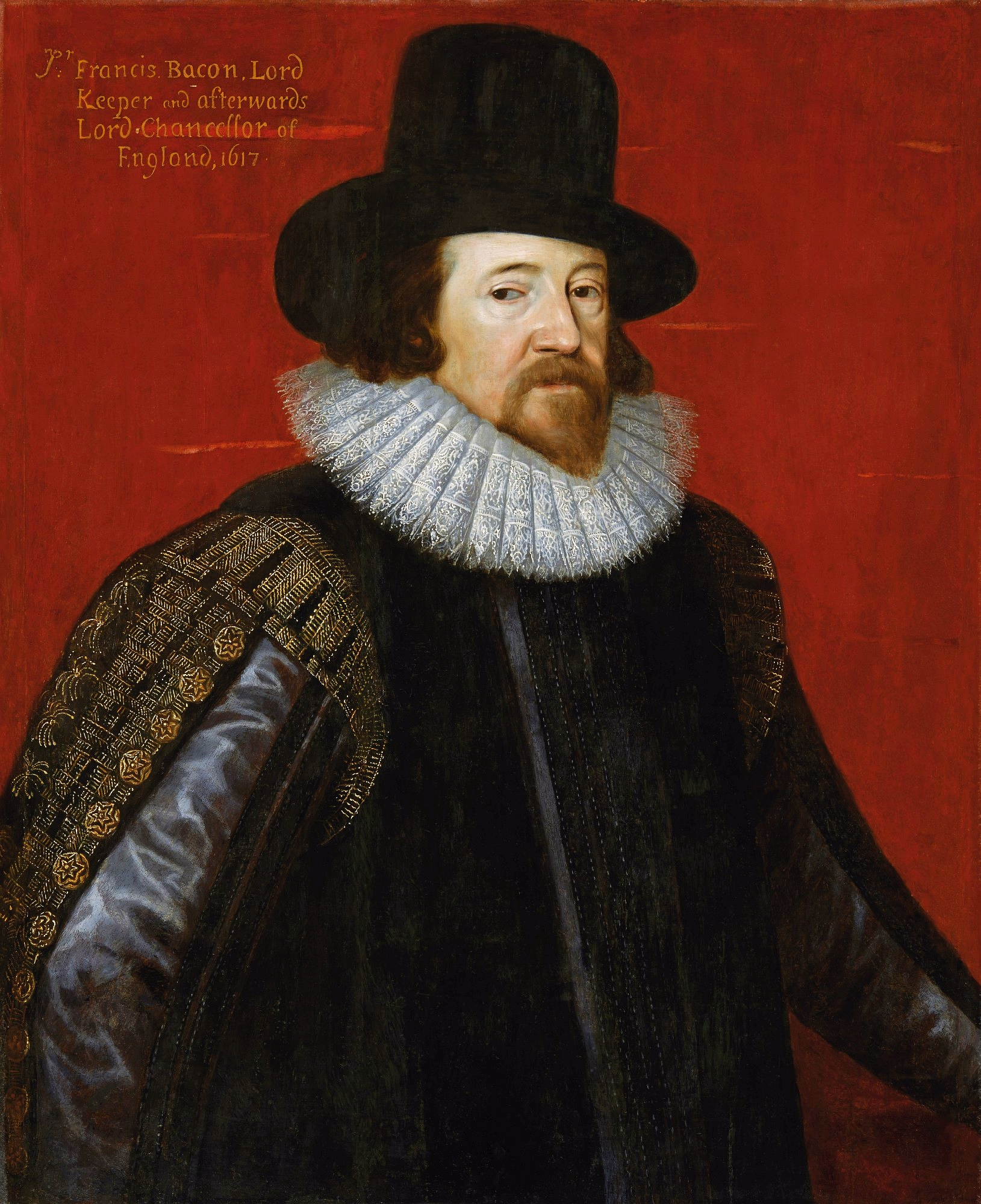
Francis Bacon

Francis Bacon (1561–1626), educated at Trinity College, Cambridge, served as both Attorney General and Lord Chancellor of England. Although his political career ended in disgrace, he remained very influential through his philosophical works.

Francis Bacon was a pivotal figure in the Scientific Revolution and has been called the father of empiricism, the view that knowledge comes from the senses. In works like The Advancement of Learning (1605) and Novum Organum (1620), Francis Bacon argued against Aristotelian approaches to logic and science (the old Organon). He rejected pure a priori deduction, instead demanding experiment, and so established and popularized inductive methodology. This is often called the Baconian method or simply, the scientific method. Quoting him, "Nature to be commanded must be obeyed."

His dedication to experiment probably led to his death. He contracted pneumonia while stuffing a fowl with snow, in order to study the effects of freezing on the preservation of meat. His posthumously published New Atlantis (1626) presents his vision of the future.

==== The Royal Society ====
The Royal Society was founded in 1660, when twelve natural philosophers influenced by Bacon's philosophy met at Gresham College, starting a "Colledge for the Promoting of Physico-Mathematicall Experimentall Learning". Remarkably it included both Parliamentarians (Robert Boyle, John Wilkins, William Petty, Jonathan Goddard, and Abraham Hill) and Royalists (William Ball, William Brouncker, Alexander Bruce, 2nd Earl of Kincardine, Christopher Wren, Robert Moray, and Sir Paul Neile). Lawrence Rooke alludes classification.

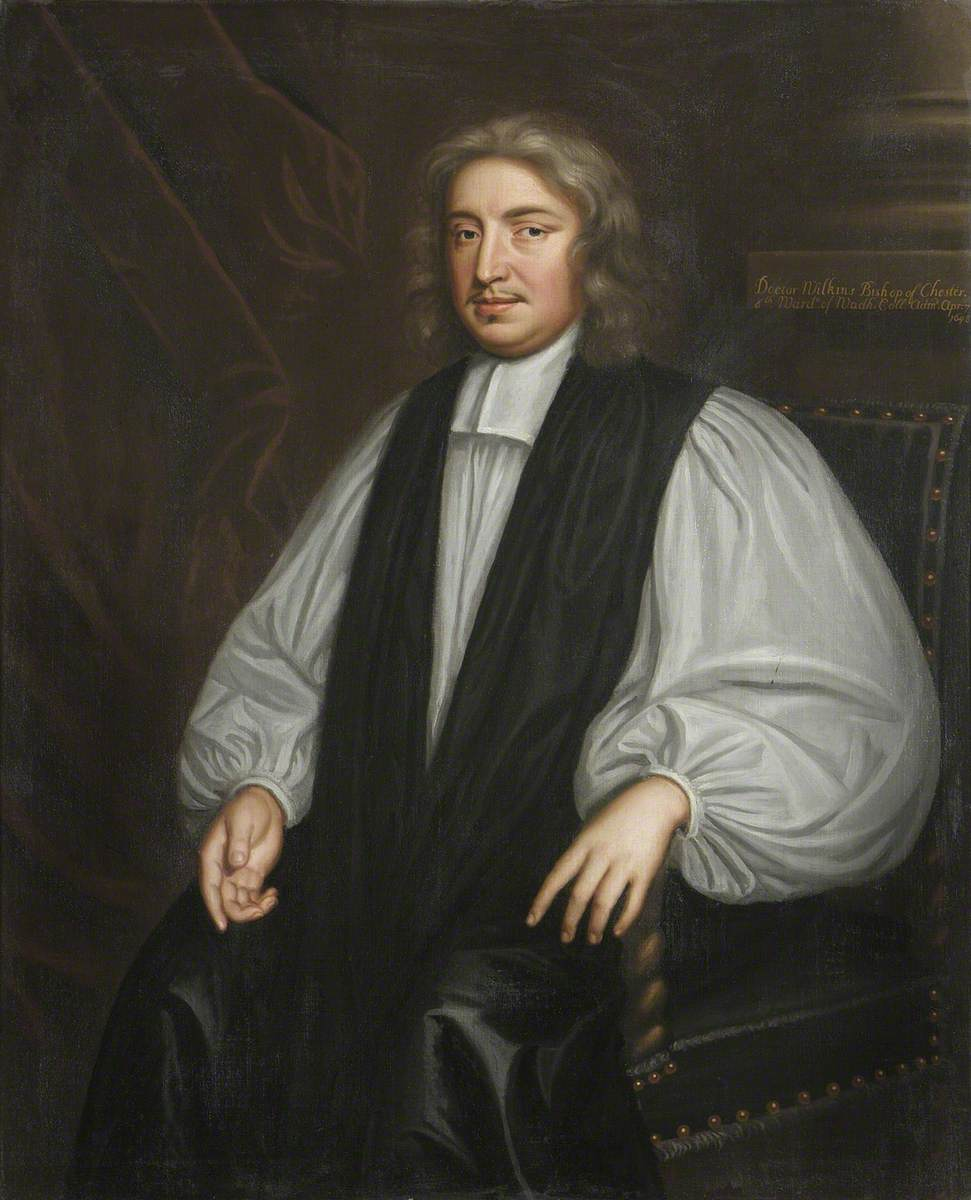
John Wilkins was Oliver Cromwell's brother-in-law.

Bacon's philosophy also influenced predecessor institutions like Gresham College and the Invisible College. Shortly after the end of the First English Civil War, John Wilkins (1614–1672) wrote Mathematicall Magick (1648), and then moved to Oxford, where Wilkins started the Oxford Philosophical Club, active from 1649 to 1660. Not to be confused with the Oxford Philosophical Society, which Robert Plot (1640–1696) started in 1683 at the Ashmolean Museum.

Wilkins was Oliver Cromwell's brother-in-law. William Petty (1623–1687) travelled with Cromwell's army in Ireland as physician-general and is best known for his work on early economics. Jonathan Goddard (1617–1675) was also a physician for Cromwell, one of those attending to him at his death. Alexander Bruce (1629–1681) served as a captain with the Royalist cavalry, fighting at the Battle of Worcester.

Robert Boyle (1627–1691) wrote The Sceptical Chymist (1661) and is considered one of the founders of modern chemistry. He is the namesake of Boyle's law. Boyle rejected the scholastic hylomorphism inherited from Aristotle. He also criticized German hermeticist and alchemist Paracelsus.

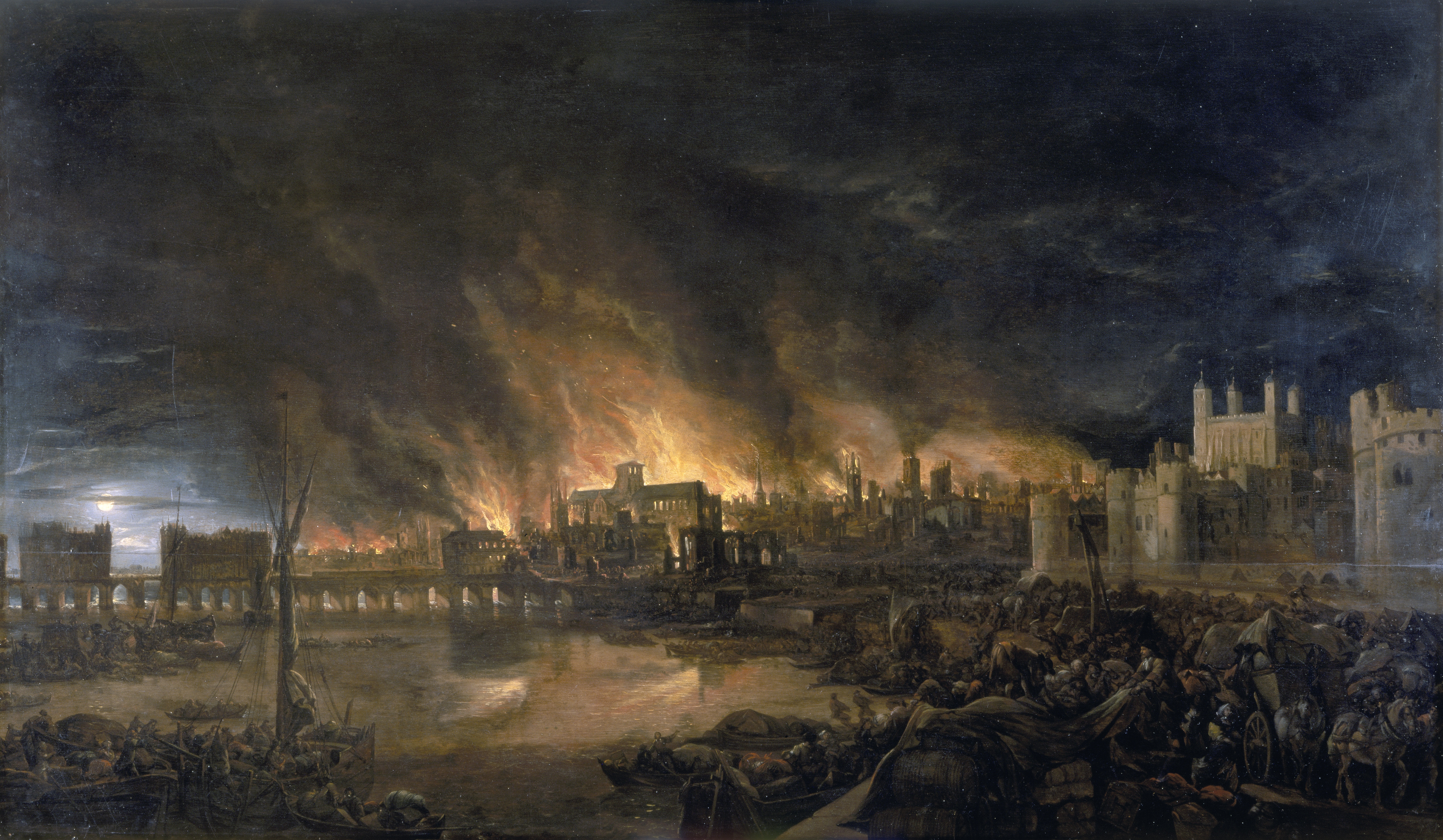
The Great Fire of London depicted by an unknown painter (1675)

In 1662, Parliamentarian Henry Oldenburg (c. 1618–1677) became secretary of the Royal Society. Royalist Walter Charleton (1619–1707) joined in 1663; he followed Frenchman Pierre Gassendi and was "the main conduit for the transmission of Epicurean ideas to England". Royalist John Evelyn (1620–1706), best known for his diary, also joined.

The Royal Society's journal Philosophical Transactions was established in 1665. Christopher Wren (1632–1723) is best known for his architecture done in the English Baroque style after the Great Fire of London (1666), which came soon after the Great Plague (1665-1666). Wren rebuilt 52 churches including St Paul's Cathedral. Wren was also a natural philosopher. His friend Robert Hooke (1635–1703) commented: "Since the time of Archimedes there scarce ever met in one man in so great perfection such a mechanical hand and so philosophical mind."

=== Thomas Hobbes ===
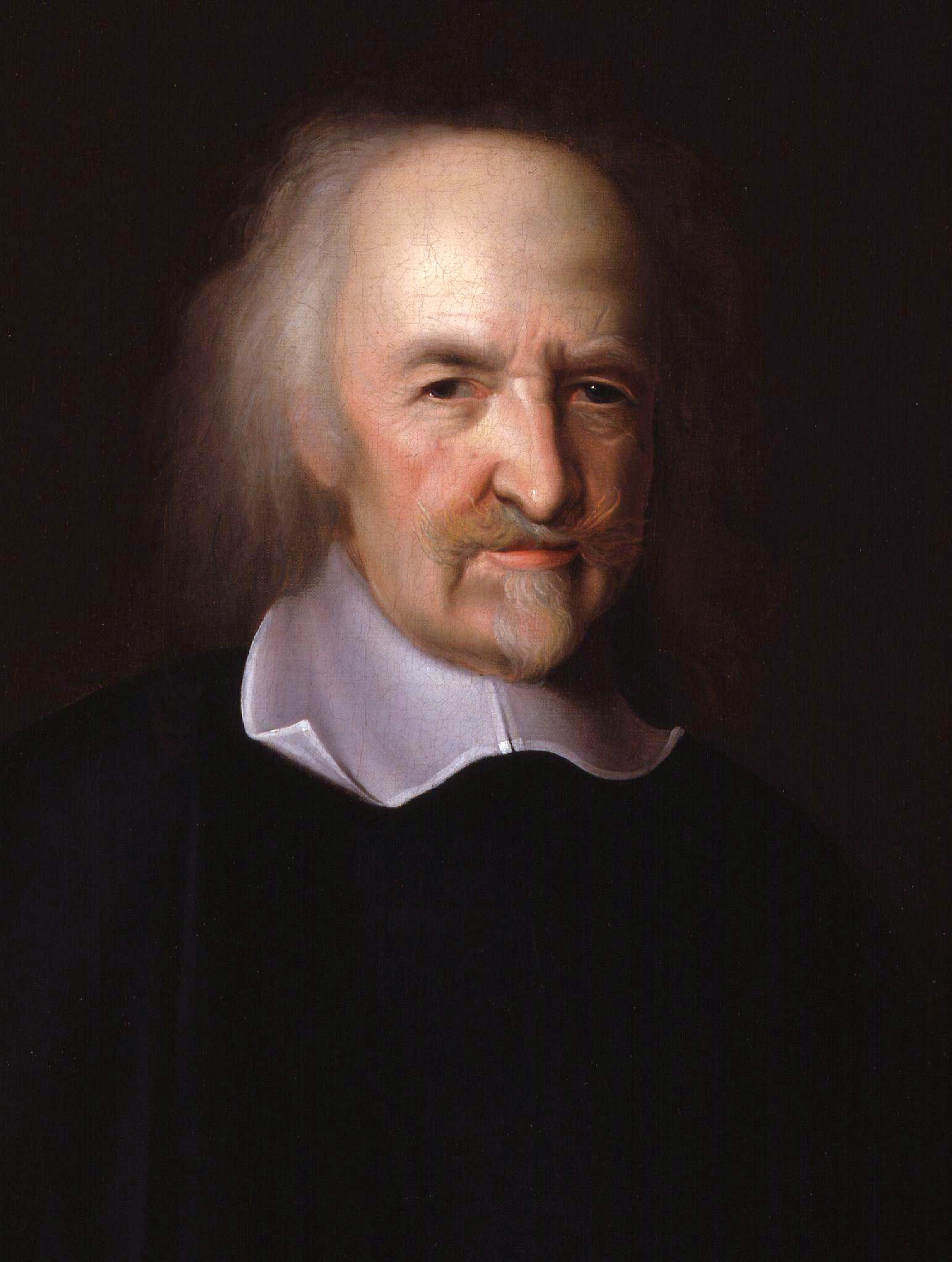
Thomas Hobbes

Thomas Hobbes (1588–1679) was an English philosopher, remembered today for his work on political philosophy. His book Leviathan (1651) established social contract theory. Hobbes argued for a sovereign absolute monarch to save man from the state of nature wherein life was "solitary, poor, nasty, brutish, and short".

Although Hobbes was a champion of monarchy, he also developed some of the fundamentals of European liberal thought: the right of the individual; the natural equality of all men; the artificial character of the political order (which led to the later distinction between civil society and the state); the view that all legitimate political power must be "representative" and based on the consent of the people; and a liberal interpretation of law which leaves people free to do whatever the law does not explicitly forbid.

Hobbes was a materialist, a nominalist, and an egoist, who had an intellectual rivalry with French philosopher and "founder of modern philosophy" and Cartesianism René Descartes (1596–1650). Hobbes influenced Bernard Mandeville (1670–1733), author of The Fable of the Bees (1714).

As well as philosophy, Hobbes contributed to a diverse array of fields, including geometry, the physics of gases, history, and anthropology. His debate with Boyle is traced in Leviathan and the Air-Pump (1985). He also debated mathematician John Wallis.

=== Cambridge Platonism ===
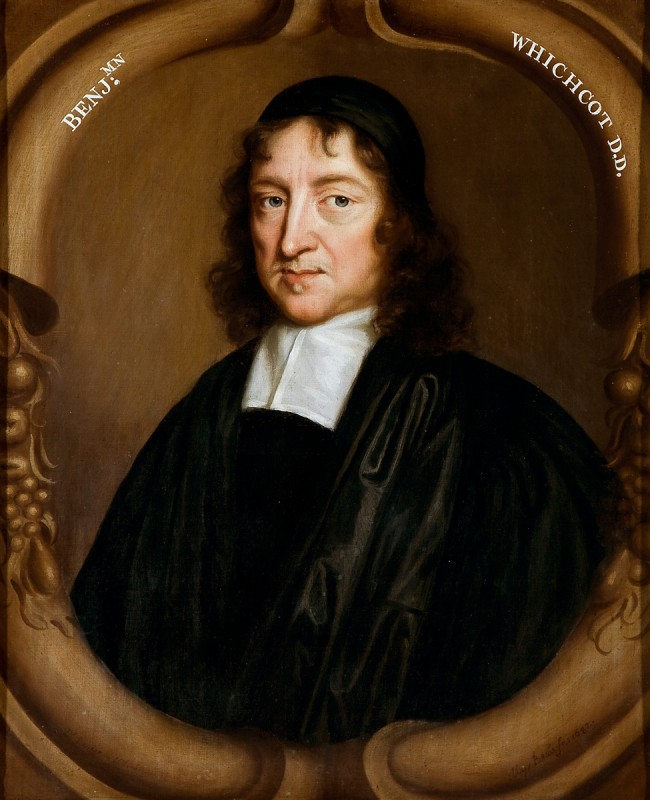
Benjamin Whichcote

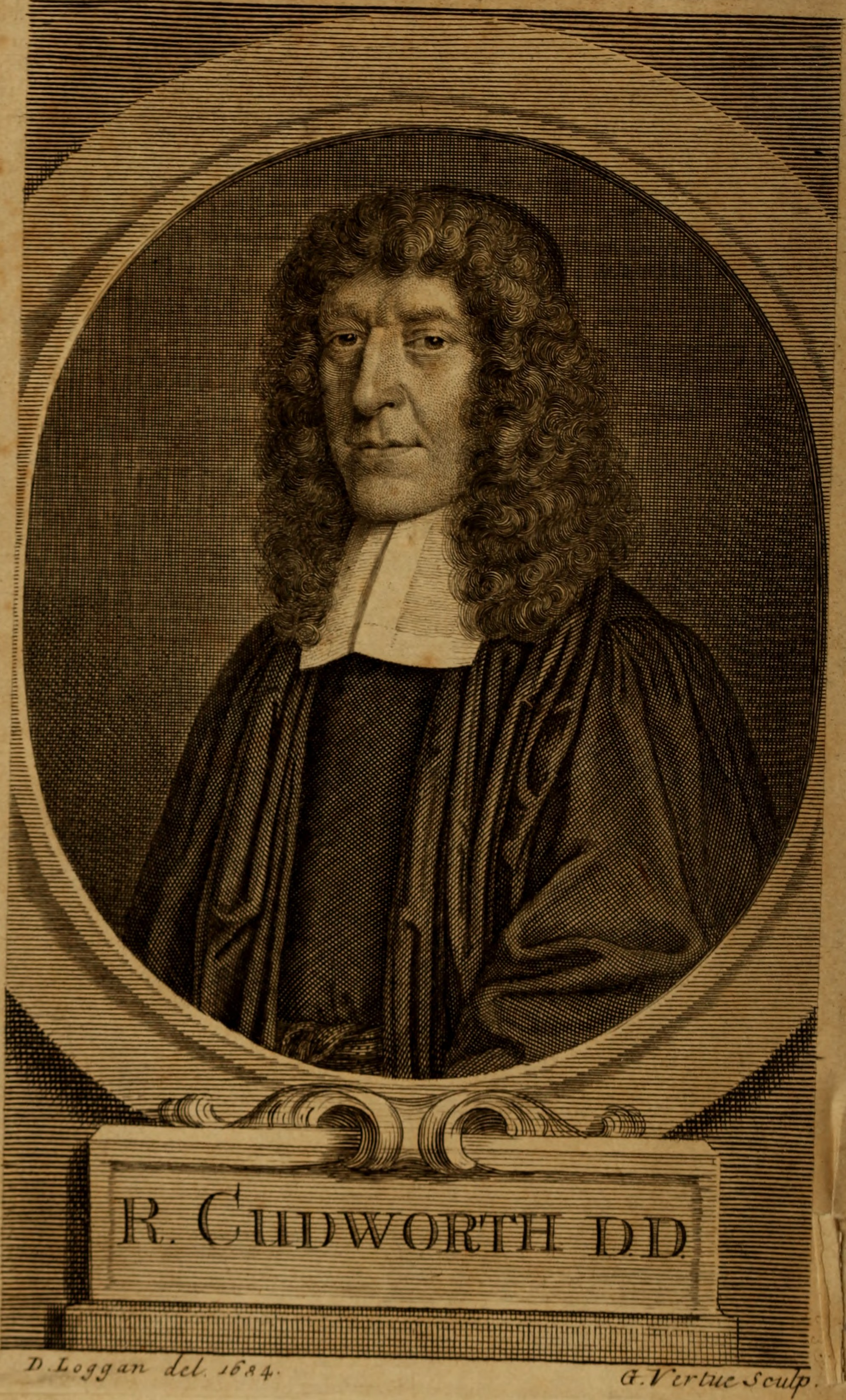
Ralph Cudworth

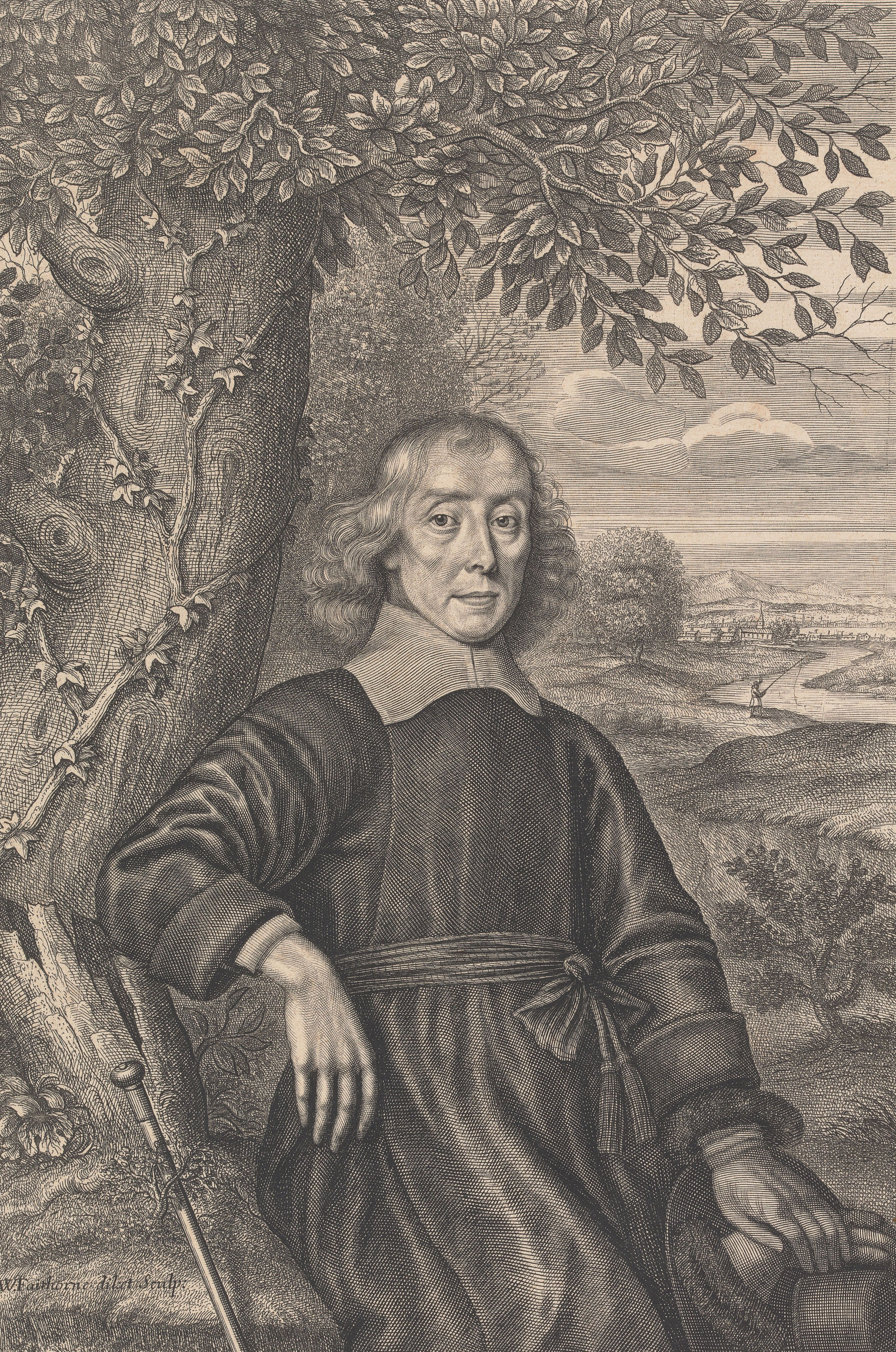
Henry More

The Cambridge Platonists like Benjamin Whichcote, Ralph Cudworth, and Henry More, were an influential group of Neoplatonists. They influenced the likes of Peter Sterry, Nathanael Culverwel, Joseph Glanvill, Richard Cumberland, Anne Conway, George Rust, John Smith, and John Norris.

Benjamin Whichcote (1609– 1683) disagreed with total depravity. He was also a Platonist who called reason "the very voice of God." Ralph Cudworth (1617– 1688) was a leading opponent of Hobbes, known for his The True Intellectual System of the Universe (1678). Cudworth challenged Hobbes' determinism, believing in free will and a hegemonikon or command center of the mind and soul connecting it to the body, a notion borrowed from the Stoics.

Henry More (1614–1687) was a critic of Cartesianism. More rejected Cartesian dualism, arguing that spirit, like matter, must be extended in space, coining the terms fourth dimension and essential spissitude. He opposed the Cartesian view that animals were mere machines, asserting instead they possess immaterial but mortal souls.

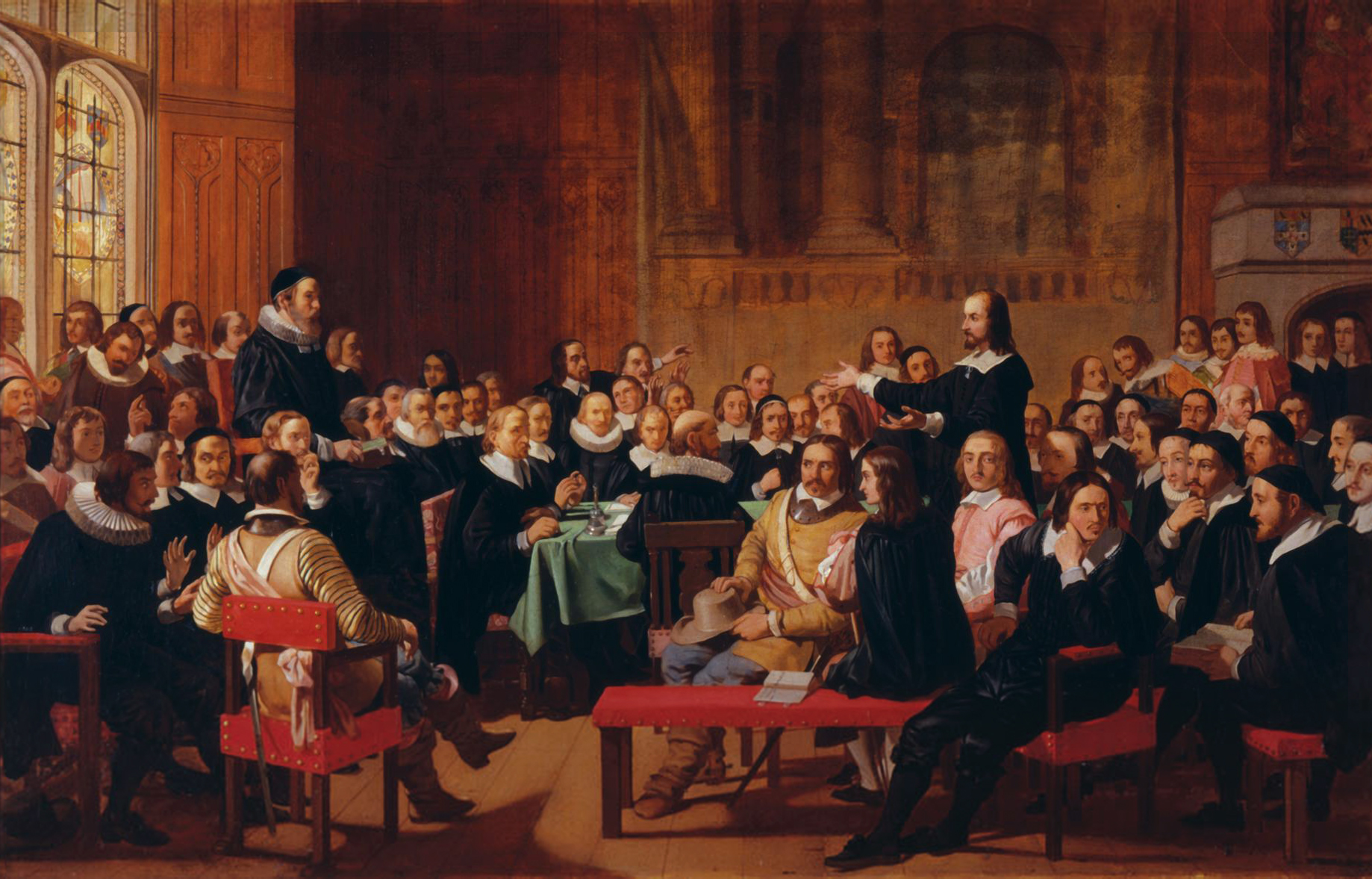
Assertion of Liberty of Conscience by the Independents of the Westminster Assembly of Divines by John Rogers Herbert

Puritan Peter Sterry (1613–1672) was a follower of Whichcote and the chaplain for Robert Greville. Sterry was then chaplain for Oliver Cromwell, and a member of the Westminster Assembly.

Nathanael Culverwell (1619–1651) was an opponent of "father of English Deism" Herbert of Cherbury (1583–1648), author of De Veritate (1624). Culverwell in response wrote An Elegant and Learned Discourse of the Light of Nature (1654).

Joseph Glanvill (1636–1680) "the most skillful apologist of the virtuosi", or leading propagandist for natural philosophers. (Note: In 1661, Glanvill predicted "To converse at the distance of the Indes by means of sympathetic conveyances may be as natural to future times as to us is a literary correspondence.") wrote the posthumously published book on witchcraft Saducismus Triumphatus (1681). Richard Cumberland (1631–1718) was a Latitudinarian critic of Hobbes considered the founder of utilitarianism.

Anne Conway (1631–1679) was a vitalist critic of Descartes who wrote The Principles of the Most Ancient and Modern Philosophy (c. 1677). Historian Hugh Trevor-Roper called her "England's greatest female philosopher." Another was John Norris's correspondent Mary Astell (1666–1731), "the first English feminist".

=== British Empiricism ===
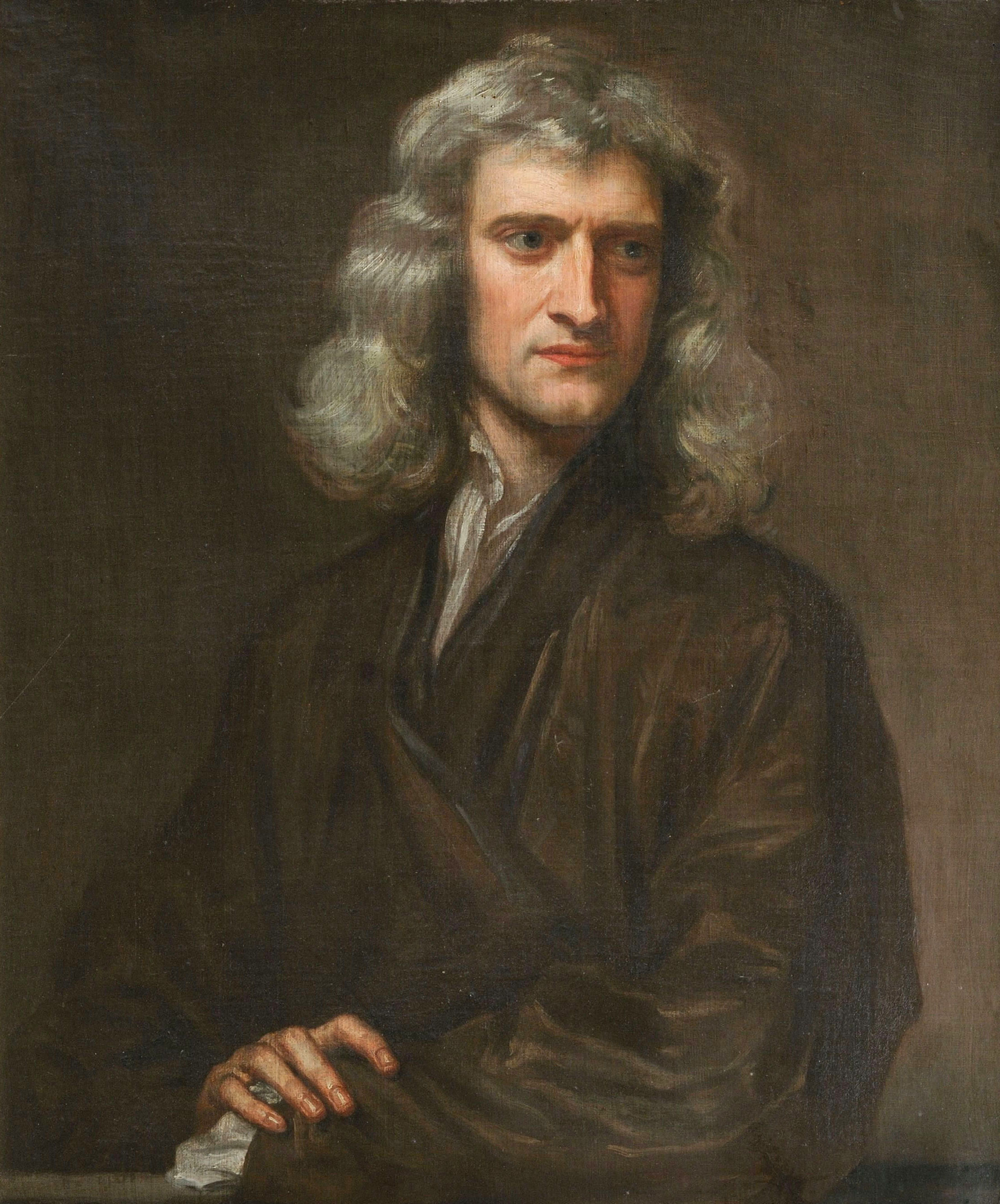
Isaac Newton

British empiricism refers to the philosophical tradition in the early modern era epitomized by the three philosophers John Locke, George Berkeley, (Note: Berkeley, despite being Irish, was referred to as British as County Kilkenny, where he lived in Ireland, was a part of the United Kingdom of Great Britain and Ireland at the time.) and David Hume.

A heavy influence on British empiricism and the Enlightenment was the philosophy of Newtonianism, the work of natural philosopher and Royal Society fellow Sir Isaac Newton (1643–1727). His Philosophiæ Naturalis Principia Mathematica (1686) included his laws of motion, introducing classical mechanics in physics.

Newton had obtained his degree at Cambridge just before the university temporarily closed as a precaution against the Great Plague. Soon after, he invented the infinitesimal calculus. In religion, Newton was a kind of Nontrinitarian Arian, who read John Biddle, "the father of English Unitarianism."

==== John Locke ====
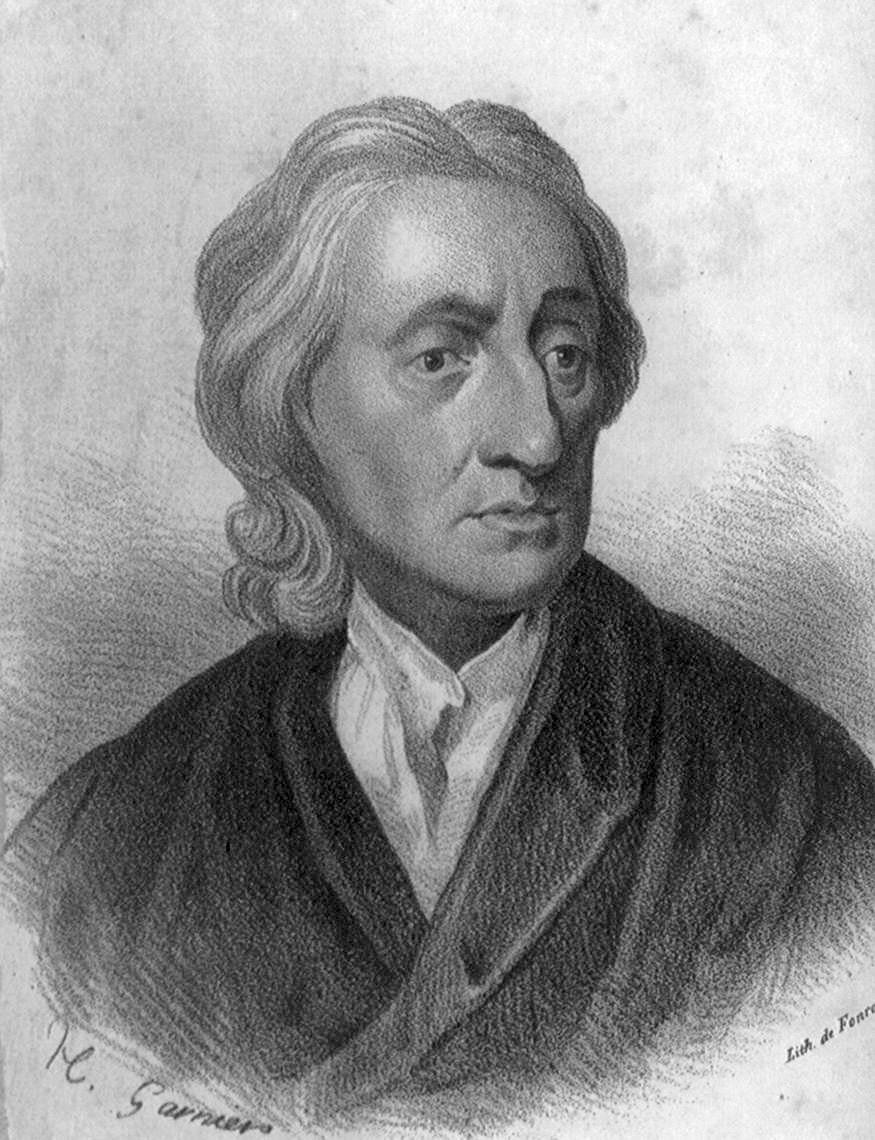
John Locke

John Locke (1632–1704) was a physician and empiricist who advocated religious tolerance and natural rights. Newton's influence on Locke was mediated by Dutch natural philosopher Christiaan Huygens, who assured Locke that Newton's mathematics was sound.

Locke held to representationalism in the philosophy of perception, believing all of the objects of the understanding are ideas, which exist in the mind. An Essay Concerning Human Understanding (1690) traces the origin of ideas. While there are innate capacities for Locke, there are no innate ideas “stamped upon the mind” from birth. This is known as the tabula rasa or blank slate.

Locke believed in primary and secondary qualities. Primary qualities are thought to be properties of objects that are independent of any observer, such as solidity, extension, motion, number and figure, while secondary qualities are thought to be properties that produce sensations in observers, such as color, taste, smell, and sound.

Locke further believed in the association of ideas. He thought there were simple ideas and complex ideas. Simple ideas are 'pure' and enter by the senses, while complex ideas are simple ideas combined together and related to form concepts using the abstracting activity of the mind.

Locke advanced an early theory of personal identity. He thought that our being the same person from one time to another consists, not in our having the same soul or the same body, but rather the same series of psychological connections, recognizing or remembering being the same thinking thing in different times and places.

===== Religion and Revolution =====
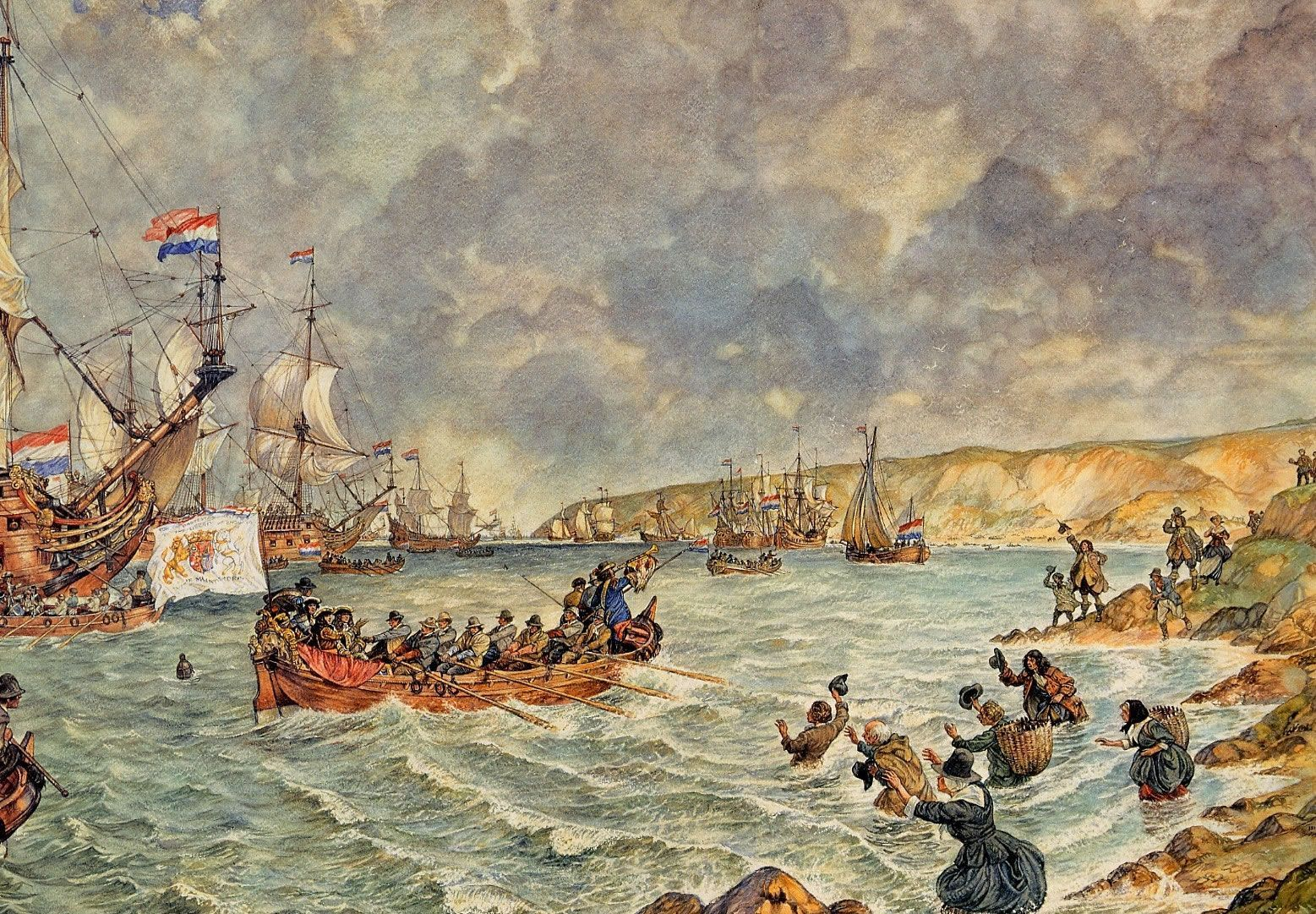
The Prince of Orange landing at Torbay, part of the Glorious Revolution, as depicted in an illustration by Johan Herman Isings.

Locke wrote Two Treatises of Government (1689) to justify the Glorious Revolution (1688). It states government required the consent of the governed, and that an unjust ruler could be overthrown. Locke influenced the American Revolution and the philosophes of the French Revolution. In America, Locke most notably influenced Thomas Jefferson. In France, Locke most notably influenced Voltaire and Étienne Bonnot de Condillac.

Locke's patron's grandson was moral philosopher Lord Shaftesbury (1671–1713) , who was also influenced by the Cambridge Platonists. Shaftesbury influenced Joseph Butler (1692–1752), who along with Richard Bentley (1662–1742) and William Warburton (1698–1779), were opponents of deism.

Samuel Clarke (1675–1729), the major figure in British philosophy between Locke and Berkeley, was an ethical rationalist who opposed deism. Samuel Clarke was taught by Newton's friend and Cartesian John Ellis (c. 1634–1716). Clarke was a Unitarian, some of whom still use his altered, Nontrinitarian revision of the Book of Common Prayer (1662).

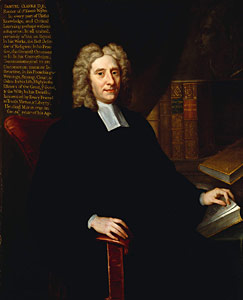
Samuel Clarke was an ethical rationalist.

Butler and Clarke influenced conservative and Counter-Enlightenment figure Edmund Burke (1729–1797), writer of A Philosophical Enquiry into the Origin of Our Ideas of the Sublime and Beautiful (1757) and Reflections on the Revolution in France (1790). Burke distinguishes the beautiful and the sublime, and opposed the French Revolution, claiming it was distinct from the Glorious Revolution (and the American Revolution) which was wrongly perceived as radical.

The deists included Irishman John Toland, Matthew Tindal, William Wollaston, Anthony Collins, and Henry St. John Viscount Bolingbroke. John Toland's (1670–1722) best known work, Christianity Not Mysterious (1696), opposed hierarchy in both church and state. In Ireland, copies were burned by the public hangman, and he was forced to flee the country never to return. Anthony Collins (1676–1729) dubbed himself a "freethinker" in A Discourse of Freethinking (1713). William Wollaston's (1659–1724) book on natural religion The Religion of Nature Delineated (1722) was influential in both Britain and New England. Matthew Tindal (1657–1733) wrote Christianity as old as the Creation (1730), influential in England and on the Continent. Henry St. John Viscount Bolingbroke (1678–1751) was criticized by Warburton, and quoted by French atheist Baron D'Holbach.

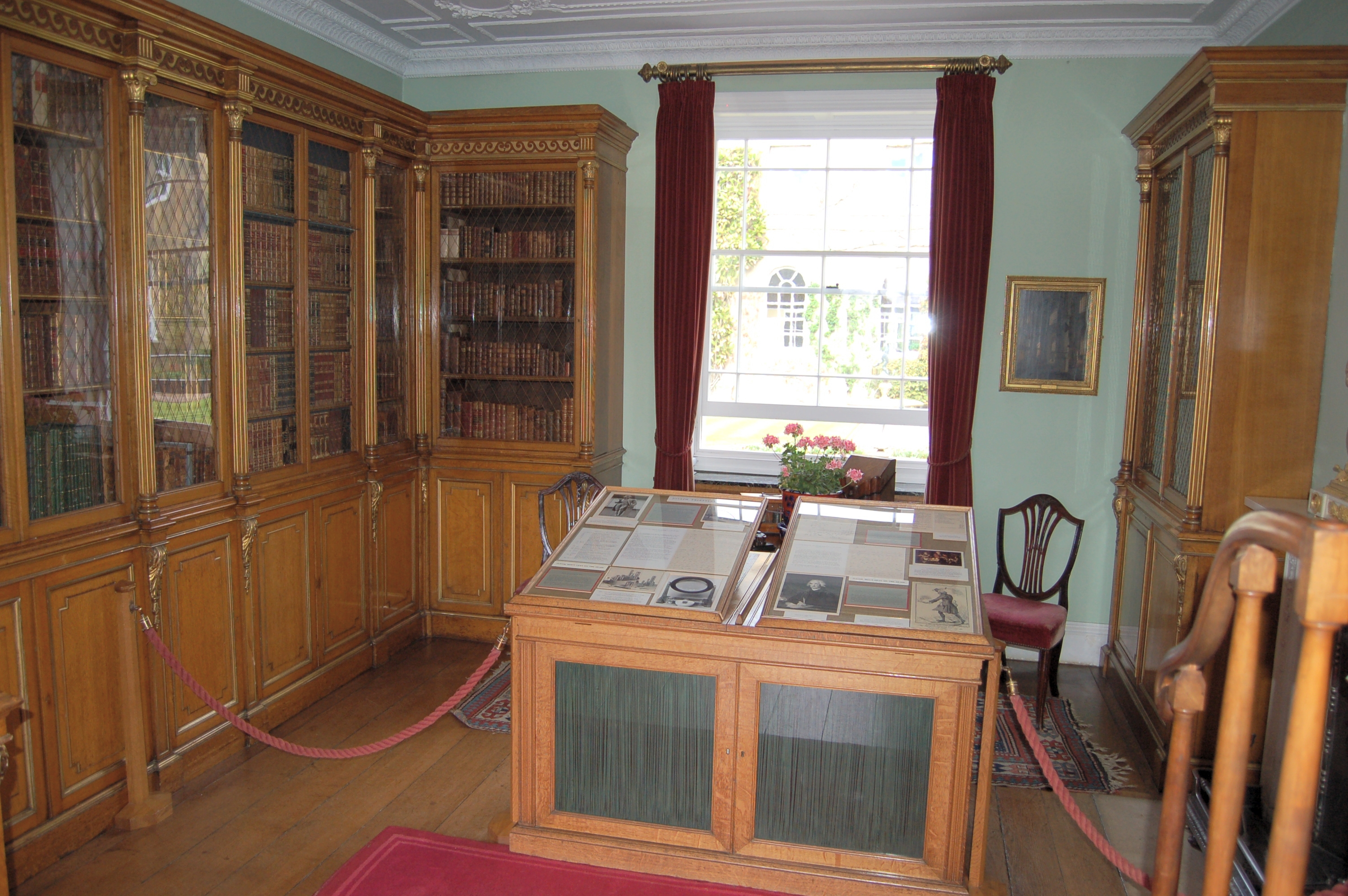
The laboratory at Lord Shelburne's estate, Bowood House in Wiltshire, where Priestley discovered oxygen.

David Hartley (1705–1757) and Joseph Priestley (1733–1804) were materialists. Hartley was an associationist and early psychologist who wrote Observations on Man (1749). He believed the faculties arise from the nervous system rather than an immaterial soul. Unitarian and natural philosopher Priestley, best known for discovering oxygen, also wrote The History and Present State of Electricity (1769) and Essay on the First Principles of Government (1768). He supported the American and French Revolutions, fleeing to America after a mob burned down his Birmingham home and church in 1791.

Hartley influenced Abraham Tucker (1705–1774), who wrote The Light of Nature Pursued (1777), and anarchist William Godwin (1756–1836). Godwin influenced utopian socialist Robert Owen (1771–1858).

Catharine Trotter Cockburn (1679–1749) defended Locke's philosophy. Locke's educational views influenced Godwin's wife Mary Wollstonecraft (1759–1797), known for A Vindication of the Rights of Woman (1792).

While Locke mostly ignored logic, Isaac Watts (1674–1748) was a Lockean logician who wrote The Improvement of the Mind (1741). Locke influenced parson-naturalists who advanced natural theology, like botanist John Ray (1627–1705), William Derham (1657–1735), and William Paley (1743–1805). Derham and Paley in Natural Theology (1802) propounded the argument from design with the watchmaker analogy.

==== George Berkeley ====
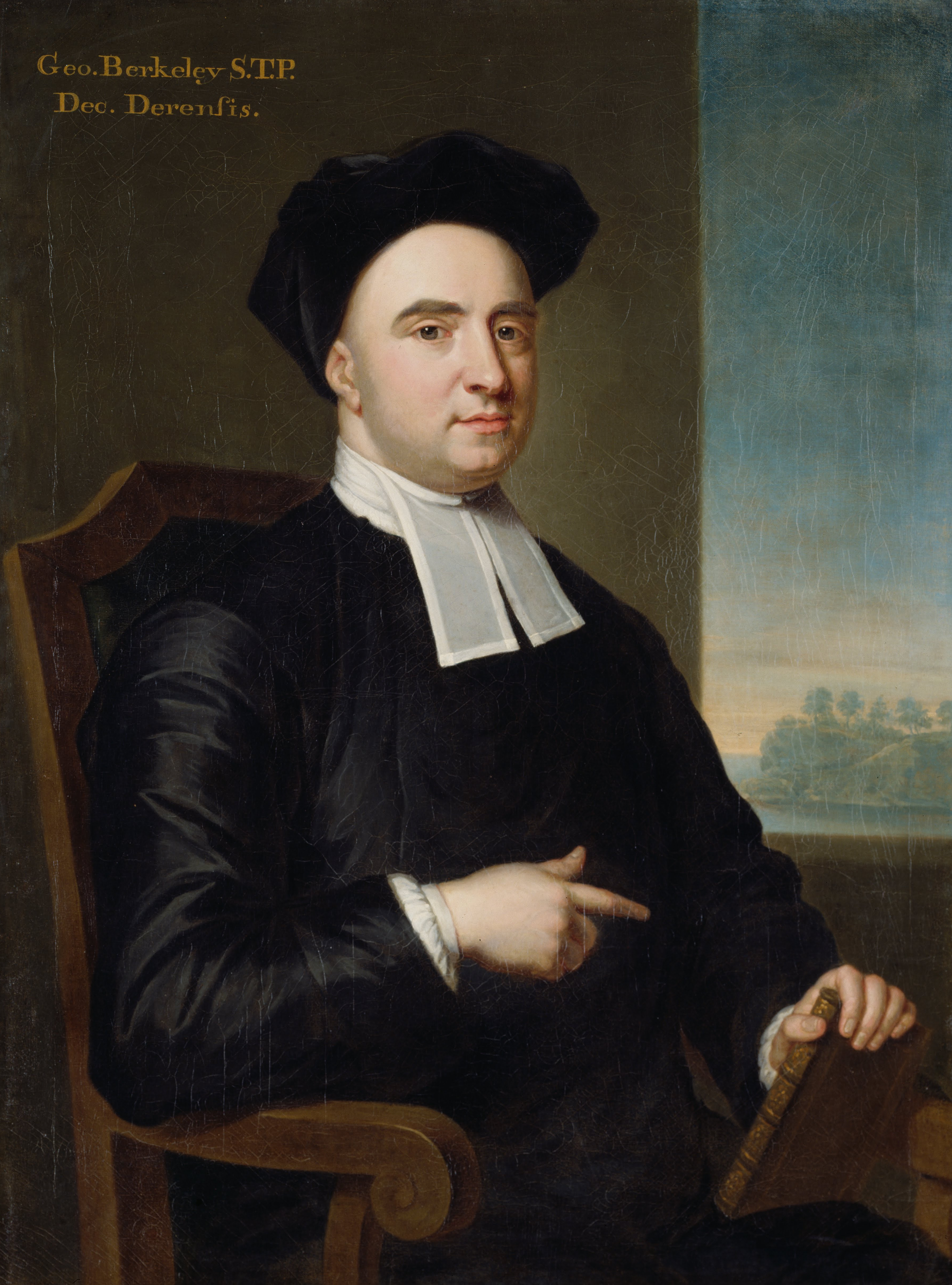
Bishop Berkeley

George Berkeley (1685–1753) was a British empiricist, and an Irishman who served as Bishop of Cloyne from 1734 until his death. Berkeley was also a subjective idealist, who rejected Locke's distinction between primary and secondary qualities in A Treatise Concerning the Principles of Human Knowledge (1710). Berkeley believed there is no such thing as matter or a mind-independent entity. This world was given regularity, where objects seem to exist even if one does not perceive them, by some other force, which Berkeley concluded was the mind of God.

Berkeley supported his views with the argument from illusion. The question If a tree falls in a forest and no one is around to hear it, does it make a sound? is taken to exemplify the thought of Berkeley. Berkeley is known for his motto "esse est percipi aut percipere", "to exist is to be perceived, or to perceive".

Berkeley traveled to Rhode Island and influenced the philosophy of the American colonies. Berkeley also criticized the infinitesmal calculus in The Analyst (1734). After Berkeley, metaphysics was temporarily abandoned in Britain, with the exception of James Burnett (1714–1799).

==== David Hume ====
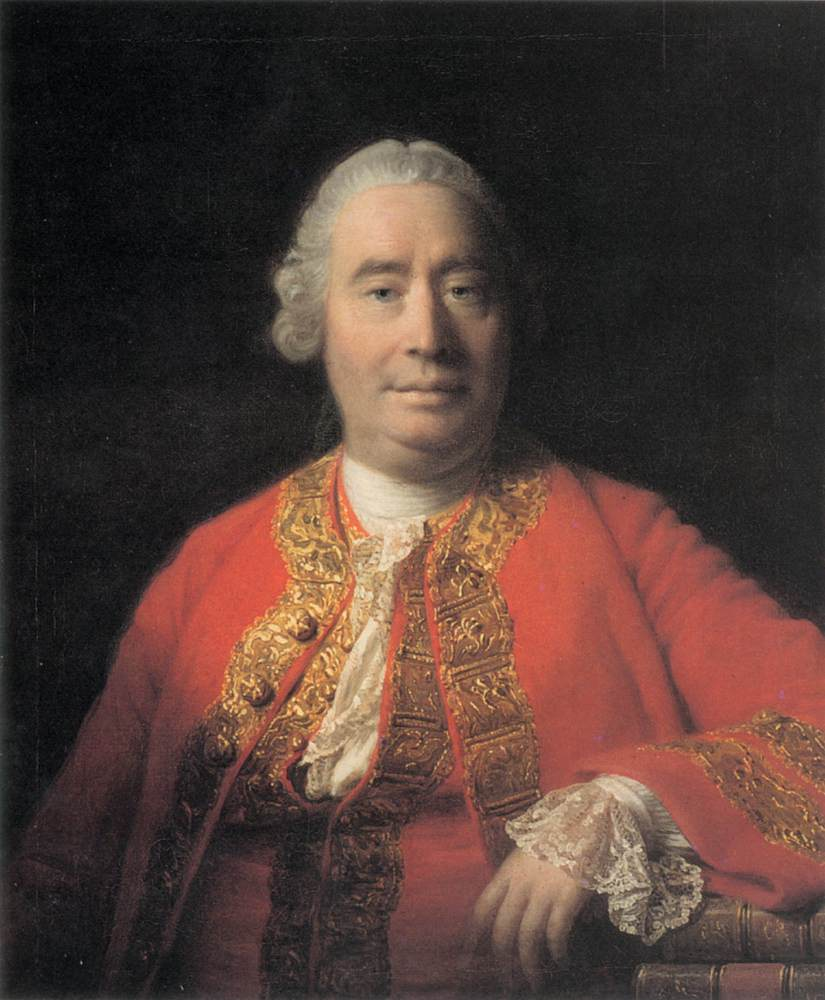
Skeptic David Hume

David Hume (1711–1776) was a Scottish skeptic philosopher, economist, and historian, and the founder of Humeanism. His major works, A Treatise of Human Nature (1739–1740), the An Enquiry concerning Human Understanding (1748), An Enquiry Concerning the Principles of Morals (1751), and Dialogues Concerning Natural Religion (1779) remain widely influential.

Hume famously described the problem of induction. He argues that inductive reasoning cannot be rationally employed, since, in order to justify induction, one would either have to provide a sound deductive argument or an inductively strong argument. But there is no sound deductive argument for induction, and to ask for an inductive argument to justify induction would be to beg the question.

Hume's problem of causation is related to his problem of induction. He held that there is no empirical access to the supposed necessary connection between cause and effect. In seeking to justify the belief that A causes B, one might assert, in the past, B has always closely followed A in both space and time. But the special necessary connection that is supposed to be causation is never observed in experience, which is only a constant conjunction of events, with no necessity whatsoever. Hume's attack on causality was credited with waking German Immanuel Kant from his "dogmatic slumber." (Note: Kant even claimed to be of Scottish heritage.)

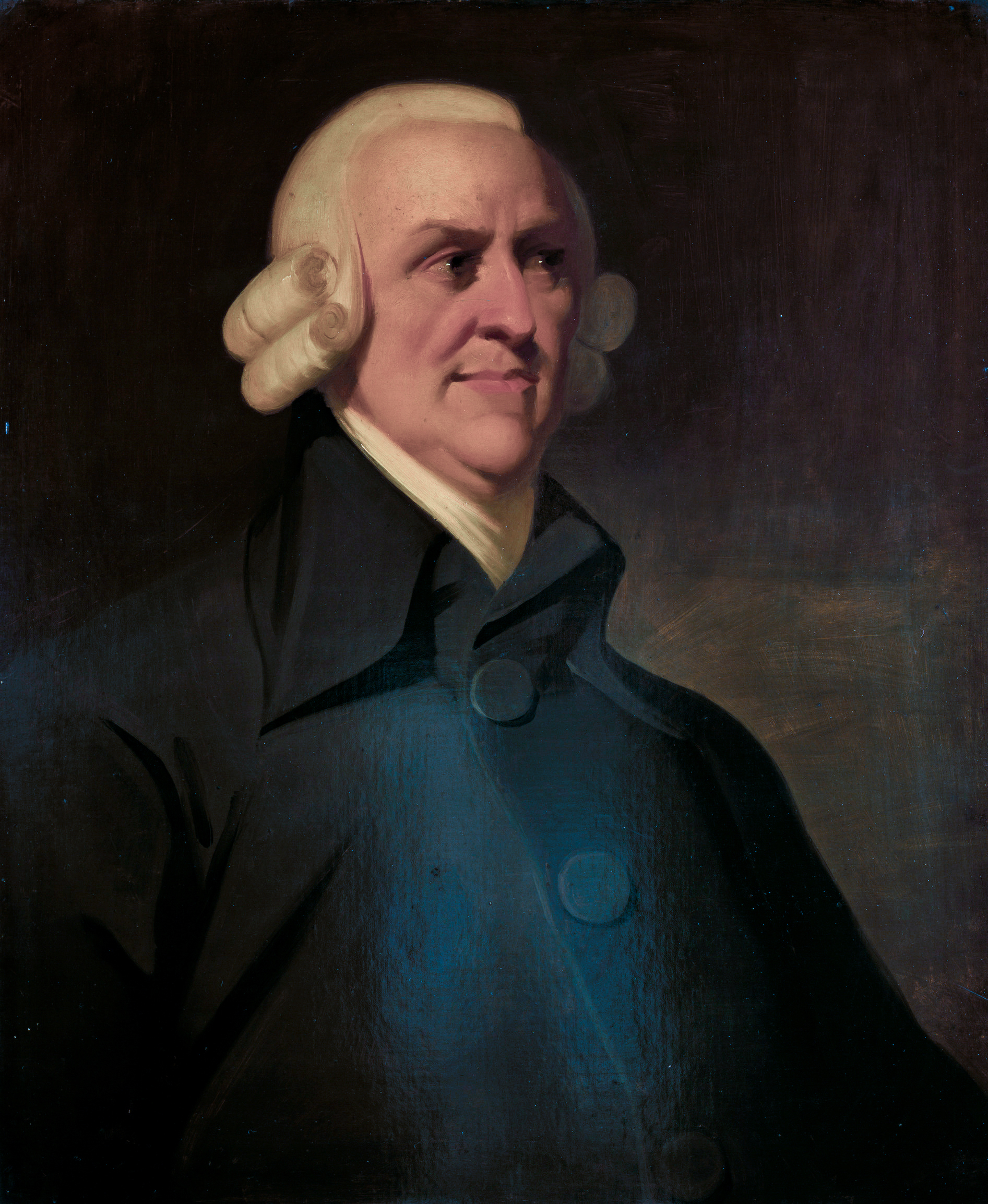
Moral philosopher and economist Adam Smith

In personal identity, Hume was a bundle theorist, believing there is no robust self to which properties adhere, but only a bundle of perceptions. Hume also showed how one cannot deduce an 'ought' from an 'is'.

=== Scottish Enlightenment ===
The Scottish Enlightenment saw a series of influential Scottish philosophers, read widely in both Britain and America. Edinburgh had The Select Society and The Poker Club. Scotland's ancient universities were St Andrews, Glasgow, Edinburgh, King's College, and Marischal College.

==== Adam Smith ====
Adam Smith (1723–1790) was a Scottish moral philosopher and a pioneer of political economics, writing The Theory of Moral Sentiments (1759) and The Wealth of Nations (1776). Smith's moral theory emphasized sympathy. The Wealth of Nations is considered his magnum opus and the first modern work of economics. It advocates laissez-faire capitalism and uses the metaphor of the invisible hand.

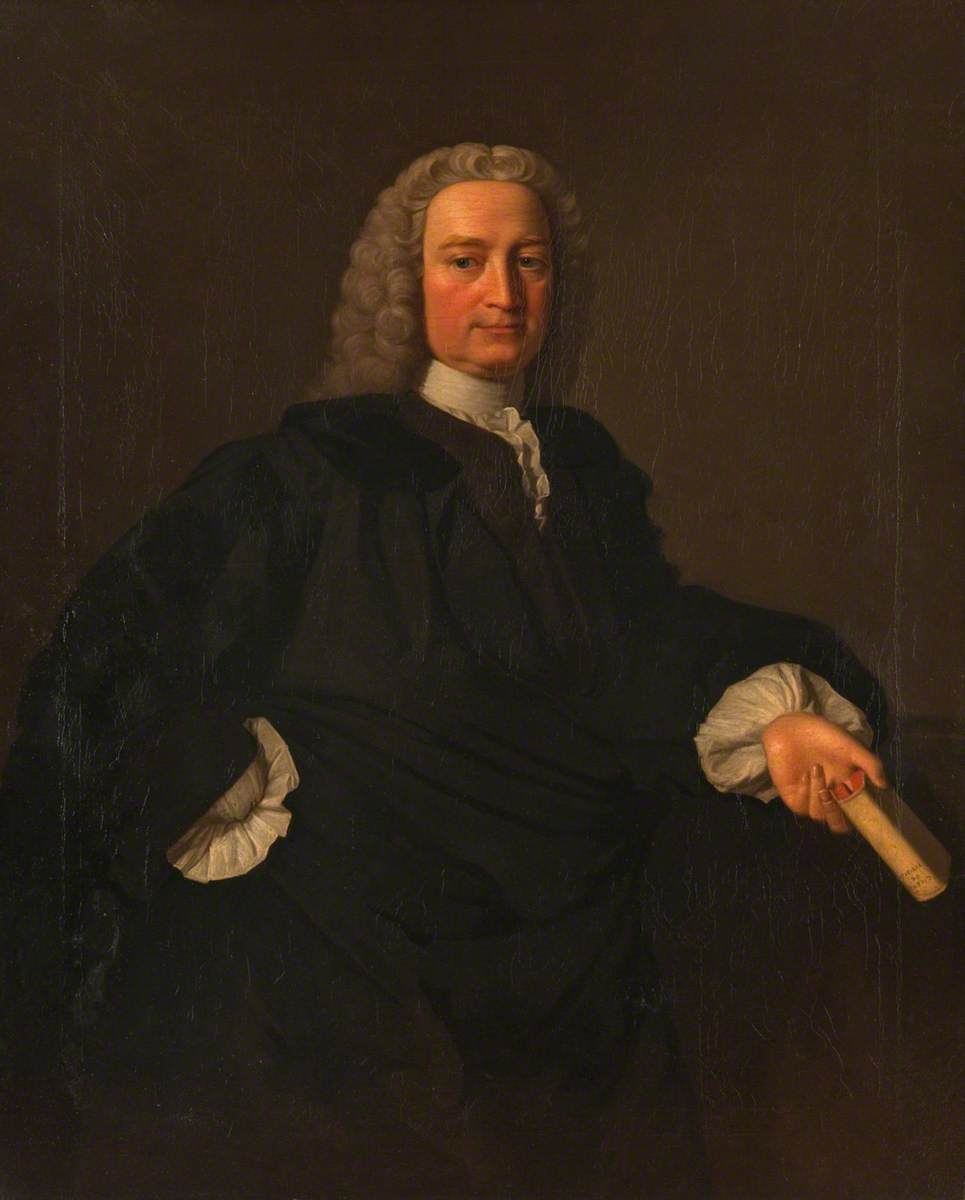
Francis Hutcheson

Smith studied moral philosophy at Glasgow and Oxford. After graduating, he delivered a series of successful public lectures at Edinburgh, leading him to collaborate with David Hume. Smith obtained a professorship at Glasgow teaching moral philosophy, and during this time wrote and published The Theory of Moral Sentiments.

==== Francis Hutcheson ====
Francis Hutcheson's (1694–1746) moral philosophy emerged as a reaction to Hobbes' egoism, and Samuel Clarke and William Wollaston's rationalism. In A System of Moral Philosophy, in Three Books (1755) Hutcheson advocated utilitarianism, and inner senses of morality and aesthetics akin to physical external senses like sight and hearing.

Hutcheson was also an early advocate of animal rights, and an influence on Gulliver's Travels (1726) author Jonathan Swift.

==== Thomas Reid ====
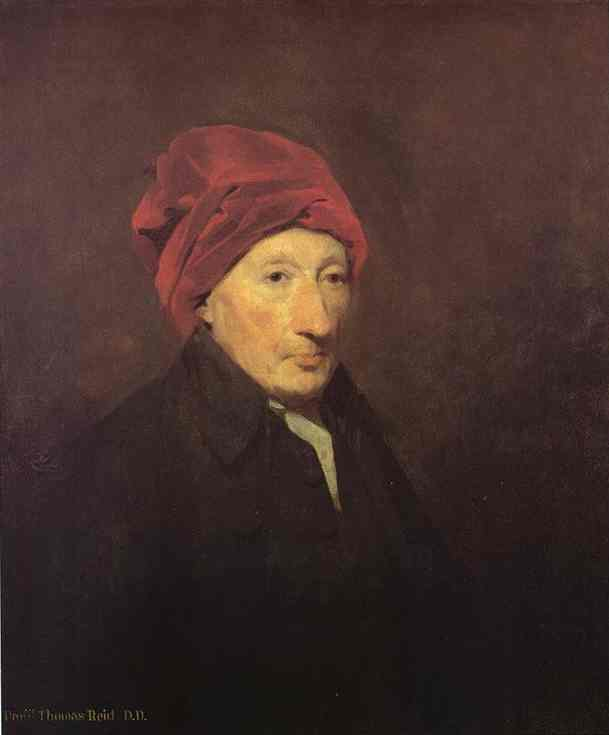
Thomas Reid

Thomas Reid (1710–1796) was the most famous critic of David Hume. Reid advocated common sense and direct realism in works like An Inquiry Into the Human Mind on the Principles of Common Sense (1764) and two Essays: Essays on the Intellectual Powers of Man (1785) and Essays on the Active Powers of the Human Mind (1788). This school of thought influenced thinkers such as Dugald Stewart, Thomas Brown, Sir William Hamilton, and H. L. Mansel.

According to Reid, Hume's skepticism and Berkeley's idealism were intolerable consequences of Descartes and Locke's dogma of representationalism, which he called the "Way of Ideas." Reid states in any moment of veridical perception there is an object, a subject, and the act of perception. Reid doubts there is some further, fourth thing, the idea of the object in the subject's mind.

=== Midlands Enlightenment ===
Erasmus Darwin (1731–1802) was a key figure of the Midlands Enlightenment, which influenced both natural philosophy and British romanticism. Erasmus Darwin was a founding member of the Lunar Society of Birmingham, which held meetings at his house. Other members of the Lunar Society of Birmingham included Joseph Priestley, potter and business magnate Josiah Wedgwood, silversmith Matthew Boulton and his business partner James Watt, clockmaker John Whitehurst, chemist James Keir and The History of Sandford and Merton author Thomas Day. Lexicographer Samuel Johnson is also considered part of the Midlands Enlightenment. (Note: In the Life of Samuel Johnson, author James Boswell relates that Johnson heard fellows talking about Berkeley's philosophy. He kicked a stone and said "I refute it thus.")

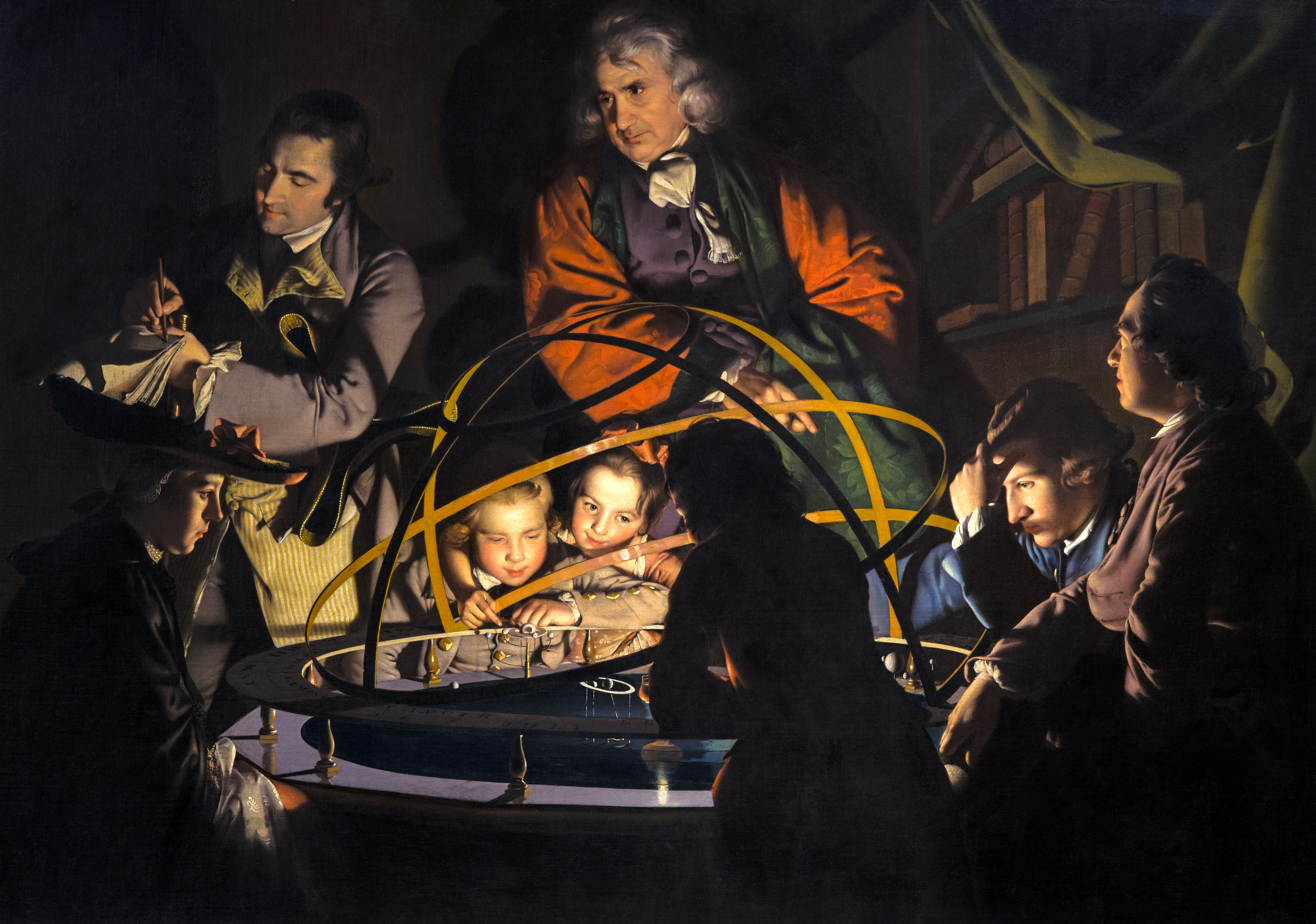
A Philosopher Giving that Lecture on the Orrery, in which a Lamp is put in place of the Sun, by Joseph Wright of Derby

Erasmus Darwin also founded the Derby Philosophical Society. The Darwin and Wedgwood families intermarried. Josiah Wedgwood (1730–1795) proposed the obsolete Wedgwood scale. James Watt's (1736–1819) steam engine was fundamental to the changes brought by the Industrial Revolution.

== 19th century ==
The 19th century is notable as seeing the end of the Georgian era (1714–1830) and nearly all of the Victorian era (1837–1901).

=== Utilitarianism ===
Utilitarianism is a consequentialist theory of normative ethics which holds that an act is morally right if and only if that act maximizes happiness or pleasure, or some other sense of utility or well-being. The British utilitarians were highly influenced by British empiricism.

==== Jeremy Bentham ====
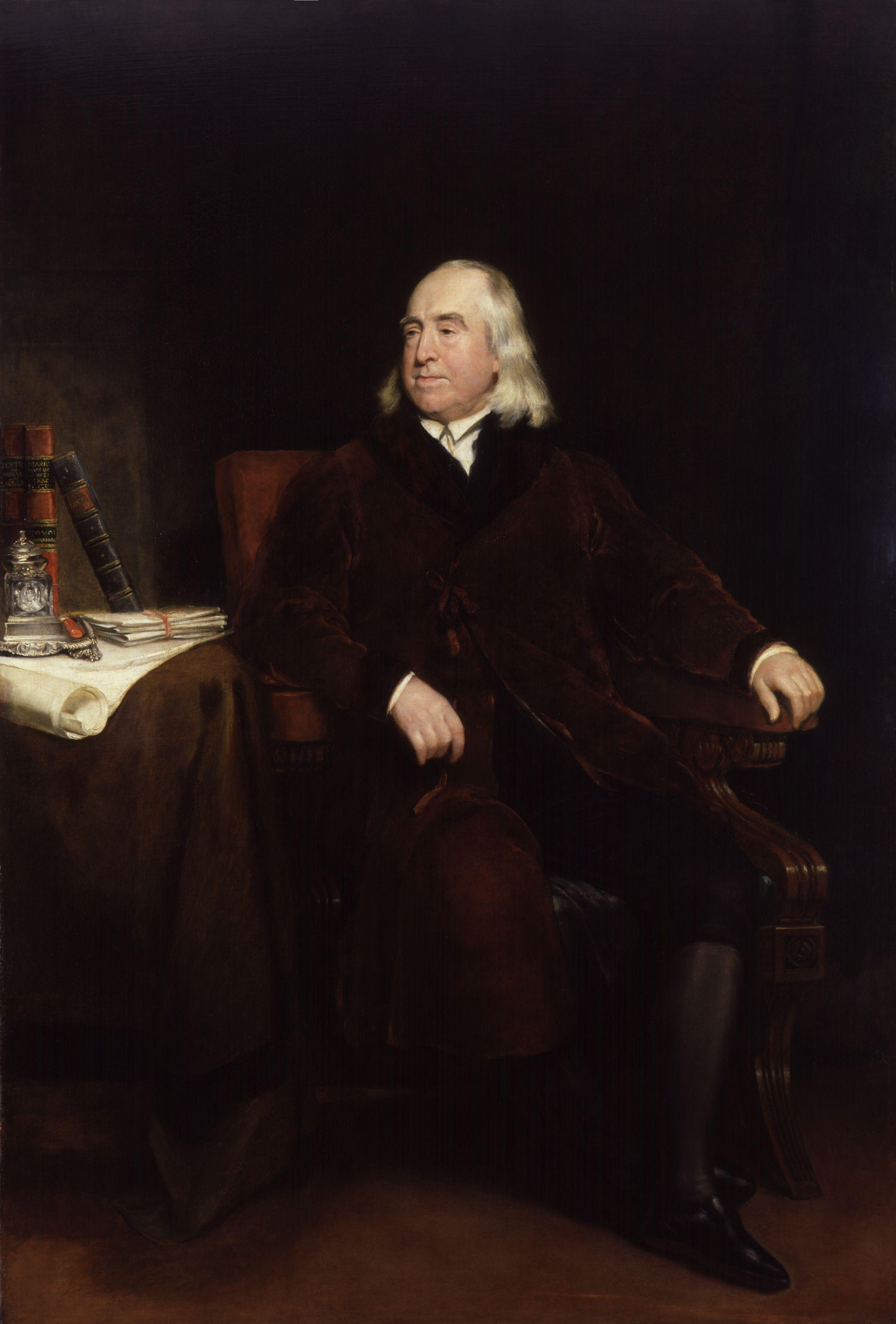
Jeremy Bentham

Jeremy Bentham (1748–1832) is well known for beginning the tradition of classical utilitarianism in Britain. Bentham was influenced by Priestley, and derided natural law and natural rights as "nonsense upon stilts".

Bentham's views are said to be hedonistic, regarding pleasure as the only intrinsic good and pain as the only intrinsic evil. Utilitarianism was described by Bentham as "the greatest happiness or greatest felicity principle". Bentham held the felicific calculus should be used to determine the rightness and wrongness of acts, by measuring the amount of pleasure and pain, which he thought could be broken down into distinct units called hedons and dolors.

His students were James Mill, John Austin, and American John Neal. On his death, Bentham left instructions for his body to be dissected and then permanently preserved as an "auto-icon" (or self-image), which would be his memorial. This was done, and the auto-icon is now on public display in the entrance of the Student Centre at University College London (UCL).

==== John Stuart Mill ====
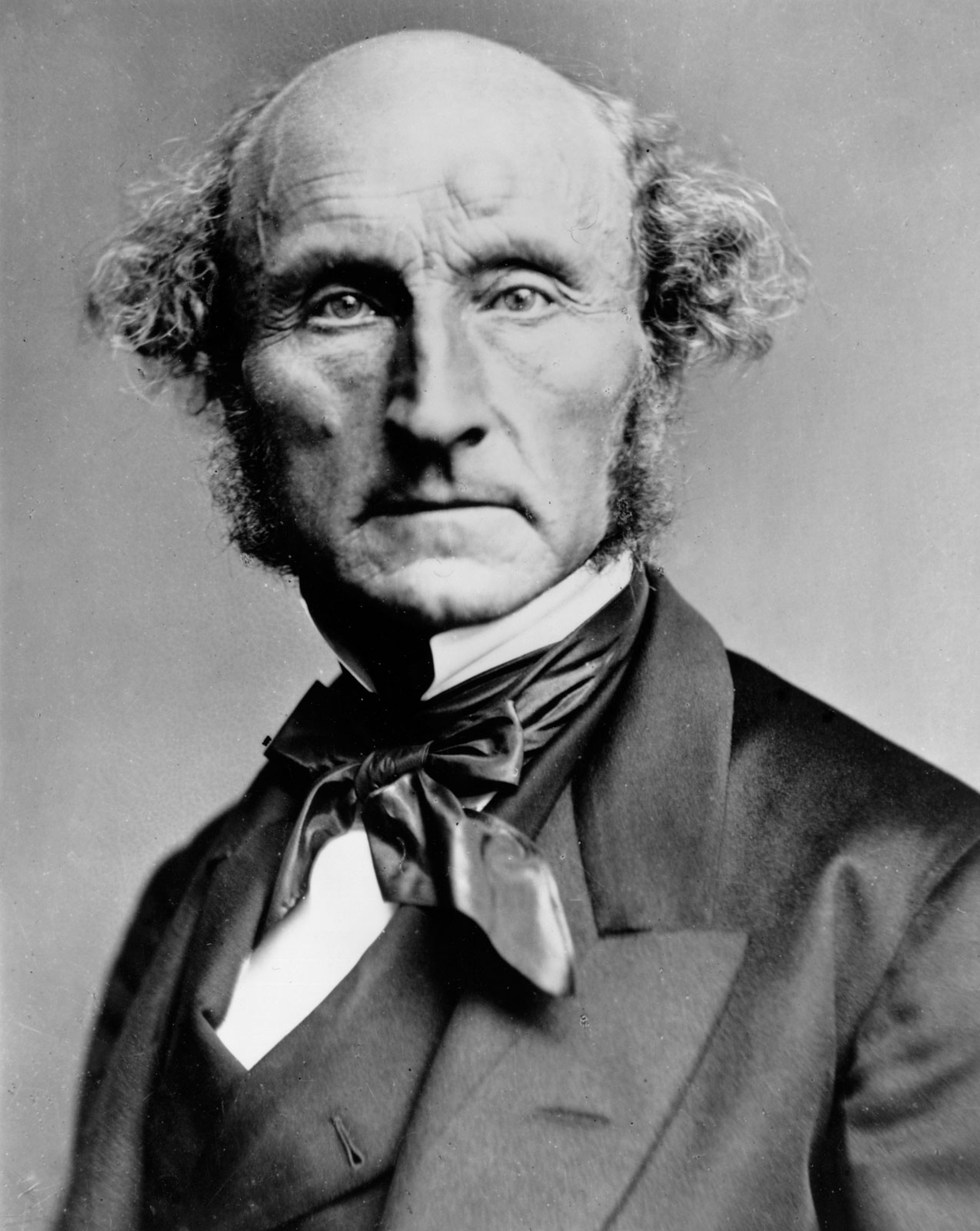
John Stuart Mill

John Stuart Mill (1806–1873) the son of James, was influential in philosophy and politics. Mill continued Bentham's tradition of utilitarianism in works like On Liberty (1859) and Utilitarianism (1863). Mill's conception of liberty justified the freedom of the individual in opposition to unlimited state control. Mill was influenced by French philosopher Auguste Comte, and so rejected Bentham's egoism. Mill also authored the inductive method of A System of Logic (1843).

Mill's wife was Harriet Taylor Mill (1807–1858). The most notable of Mill's many followers were Scotsman Alexander Bain and Henry Sidgwick.

==== Alexander Bain ====
Alexander Bain (1818–1903) advocated Mill's associationist theory of mind in works such as The Senses and the Intellect (1855) and The Emotions and the Will (1859). Bain started the journal Mind.

==== Henry Sidgwick ====
Henry Sidgwick (1838–1900) was one of the founders and first president of the Society for Psychical Research, a member of the Metaphysical Society, and promoted the higher education of women. Sidgwick published The Methods of Ethics (1874), which the Stanford Encyclopedia of Philosophy indicates "in many ways marked the culmination of the classical utilitarian tradition". Australian philosopher Peter Singer has said the Methods of Ethics "is simply the best book on ethics ever written."

=== Evolution ===
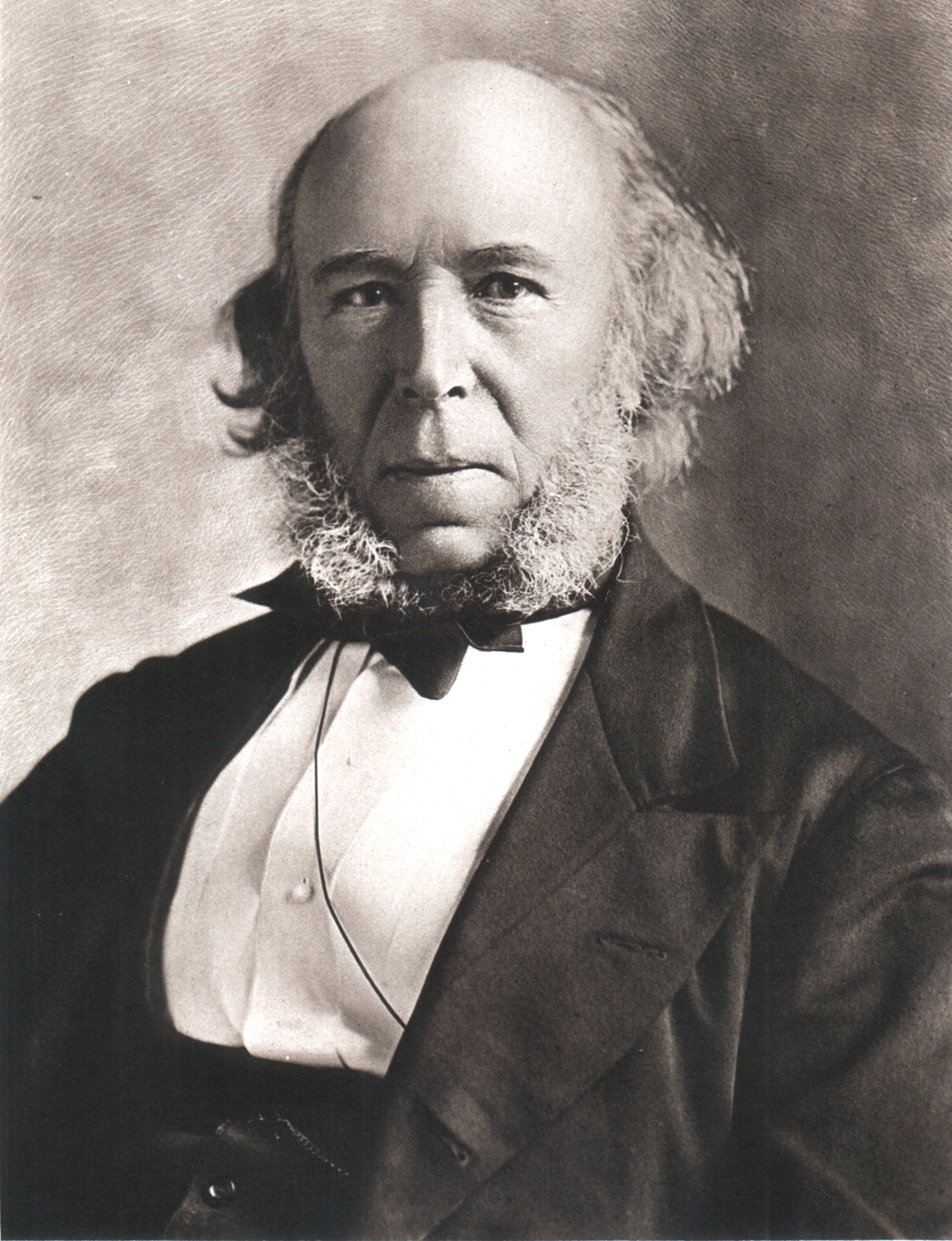
Herbert Spencer advocated Darwinism

Erasmus Darwin and Josiah Wedgwood's grandson Charles Darwin published the theory of evolution in On the Origin of Species (1859). Polymath William Whewell (1794–1866), who coined the term 'scientist', opposed evolution, but persuaded Charles Darwin to become secretary of the Geological Society of London. Charles Darwin was influenced by Scottish geologist Charles Lyell and English economist Thomas Robert Malthus.

Evolution influenced many philosophers, such as Herbert Spencer, Alfred Russel Wallace, George Romanes, Metaphysical Society members T. H. Huxley, Leslie Stephen, and W. K. Clifford, as well as George Henry Lewes and Karl Pearson.

Herbert Spencer (1820–1903) coined the term "survival of the fittest", and advocated social darwinism and classical liberalism. Spencer's father had been secretary of the Derby Philosophical Society. T. H. Huxley (1825–1895) became known as "Darwin's bulldog" and wrote Evolution and Ethics (1893), which states the task of morality is to counter the cruel natural order. He also coined the term agnosticism.

Leslie Stephen (1832–1904) joined the ethical movement. W. K. Clifford (1845–1879) was a kind of panpsychist who coined the term "mind-stuff". Arthur Eddington wrote in his book The Nature of the Physical World (1928) "The stuff of the world is mind-stuff."

George Henry Lewes (1817–1878) lived with George Eliot. Karl Pearson (1857–1936) was a eugenicist and a biographer of Darwin's cousin Sir Francis Galton.

=== Electromagnetism ===
Isaac Watts influenced physicist Michael Faraday (1791–1867), popularizer of the Royal Institution's Christmas Lecture Series. Paley's natural theology influenced Lord Kelvin (1824–1907). Inspired by Kelvin, James Clerk Maxwell (1831–1879) made Faraday's notion of lines of force into mathematics. Maxwell's equations for electromagnetism achieved the second great unification in physics, after Newton's.

=== British logic ===
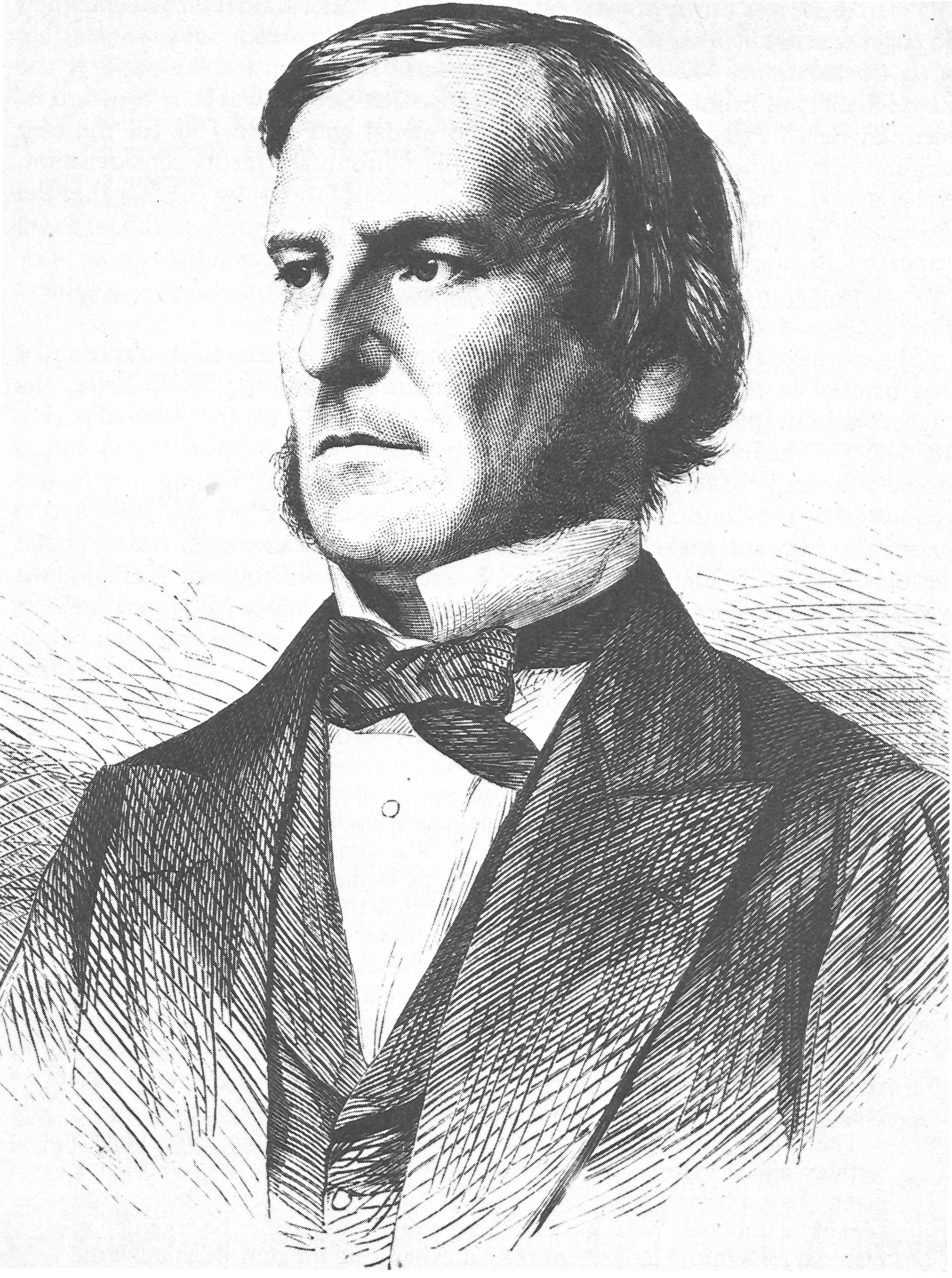
George Boole

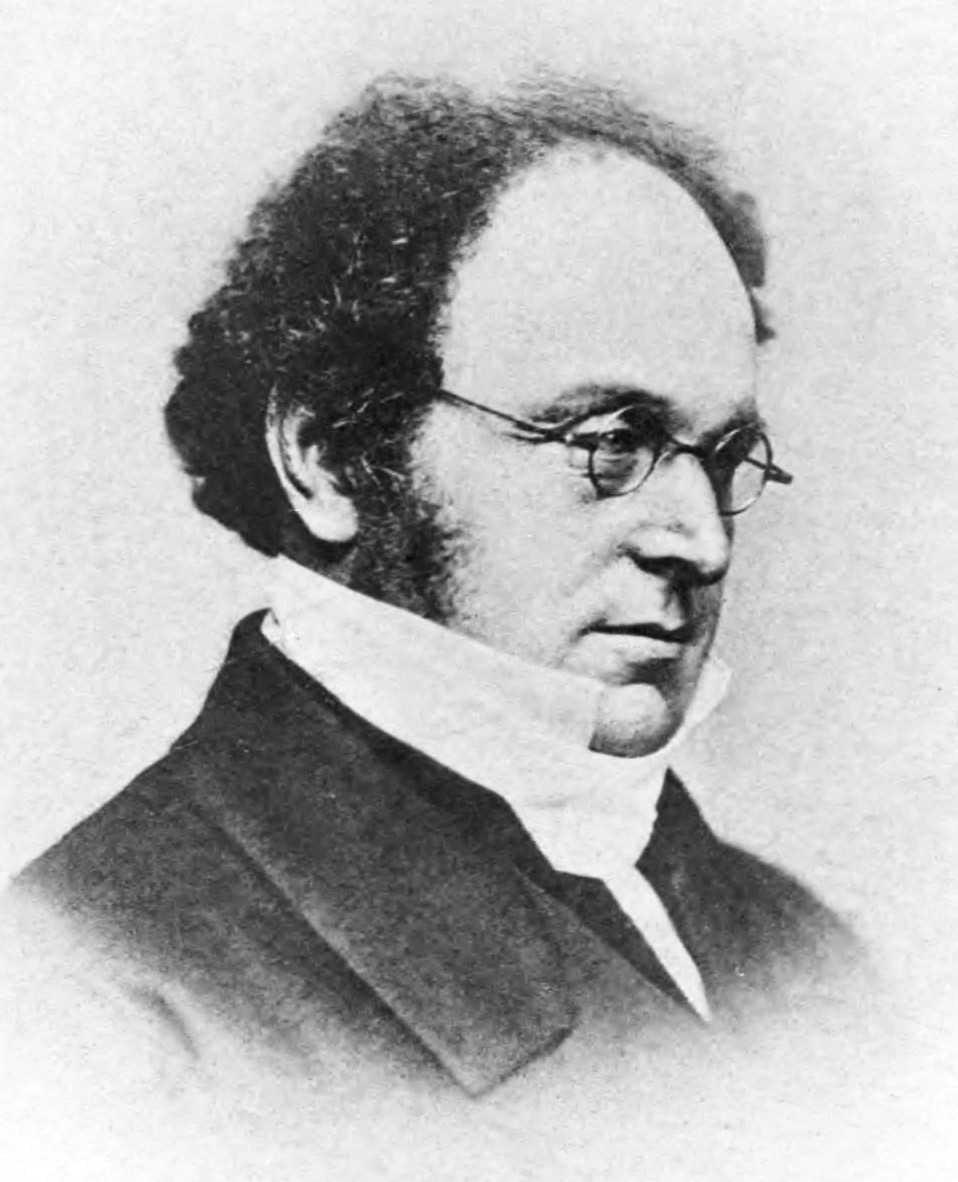
Augustus De Morgan

British philosophy in the nineteenth century saw a revival of logic, in reaction to the anti-logical aspects of British empiricism. This was started by Richard Whately (1787–1863), who wrote Elements of Logic (1826).

The major figure of this period is mathematician George Boole. Other figures include Sir William Hamilton, mathematician and laws namesake Augustus De Morgan, economist William Stanley Jevons, diagram namesake John Venn, Alice's Adventures in Wonderland author Lewis Carroll, Scottish mathematician Hugh MacColl, and American pragmatist Charles Sanders Peirce.

Richard Whately's work led to controversy. On the one hand, argued by William Whewell, logic could not arrive at "new truths" and was therefore inferior to and distinct from scientific reasoning; on the other hand, argued by Sir William Hamilton, Whately's effort to equate logic to a "grammar for reasoning" was wrong and reductive. Augustus De Morgan (1806–1871) saw the utility of Whately's logic, and demanded inclusion of logic in the Cambridge curriculum.

George Boole (1815–1864) is best known as the author of The Laws of Thought (1854), which contains Boolean algebra. Boolean logic, essential to computer programming, is credited with helping to lay the foundations for the Information Age. William Stanley Jevons (1835–1882) built a logical machine known as the logic piano. Lewis Carroll (1832–1898) has a famous paper on logic and infinite regress called "What the Tortoise Said to Achilles" (1895).

=== British idealism ===
Romanticist Samuel Taylor Coleridge (1772–1834) introduced Kant's philosophy and German idealism to Britain in his Biographia Literaria (1817). Another ambassador was Scotsman Thomas Carlyle (1795–1881), whose Critical and Miscellaneous Essays (1839) introduced many English speakers to German philosophy, and also parodied German idealism in Sartor Resartus (1834). Whately assistant John Henry Newman (1801–1890) and Unitarian James Martineau (1805–1900) put forward idealist views, as did Sir William Hamilton, who studied German philosophy at Heidelberg with his friend J. F. Ferrier (1808–1864); and there was also John Grote (1813–1866), brother of utilitarian George Grote (1794–1871).

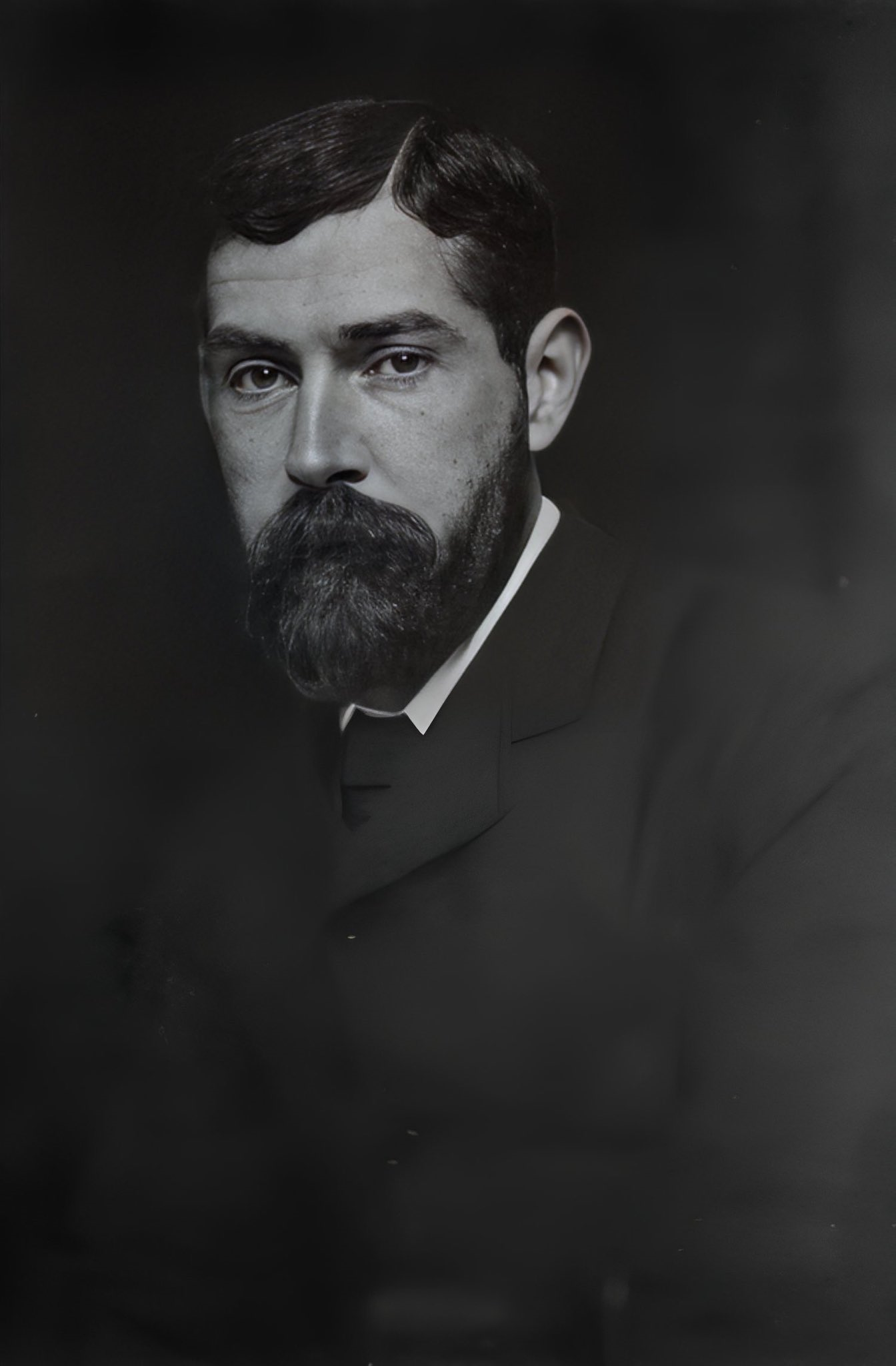
F. H. Bradley was a British idealist.

British philosophy was influenced by Hegel's absolute idealism from the mid-nineteenth century to the early twentieth century, called British idealism. Scotsman James Hutchison Stirling's (1820–1909) study of Hegel influenced the movement. Important representatives included Balliol College, Oxford Master Benjamin Jowett's (1817–1893) students T. H. Green, F. H. Bradley, John McTaggart, Bernard Bosanquet, H. H. Joachim, J. H. Muirhead, and G. R. G. Mure.

T. H. Green (1836–1882) was an influential social liberal. F. H. Bradley (1846–1924) authored the school's most notable work Appearance and Reality (1893). John McTaggart (1866–1925) wrote The Unreality of Time (1908), seminal in philosophy of time. (Note: Julian Barbour wrote The End of Time (1999).) McTaggart distinguishes between the dynamic or tensed A-theory of time (past, present, future), in which time flows; and the static or tenseless B-theory of time (earlier than, simultaneous with, later than). Aesthete Walter Pater (1839–1894) was influenced by British idealism, as was Oscar Wilde (1854–1900).

Two Cambridge Apostles, G. E. Moore and Bertrand Russell, were brought up in this tradition and then reacted against it, pioneering analytic philosophy and leading the "revolt against idealism." According to Russell, by the end of the nineteenth century, "the leading academic philosophers, both in America and Britain, were largely Hegelian". There was also Canadian idealism.

== 20th century and beyond ==
The 20th century saw the Edwardian era (1901–1910), World War I (1914–1918), World War II (1939–1945), and decline of the British Empire (1497–1997). The Philosophical Society of England was founded in 1913, and publishes The Philosopher.

=== Early 20th century philosophy ===
Analytic philosophy has dominated the English-speaking world since the early 20th century. It sought to accommodate new developments in philosophy of language (known as the linguistic turn) and logic and mathematics. British logic was imported to Germany by Ernst Schröder and influenced professor Gottlob Frege, who made the most substantial advances in logic since Aristotle. Frege was also a platonist who argued against psychologism.

==== G. E. Moore ====
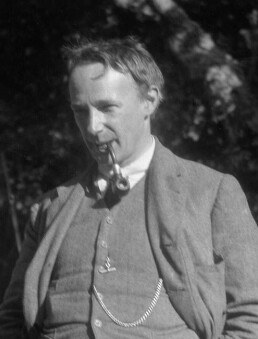
G. E. Moore led the revolt against idealism.

George Edward Moore (1873–1958) "led the way" in the 'revolt against idealism'. Moore is best known today for his defence of ethical non-naturalism, common sense, and the paradox that bears his name. He was president of the Aristotelian Society from 1918 to 1919.

Moore was influential among other academic philosophers, and also for the Bloomsbury Group, which included John Maynard Keynes (1883–1946). Moore is known for his clear style and methodical approach; and was critical of philosophy for its lack of progress, in stark contrast to advances in natural science since the Renaissance.

Moore advances ethical non-naturalism, the idea that "good" is sui generis and irreducible. He does this in Principia Ethica (1903), a work notable for the open question argument and identifying the naturalistic fallacy. Moore propounds anti-idealism and common sense in his essays, "The Refutation of Idealism" (1903), "A Defence of Common Sense" (1925), and "A Proof of the External World" (1939). Moore is notable for his here is one hand argument, influencing the last work of Ludwig Wittgenstein, On Certainty (1969).

==== Bertrand Russell ====
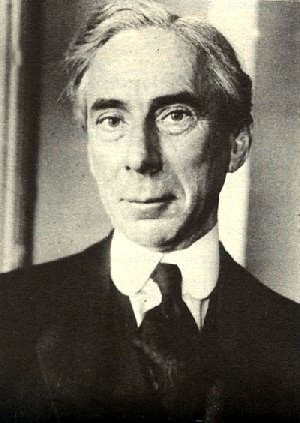
Bertrand Russell joined the revolt against idealism.

Bertrand Russell (1872–1970) joined Moore in the 'revolt against idealism.' Russell influenced logic, mathematics, set theory, linguistics, and philosophy.

Russell is widely held to be one of the 20th century's premier logicians. He was a logical atomist also influenced by Frege, and was the mentor of Ludwig Wittgenstein. He co-authored, with Alfred North Whitehead, Principia Mathematica, an attempt to derive all mathematical truths from a set of axioms using rules of inference in symbolic logic, the classic statement of the logicist project which started with Frege. Russell used a theory of types to overcome the paradox bearing his name.

Russell's theory of descriptions was influential in the philosophy of language and the analysis of definite descriptions. His theory was first developed in his paper "On Denoting" (1905), considered a "paradigm of philosophy." Russell distinguished between knowledge by description and knowledge by acquaintance. In philosophy of mind, Russell advanced neutral monism. Russell and Moore contributed to the philosophy of perception a naïve realism and sense-data theory.

As well as an academic philosopher, Russell was a prominent advocate of social reform and an anti-war activist who championed free trade and anti-imperialism. Russell was sent to Brixton Prison for his pacifist activism during World War I. While in prison, he wrote Introduction to Mathematical Philosophy (1919). Russell controversially advocated free love in Marriage and Morals (1929).

Russell was awarded the 1950 Nobel Prize in Literature, "in recognition of his varied and significant writings in which he champions humanitarian ideals and freedom of thought." In 1958, Russell was president of the Campaign for Nuclear Disarmament; their symbol is now widely known as the peace sign (semaphore for letters "N" and "D"). Russell also formed a private tribunal in 1966 opposing America's involvement in the Vietnam War.

==== Process philosophy ====
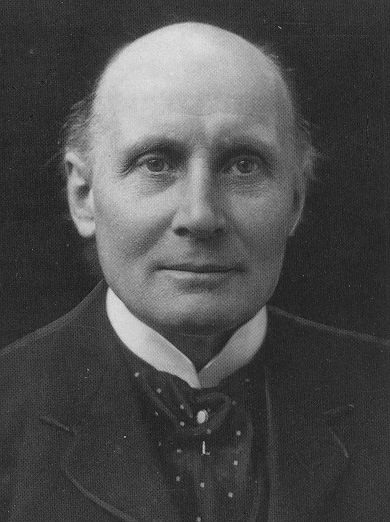
Alfred North Whitehead was a process philosopher.

Alfred North Whitehead (1861–1947) was an advocate of process philosophy or the "philosophy of organism" in works like Process and Reality (1929), which sees the world as made up of events or processes, rather than substances or things. Whitehead asserted in his book The Concept of Nature (1920) that objects, what he referred to as "concresences", are a conjunction of events that maintain a permanence of character.

==== British pragmatism ====
F. C. S. Schiller (1864–1937) was a critic of both idealism and analytic philosophy, and influenced by American pragmatist William James, calling his views "humanism". Schiller's first book was Riddles of the Sphinx (1891), and he was also a eugenicist.

==== Frank Ramsey ====
Wittgenstein had left Britain and served for the Austro-Hungarian Army in World War I, subsequently writing the logical atomist Tractatus Logico-Philosophicus (1921) with its picture theory of meaning. Frank Ramsey (1903–1930) and Charles Kay Ogden (1889–1957) translated the Tractatus into English. Ogden founded the Heretics Society, which included McTaggart and Ramsey. Ogden with I. A. Richards (1893–1979) wrote The Meaning of Meaning (1923).

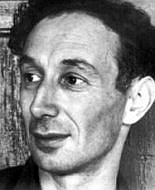
Logical positivist A. J. Ayer

Wittgenstein returned to Cambridge in 1929. Among others, Ramsey influenced Wittgenstein's radical shift to his later philosophy and theory of meaning as use exemplified by the posthumously published Philosophical Investigations (1953). (Note: Ramsey died of jaundice in 1930.) Wittgenstein's later philosophy was propounded by the likes of John Wisdom (1904–1993) and Rush Rhees (1905–1989).

==== A. J. Ayer ====
Wittgenstein's ideas were influential on the Vienna Circle. A. J. Ayer (1910–1989) was the first British philosopher to promote the Vienna Circle's philosophy of logical positivism and its doctrine of verificationism, particularly in his books Language, Truth and Logic (1936) and The Problem of Knowledge (1956). Ayer also advocated the ethical theory of emotivism, also known as the hurrah/boo theory, according to which valuing judgments expressed the attitude of the speaker.

==== Ordinary language philosophy ====
Influenced by the later Wittgenstein, Oxford ordinary language philosophy is a philosophical school that approaches traditional philosophical problems as rooted in misunderstandings that philosophers develop by forgetting what words mean in their everyday use.

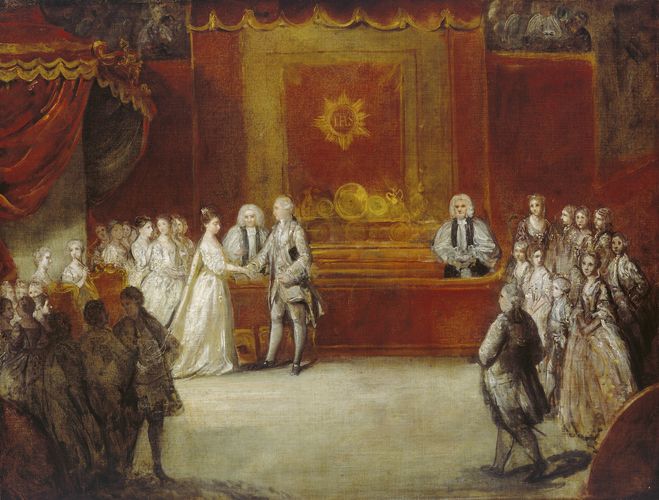
Wedding of George III and Princess Charlotte of Mecklenburg-Strelitz, oil sketch by Sir Joshua Reynolds (c. 1761). According to Austin's theory, when couples at a wedding say "I do", they are not using language to describe a wedding; they are using it to indulge in a wedding.

This approach typically involves eschewing philosophical theories, in favour of close attention to detail. Sometimes also called "Oxford philosophy", it is generally associated with the work of a number of mid-century Oxford professors: mainly J. L. Austin, but also Gilbert Ryle, and P. F. Strawson. It was a major philosophic school between 1930 and 1970.

Gilbert Ryle (1900–1976) in The Concept of Mind (1949), criticized Cartesian dualism, arguing in favor of disposing of "Descartes' myth" of the ghost in the machine by recognizing "category errors". Ryle sees Descartes' error as similar to saying one sees the campus, buildings, faculty, students, and so on, but still goes on to ask "Where is the university?"

P. F. Strawson (1919–2006) wrote the article "On Referring" (1950), a criticism of Russell's theory of descriptions. On Strawson's account, the use of a description presupposes the existence of the object fitting the description. In his book Individuals (1959), Strawson examines our conceptions of basic particulars.

J. L. Austin (1911–1960) in the posthumously published How to Do Things with Words (1962), articulated the theory of speech acts and emphasized the ability of words to do things (e.g. "I promise") and not just say things. (Note: This influenced several fields to undertake what is called a performative turn.) In Sense and Sensibilia (1962), Austin criticized sense-data theories.

H. L. A. Hart (1907–1992) wrote the legal positivist The Concept of Law (1961), which contains the rule of recognition.

Paul Grice (1913–1988) developed the theory of the cooperative principle and implicature in pragmatics.

=== Contemporary philosophy ===
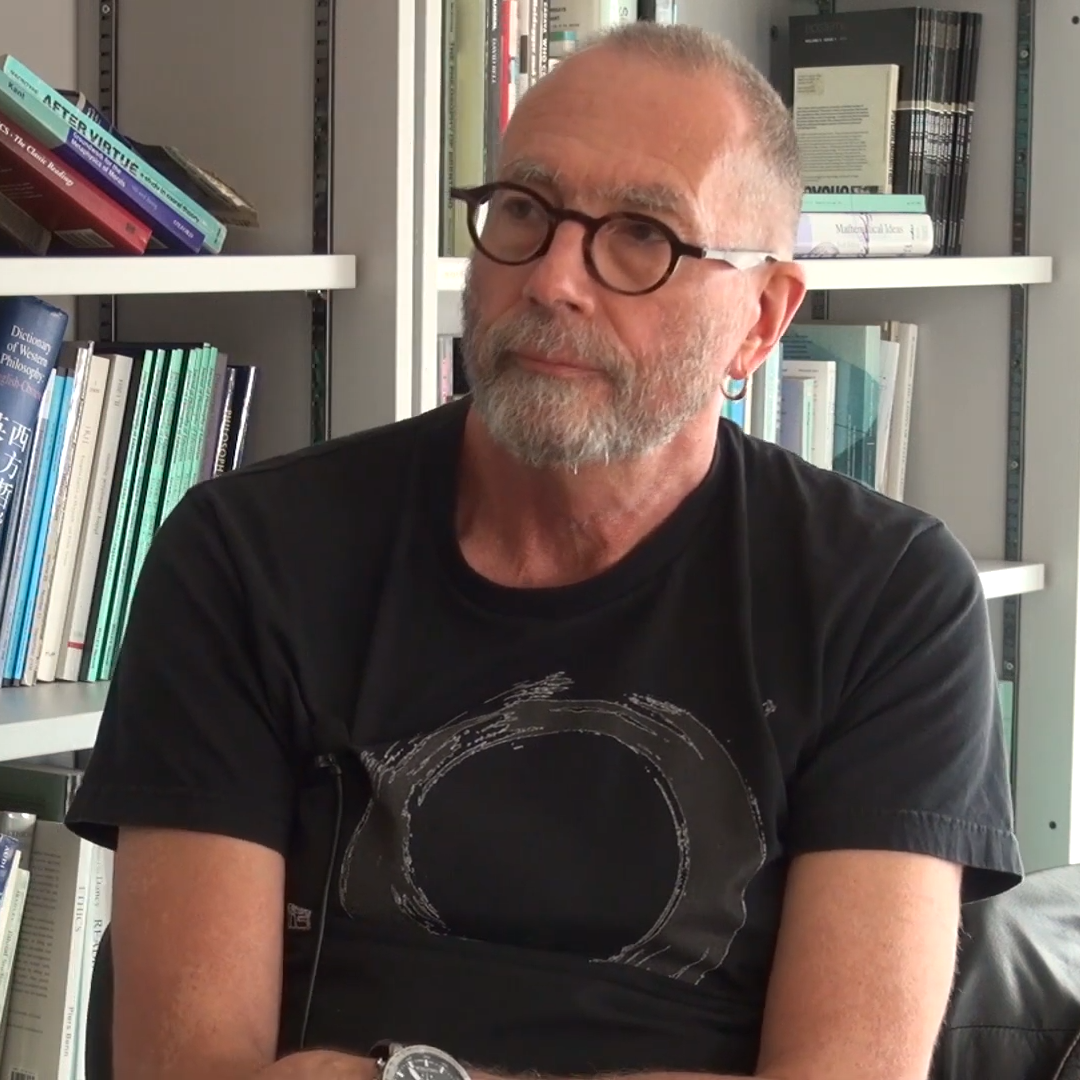
Graham Priest specializes in logic.

The vast majority of British philosophers continue to work in the analytic tradition, and have focused on fields such as logic, metaphysics, philosophy of language and philosophy of mind. The British Philosophical Association began in 2002.

==== Logic ====
Casimir Lewy (1919–1991) was a logician from Poland taught by John Wisdom. Wilfrid Hodges' (b. 1941) book Model Theory (1993) is a standard textbook. Graham Priest (b. 1948) advocates dialetheism, the view that the law of non contradiction is false. Graham Priest's An Introduction to Non-Classical Logic (2001) is a textbook in non-classical logic. Priest also defends noneism, a belief in nonexistent objects, utilizing the other worlds strategy. Alexander Paseau is a logical monist, disagreeing with logical pluralism. Dorothy Edgington (b. 1941) is notable for her work on conditionals.

==== Metaphysics ====
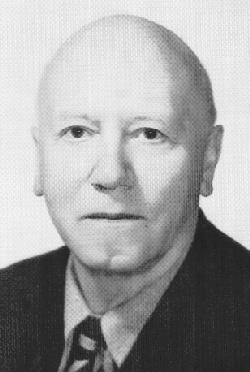
Charlie Broad wrote on philosophy of time.

Anthony Quinton (1925–2010) defended nominalism. David Wiggins (b. 1933) proposed conceptualist realism, a position according to which our conceptual framework maps reality. Deeply influenced by continental philosophy, Ray Brassier (b. 1965) pioneered speculative realism. Accelerationist Nick Land (b. 1962) was influenced by speculative realism and is known for Fanged Noumena (2011).

Adrian William Moore (b. 1956) argues it is possible to represent the world from no point-of-view. Stephen Mumford (b. 1965) argued for dispositionalism.

===== Philosophy of time =====
Eddington conceived of the arrow of time. Charlie Broad (1887–1971) shaped discussion of the moving spotlight theory and endorsed the growing block theory. John Lucas (1929–2020) believed in a branching future.

New Zealander Arthur Prior (1914–1969) worked in Britain and pioneered the A-theory of time. Prior was also influential for his contributions to tense logic and intensional logic. Hugh Mellor (1938–2020) and Robin Le Poidevin (b. 1962) advance the B-theory.

==== Philosophy of mathematics ====
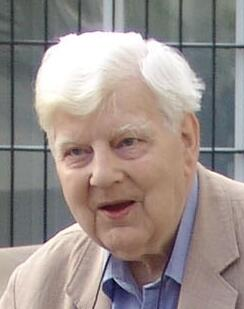
Michael Dummett defended semantic anti-realism.

G. H. Hardy (1877–1947) was an associate of both the Bloomsbury Group and the Cambridge Apostles. Hardy in A Mathematician's Apology (1940) is a platonic realist. Crispin Wright (b. 1942), along with Bob Hale (1945–2017), advocated neo-Fregean platonism in Frege's Conception of Numbers as Objects (1983), where he argues Frege's logicist project could be revived, and avoid Russell's Paradox by removing the axiom schema of unrestricted comprehension (Basic Law V) from the formal system. Wright instead emphasizes Hume's principle.

James F. Thomson (1921–1984), husband of Judith Jarvis Thomson (1929–2020), devised the Thomson's lamp thought experiment to analyze supertasks and infinity.

==== Philosophy of language ====
Gareth Evans (1946–1980) criticized the causal theory of reference. Mark Sainsbury (b. 1943) defends an "originalist" theory of concepts. Michael Dummett (1925–2011) was deeply influenced by Frege, and argues for semantic anti-realism and proof-theoretic semantics. Linguist Deirdre Wilson (b. 1941) pioneered relevance theory. Jennifer Hornsby (b. 1951) is influenced by Austin's speech act theory. Barry C. Smith defends linguist Noam Chomsky's views of language.

==== Philosophy of mind ====
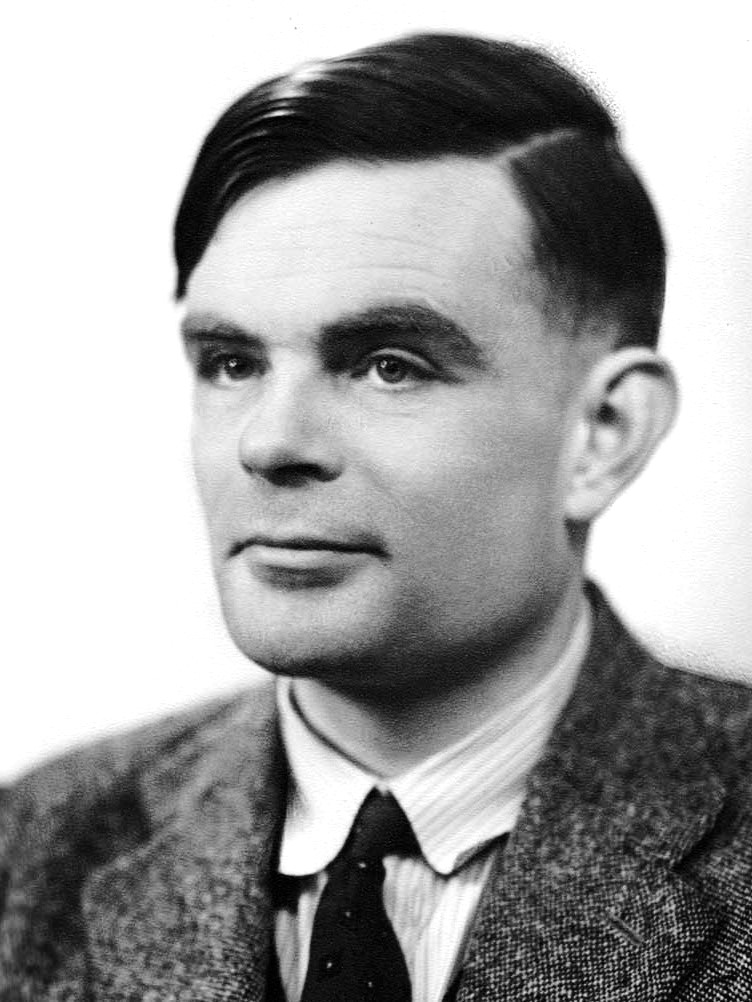
Alan Turing influenced functionalism.

H. H. Price (1889–1984) worked in the philosophy of perception and hallucinations. The paper of Ullin Place (1941–2009) "Is Consciousness a Brain Process?" (1956) launched the identity theory of mind. The founder of computer science Alan Turing (1912–1954) influenced functionalism, the most popular theory of mind, with concepts like the Turing machine and the Turing test.

Andy Clark (b. 1957) is notable for the extended mind thesis, that the mind extends into the physical world, which he proposed with Australian philosopher David Chalmers, notable for the hard problem of consciousness. Colin McGinn (b. 1950) finds the problem impossible to solve, advocating new mysterianism.

Anthony Kenny (1931–2026) criticized Cartesian dualism. Ted Honderich (1933–2024) defended physicalism. Christopher Peacocke (b. 1950) argues for realism and against reductionism.

Tim Crane (b. 1962) defends anti-physicalism. A number of British philosophers are panpsychists. Timothy Sprigge (1932–2007) defended a panpsychist version of British idealism. P. F. Strawson's son Galen Strawson (b. 1952) is a panpsychist. Philip Goff (b. 1978) defends panpsychism.

==== Christian philosophy ====
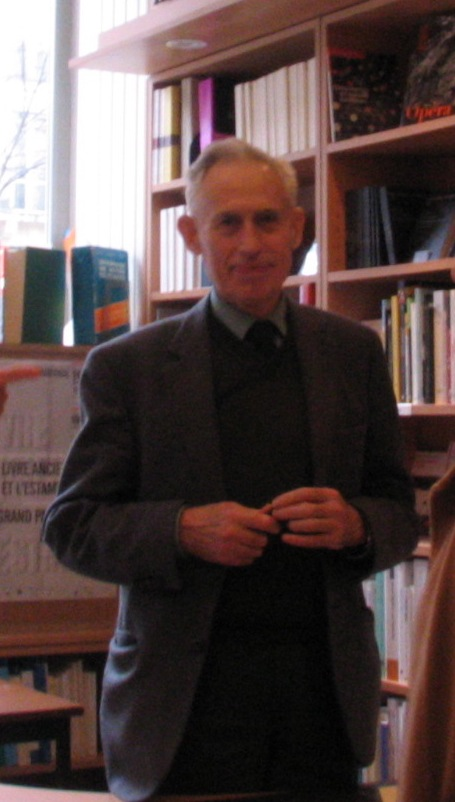
Richard Swinburne is a Christian philosopher.

Recent British philosophers have been particularly active in the philosophy of religion. Antony Flew (1923–2010) notably converted to Christianity from atheism. The Handbook of Anglican Theologians, described existentialist John Macquarrie (1919–2007) as "unquestionably Anglicanism's most distinguished systematic theologian in the second half of the 20th century." John Hick (1922–2012) advocated religious pluralism. Don Cupitt (1934–2025) was a "radical theologian".

Lay theologian C. S. Lewis (1898–1963) wrote Mere Christianity (1952), including Lewis's trilemma of "Lunatic, Liar, or Lord." Lewis also penned The Abolition of Man (1943).

Richard Swinburne (b. 1934) is an Oxford professor and Eastern Orthodox convert who wrote a trilogy of books arguing for God, The Coherence of Theism (1977), The Existence of God (1979), and Faith and Reason (1981). He is notable for his belief that God's existence is contingent rather than necessary (it is possible God does not exist), but that nonetheless He does exist as a brute fact.

John Haldane (b. 1954) is a Catholic Thomist. A student and friend of Wittgenstein, Elizabeth Anscombe (1919–2001) and her husband Peter Geach (1916–2013) were also Catholics. Geach defends relative identity so as to defend the Trinity. Anthony Kenny worked with Geach. Kenny was introduced to Wittgenstein's work by Anscombe, and became a leading scholar, the executor of Wittgenstein's literary estate.

==== Swansea school ====
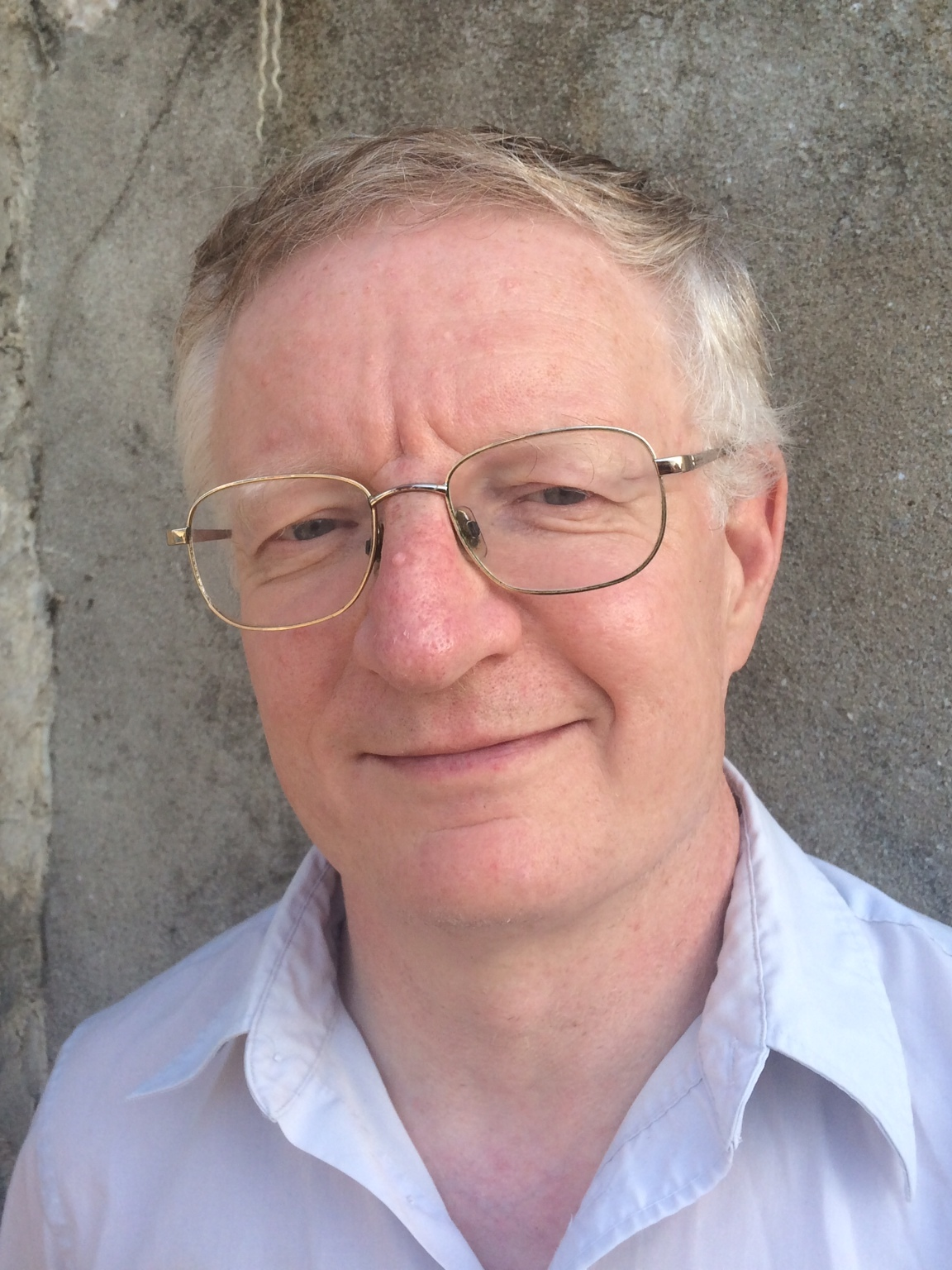
Timothy Williamson is an epistemologist.

The analytic philosophy of religion has been preoccupied with Wittgenstein, as well as his interpretation of Søren Kierkegaard. Wittgenstein fought for the Austrian army in World War I and came upon a copy of Russian Leo Tolstoy's The Gospel in Brief (1896). He subsequently underwent some kind of religious conversion. "Swansea school" philosophers such as Peter Winch (1926–1997) and D. Z. Phillips (1934–2006), among others, founded a school of religious thought based on Wittgenstein. The name "contemplative philosophy" was coined by Phillips in Philosophy's Cool Place (1999), after a passage quoted in Wittgenstein's Culture and Value (1980).

==== Epistemology ====
Timothy Williamson (b. 1955) argues knowledge is sui generis and for a "knowledge first" epistemology in Knowledge and Its Limits (2000). Duncan Pritchard (b. 1974) advances Wittgensteinian hinge epistemology, which stems from Wittgenstein's On Certainty. John Hawthorne (b. 1964) defends a view according to which knowledge is dependent on the subject's interests; he calls this view "subject-sensitive invariantism". Miranda Fricker (b. 1966) coined the term epistemic injustice.

==== Ethics ====
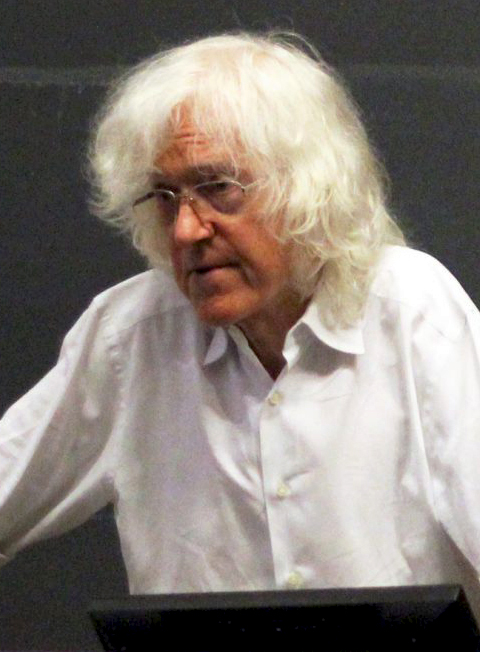
Derek Parfit was a moral philosopher.

After Moore's work, not much was done in analytic philosophy with ethics until the 1950s and 1960s, when there was a renewed interest in traditional moral philosophy. Exceptions include H. A. Prichard (1871–1947) whose ethical intuitionism in "Does Moral Philosophy Rest on a Mistake?" (1912) and W. D. Ross (1877–1971) in The Right and the Good (1930).

Philippa Foot (1920–2010) defended naturalist moral realism and contributed several essays attacking other theories. Foot introduced the famous "trolley problem" into the ethical discourse. Elizabeth Anscombe wrote a monograph Intention (1957) with an influential treatment of action. Her article "Modern Moral Philosophy" (1958) criticized consequentialism. In action theory, Stuart Hampshire also wrote Thought and Action (1959). Anscombe, Foot, and Alasdair Macintyre (1929–2025) with After Virtue (1981) sparked a revival of Aristotle's virtue ethical approach. (Note: This increased interest in virtue ethics has been dubbed by some the "aretaic turn".)

Reasons and Persons (1984) by Derek Parfit (1942–2017) has been described as the most significant work of moral philosophy since the 1800s. It is also influential in discussions of personal identity, with thought experiments on teleportation and the fission and fusion of persons. Bernard Williams (1929–2003) was also a moral philosopher, who coined the term moral luck and advocated a kind of moral relativism. Williams also influentially challenged Locke's view on personal identity in "The Self and the Future" (1970).

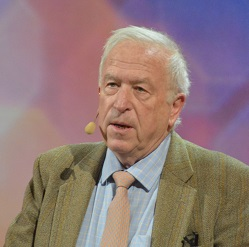
Simon Blackburn advances quasi-realism.

J. O. Urmson (1915–2012) gave his own "grading theory" in "On Grading" (1950) and was admiring but critical of emotivism in The Emotive Theory of Ethics (1968). R. M. Hare (1919–2002) is best known for his development of emotivism into prescriptivism and for his defence of preference utilitarianism.

G. J. Warnock (1923–1995) wrote The Object of Morality (1971). His wife was Mary Warnock (1924–2019). Onora O'Neill (b. 1941) is both a moral philosopher and a politician. Iris Murdoch (1919–1999), writer of The Sovereignty of Good (1970), was another notable author of ethical works.

Simon Blackburn (b. 1944) is a proponent of quasi-realism in meta-ethics. Jonathan Dancy (b. 1946) advances moral particularism. Roger Crisp (b. 1961) is a utilitarian. John Gray (b. 1948) attacks progress and humanism in Straw Dogs (2002). Anarchist Stephen R. L. Clark (b. 1945) is an advocate for animal rights. So was Mary Midgley (1919–2018).

==== Aesthetics ====
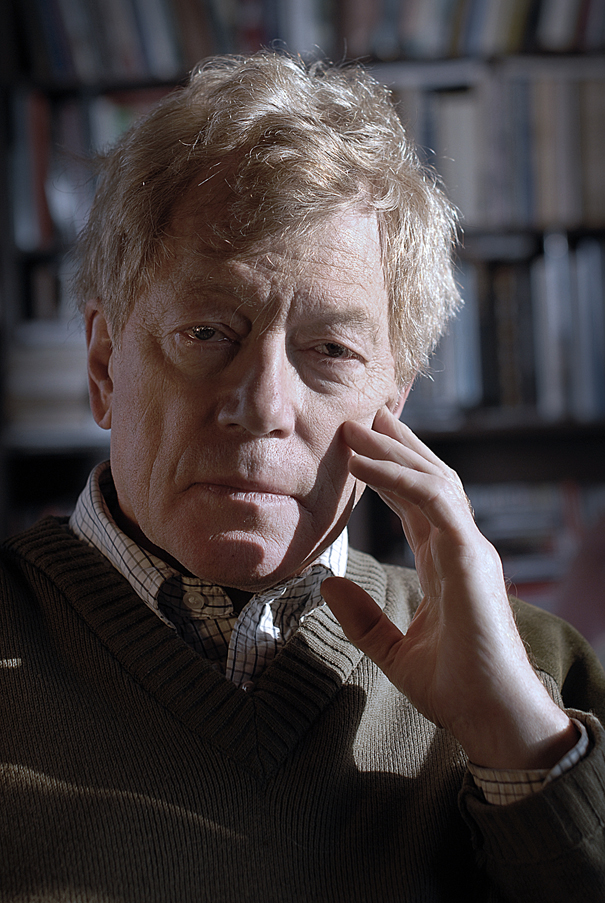
Roger Scruton was an aesthetician.

Clive Bell (1881–1964) of the Bloomsbury Group propounded the theory of significant form. British idealist R. G. Collingwood (1889–1943) developed a theory of aesthetic expressivism in The Principles of Art (1938). The British Society of Aesthetics was founded in 1960. Nick Zangwill (b. 1957) has defined his position as 'moderate formalism'. According to Kant scholar Paul Guyer, "After Wollheim, the most significant British aesthetician has been Roger Scruton." Roger Scruton (1944–2020) contributed to the philosophy of architecture.

==== Philosophy of science ====
Roy Bhaskar (1944–2014) initiated the school of critical realism in science. John Worrall (b. 1946) advocates structural realism. Michela Massimi advocates perspectival realism. Jeremy Butterfield (b. 1954) works in the philosophy of physics. Huw Price (b. 1953) is a kind of neo-pragmatist.

== See also ==
- List of British philosophers
- British Philosophical Association
- Scottish philosophy
- Irish philosophy
- American philosophy
