= Essays on the Active Powers of the Human Mind =

1788 work by Thomas Reid published in 1788

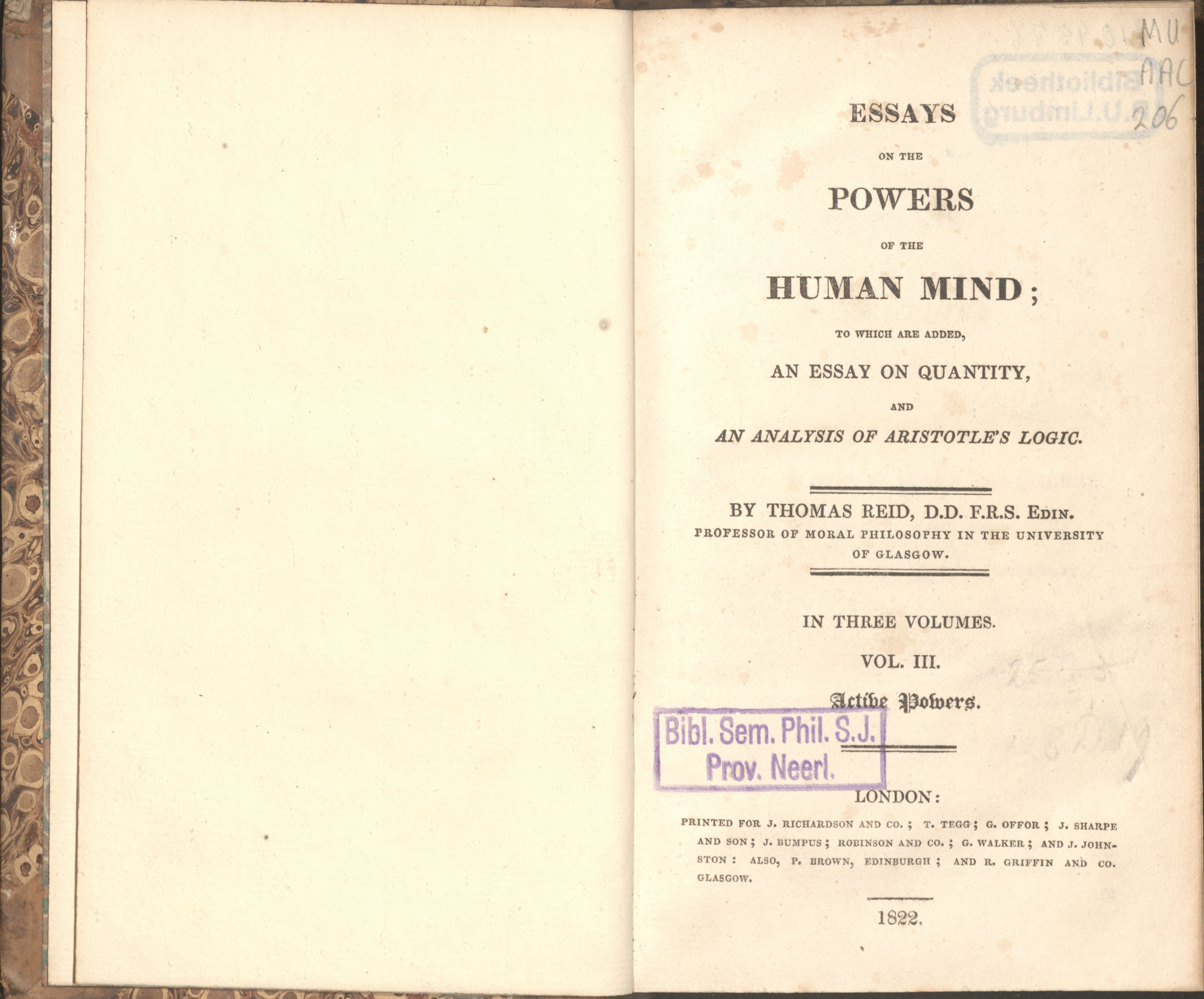
- Title page of the first edition (1788)
- Author: Thomas Reid
- Language: English
- Subject: Philosophy, moral psychology
- Genre: Non-fiction
- Publisher: Edinburgh
- Publication date: 1788
- Publication place: Scotland
- Preceded by: Essays on the Intellectual Powers of Man

Essays on the Active Powers of the Human Mind is a book written by the Scottish philosopher Thomas Reid. The first edition was published in 1788 in Edinburgh.

It is the third and last volume in a collection of his essays on the powers of the human mind and was preceded by the first book Inquiry into the Human Mind on the Principles of Common Sense (1764), in which Reid focused on the senses, and the second volume Essays on the Intellectual Powers of Man (1785), which focuses on human cognitive powers. In this third volume, Reid discusses the active behavioral nature of the human mind, including discourses about free will, principles of action and morals.

== Context ==
Reid's writings can be placed in the historical context of the emerging Scottish Enlightenment. This is a period of profound intellectual development and discourse in Scotland in the second half of the 18th century and beginning of the 19th century, especially revolving around the intellectual hub Edinburgh. During this period, Scottish philosophers including Hume, Smith and Stewart were disputing philosophical topics including questions about the human nature, morality and epistemology. Reid was especially in close correspondence with his contemporary David Hume. Letters show correspondence between the two philosophers. The author refers directly to Humes ideas in several of his books, including Essays on the Active Powers of the Human Mind. Even though in the current times Hume's philosophical ideas are much more well known, during their time Reid was at least equally renown. His ideas have been overshadowed among others due to later criticism from Kant and Hume.

The author was born into a parish family and was therefore educated in a Christian context. As a teenager he went to the Marischal college where he was taught by the philosopher George Turnbull and got in touch with Berkeley's philosophy. His education on Berkeley's philosophy may have influenced him later to reject the representationalist ideas. Both philosophers reject the epistemological standpoint that we perceive the objects of the worlds indirectly through ideas as mediators in our mind. However, Reid later counters Berkeley's idealism with his common sense realism, thereby disagreeing with Berkeley's standpoint that everything is mind-dependent, and everything is either a mind itself or an idea in the mind. During his theology studies and his position as a librarian, Reid further studied philosophical works by Locke, Hutchinson and Hume. In response he published his first more regarded essay and became Professor of philosophy at King's College. There he founded the Aberdeen Philosophical Society. In this context he critically discussed Hume's Treatise of Human Nature with contemporaries. Here Reid also began discussing his ideas that he later elaborated on in his essays on the human mind. Many of the discussions with his contemporaries were likely basis to his elaborated ideas in the book. After the publication of his first work Inquiry into the Human Mind on the Principles of Common Sense, Reid became Adam Smith's successor as professor for moral psychology at the University Glasgow. In 1780 Reid resigned from his position in order to devote himself exclusively to his philosophical enquiries and the writing of his essays.

== Contents ==
Essays on the Active Powers of the Human Mind is divided into five essays, each covering different aspects of human active powers. These include a general introductory definition of active powers, discussions on the will, moral judgement, and mechanical, animal and rational principles of action. Each essay is further subdivided into several chapters. The main ideas the author discussed throughout the five essays are the notion of active powers, the will, principles of action, and moral agency and responsibility.

The author conceding that no definition of power fully captures its essence. However, he provides a series of statements to further examine the concept of power. He asserts that power neither an operation of our external sense nor a product of the mind and our consciousness. Reid differentiates direct/primary qualities (objects about which we can get direct knowledge from our senses and know what they are in themselves) and relative qualities, where objects can only be defined by their properties or in relation to other things. According to Reid, power is a relative concept, as it can only be defined when it is exerted or produces an effect. Additionally he notes that power cannot exist without a subject to which it belongs. However, he concedes that observing the exertion of power does not allow us to determine the intended or the degree of power possessed by an individual. Reid distinguishes between "active powers (including all kinds of labor etc.)" and "speculative powers".

Reid explores the nature of the will, distinguishing between voluntary and involuntary actions. He argues for the existence of free will, countering the determinism prevalent in the philosophies of several of his contemporaries.

The author identifies and examines various principles that guide human actions, including instincts, desires, and affections. He emphasizes the role of reason and common sense in regulating these principles.

In the last essay, Reid discusses the topic of moral responsibility. Some of his first principles (which he defines as foundational principles that appeal to "common sense" and are taken for granted and can therefore not be further deduced by reasoning) of morals include:

- that the action has to be voluntary to be morally evaluated ("what is in no degree voluntary can neither deserve oral approbation nor blame", "what is done from unavoidable necessity [...] cannot be object either of blame or of moral approbation")
- an evaluation as immoral can result either from an action or from the omission of an action
- Reid sees it as "duty" and revealing the "true worth of a man" to have reflected thoroughly about his moral foundations in a well informed manner and to always have these moral foundations in mind and act accordingly, avoiding temptations
- humans are the only living beings that are capable of acting according to or against their moral intention
- everyone should do as much good as possible to the societies he belongs to (including mankind overall but also family, neighborhoods, etc. in the smaller context)
- one should act towards others in a way one would judge to be right (or how one would like to be treated)
- moral judgment develops similarly to mathematical skills as one matures and can be aided or hurt by proper education

== Reception ==
Reid's work played a major role in the development of Scottish Common Sense Realism, a philosophical movement that emerged as a response to the skepticism of thinkers like David Hume. Reid argues that basic principles—such as the reality of the external world, the reliability of perception, and the existence of free will—are self-evident and grounded in common sense. He uses common sense as argument and epistemological way. This provided a counterpoint to the increasingly abstract and skeptical tendencies of Enlightenment philosophy. In his arguments Reid emphasized the direct perception of reality, which influenced not only his immediate followers but also later philosophers in both Europe and America. Due to Kant's strong critique and the latter's authority, an appropriate reception of Reid's philosophy was hindered in Germany. However, the German philosopher Arthur Schopenhauer was a strong supporter of Reid's suggestions and agreed with his careful distinction of sensation and perception. While his work was not as much appreciated in Germany and England, it had a great impact on the French philosophy at that time and the philosophy of common sense was the dominant philosophy at American universities for half a century. This philosophy of common sense at American universities laid the groundwork for the American Pragmatism of the 19th and 20th centuries. Reid criticized the doctrine of his time which suggested that mental entities or ideas were the direct entities of thinking and that ideas only exist in the mind. This critique revived 150 years later in the writings of Bertrand Russell who also saw ideas rather as "curtain" between the outer reality and ourselves. The topic of human action and moral responsibility, as discussed in Reid’s Essays on the Active Powers of the Human Mind, evolved further in the centuries following its publication. By the mid-20th century, debates about free will were reframed in more psychological and neuroscientific terms and the debate gained new attention due to Libet's experiment which called the existence of free will into question.

After the publication of Essays on the Active Powers of the Human Mind, Reid spent the remaining eight years of his life in a relatively quieter period and did not publish any further philosophical writings. He remained active within his circle of philosophers in Edinburgh and Glasgow debating philosophical ideas in those years. Reid died in 1796.
