= Scottish philosophy =

Scottish philosophy is a philosophical tradition created by philosophers belonging to Scottish universities. Although many philosophers such as Francis Hutcheson, David Hume, Thomas Reid, and Adam Smith are familiar to almost all philosophers it was not until the 19th century that the notion of 'Scottish philosophy' became recognized and highly regarded internationally. In the 20th century, however, this tradition declined as Scottish-educated philosophers left for England.

== Medieval Scotland ==
Early Scottish philosophy served Christian theology, so the main topics of medieval philosophy concern the philosophy of religion. This emphasized problems such as the origins of sin and the corruption of human nature, the problem of evil, and divine foreknowledge.

In the High Middle Ages, Adam of Dryburgh (c. 1140–c. 1212) was a follower of Augustine who believed in free will, but that sin made us require divine grace.

=== Michael Scot ===
Michael Scot (1175–c. 1232) traveled to Toledo, known for its school of translators of Greek and Arabic sources. Michael Scot translated Aristotle, Avicenna, and Averroes, and was the greatest public intellectual of his day.

=== John Duns Scotus ===
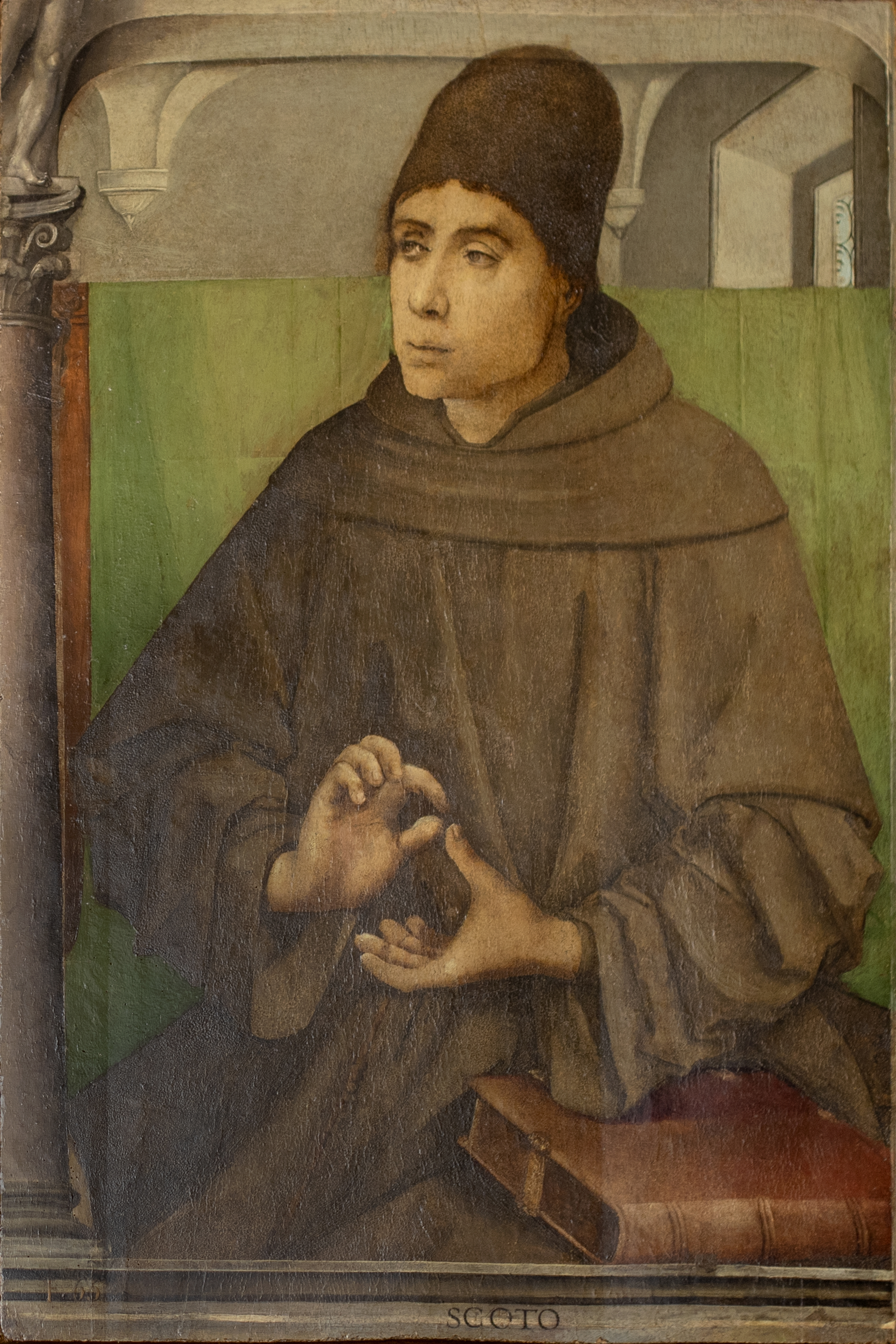
John Duns Scotus

Nicknamed Doctor Subtilis (the subtle doctor), John Duns Scotus (1265-1308) was a Franciscan friar who made significant contributions to the areas of natural theology, metaphysics, the theory of knowledge, ethics and moral philosophy. Scotus was born at Duns in Berwickshire. In 1291, he was ordained as a priest in Northampton, England. A note in Codex 66 of Merton College, Oxford, records that Scotus "flourished at Cambridge, Oxford and Paris". He was beatified by Pope John Paul II in 1993.

Scotism was the main alternative to the philosophy of Thomism. Scotism believes in the univocity of being rather than the equivocity of being. Scotism also believed in haecceity or "thisness". Scotus’s stance on natural theology is that human beings can come to know God in ways apart from revelation. Scotus believes that all our knowledge is derived from our experience of sensible things and from this beginning, we can come to grasp God.

== Renaissance Scotland ==
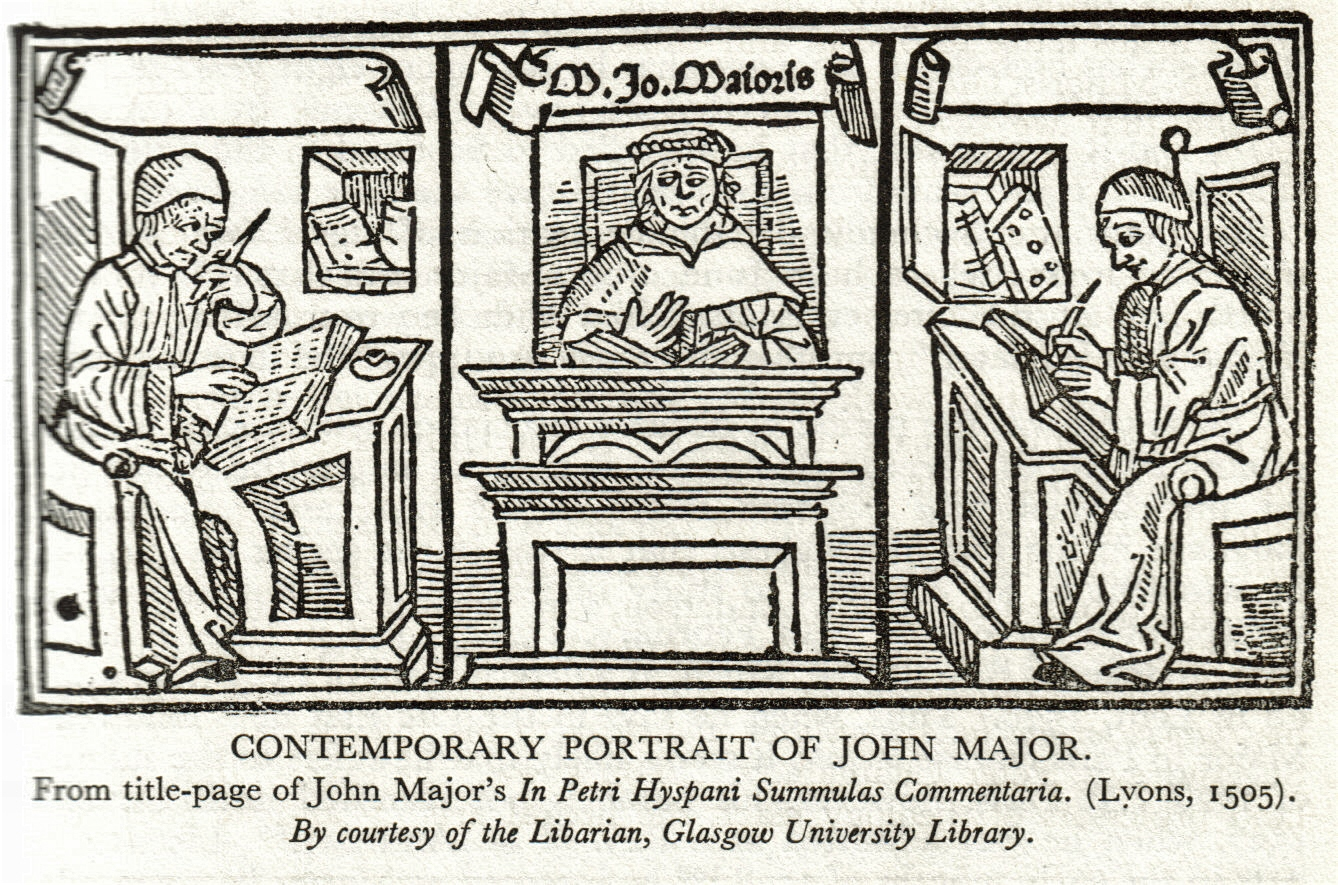
John Major in a contemporary woodcut.

During the 15th century, Scotland established three universities that were to become the foundation of the Scottish philosophical tradition, these were University of St Andrews, the University of Glasgow and the University of Aberdeen. Philosophy was compulsory for all university students. While this pre-enlightenment period was primarily focused on philosophers who merely rehabilitated their predecessors – the writings of Plato and Aristotle – this period was not without its accomplishments.

John Major (1467–1550) was a nominalist influenced by French philosopher Jean Buridan. His pupil was George Lokert (c. 1485–1547). Major also influenced Hector Boece (1465–1536). Boece was the first principal of King's College, Aberdeen.

=== Reformation ===
Following the Reformation, King's College was purged of its Roman Catholic staff but remained largely resistant to change in its methods. George Keith (c. 1553–1623), the fifth Earl Marischal, however was a moderniser within the college and supportive of the reforming ideas of Peter Ramus. In April 1593 Keith founded a second university in the city, Marischal College. Andrew Melville (1545–1622) had introduced Ramus into Scotland.

=== Natural philosophy ===
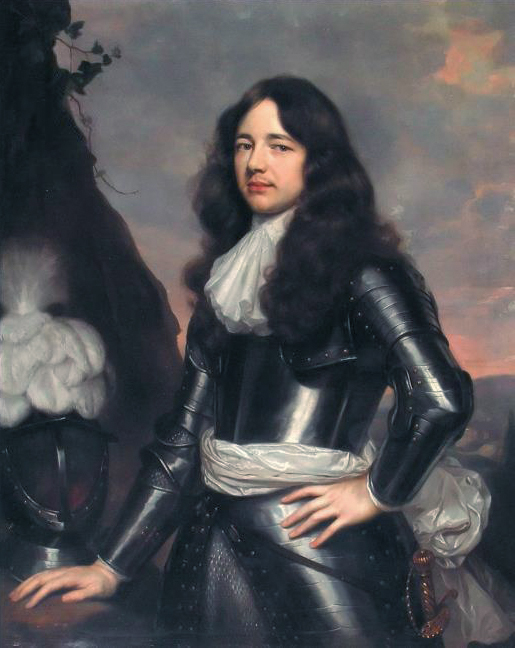
Alexander Bruce

The invention of the logarithmic tables by Protestant John Napier (1550-1617) allowed the development of the sciences, or natural philosophy, while significant contributions to science were made by other Scots such as James Gregory (1638-1675), Robert Sibbald (1641-1722) and Archibald Pitcairne (1652-1713). Scottish soldier Robert Moray (1609-1673) was a member of the Royal Society and a Freemason Alexander Bruce, 2nd Earl of Kincardine (1629–1681) was also a member of the Royal Society and a Freemason. Gregory made a telescope. Bruce collaborated with Dutch natural philosopher Christiaan Huygens in developing a marine pendulum clock.

=== Cartesianism ===
In the second half of the 17th century, Scottish universities developed their own form of Cartesianism, influenced in large part by Reformed Scholasticism of the first half of the 17th century. Mention of Descartes first appeared in the graduation theses by regent Andrew Cant (c.1626–1685) for Marischal College, the University of Aberdeen in 1654. Cartesianism was very successful in Scottish universities. Until the end of the 1660s, the universities gradually incorporated occasional Cartesianism themes into the scholastic structure of the curriculum. Later, in the 1670s the curriculum was consolidated and structured according to the order of exposition of the new philosophy.

== 18th century ==
Scottish philosophy of this time overlaps with the period of Scottish Enlightenment. Scottish philosophers of this time were extensively studied. The prominent ideas of this century include natural law, moral philosophy, aesthetics, and common sense philosophy.

The three 'classic' British empiricists in the early modern era were English philosopher John Locke (1632–1704), Irish philosopher George Berkeley (1685–1753), and the Scottish David Hume (1711–1776). The term "British empiricism" refers to the philosophical tradition in Britain that was epitomised by these thinkers.

A heavy influence on British empiricism and the Enlightenment was the work of natural philosopher Sir Isaac Newton (1643–1727) and his philosophy of Newtonianism. Newton published his Philosophiæ Naturalis Principia Mathematica in 1686, which included his laws of motion, introducing classical mechanics in physics. Child prodigy Colin Maclaurin (1698–1746) helped to popularize Newton in Scotland. George Turnbull (1698–1748) believed Newtonianism should influence moral philosophy.

After Berkeley, who was a subjective idealist, metaphysics was temporarily abandoned in all of Britain, with the exception of James Burnett (1714–1799).

=== David Hume ===
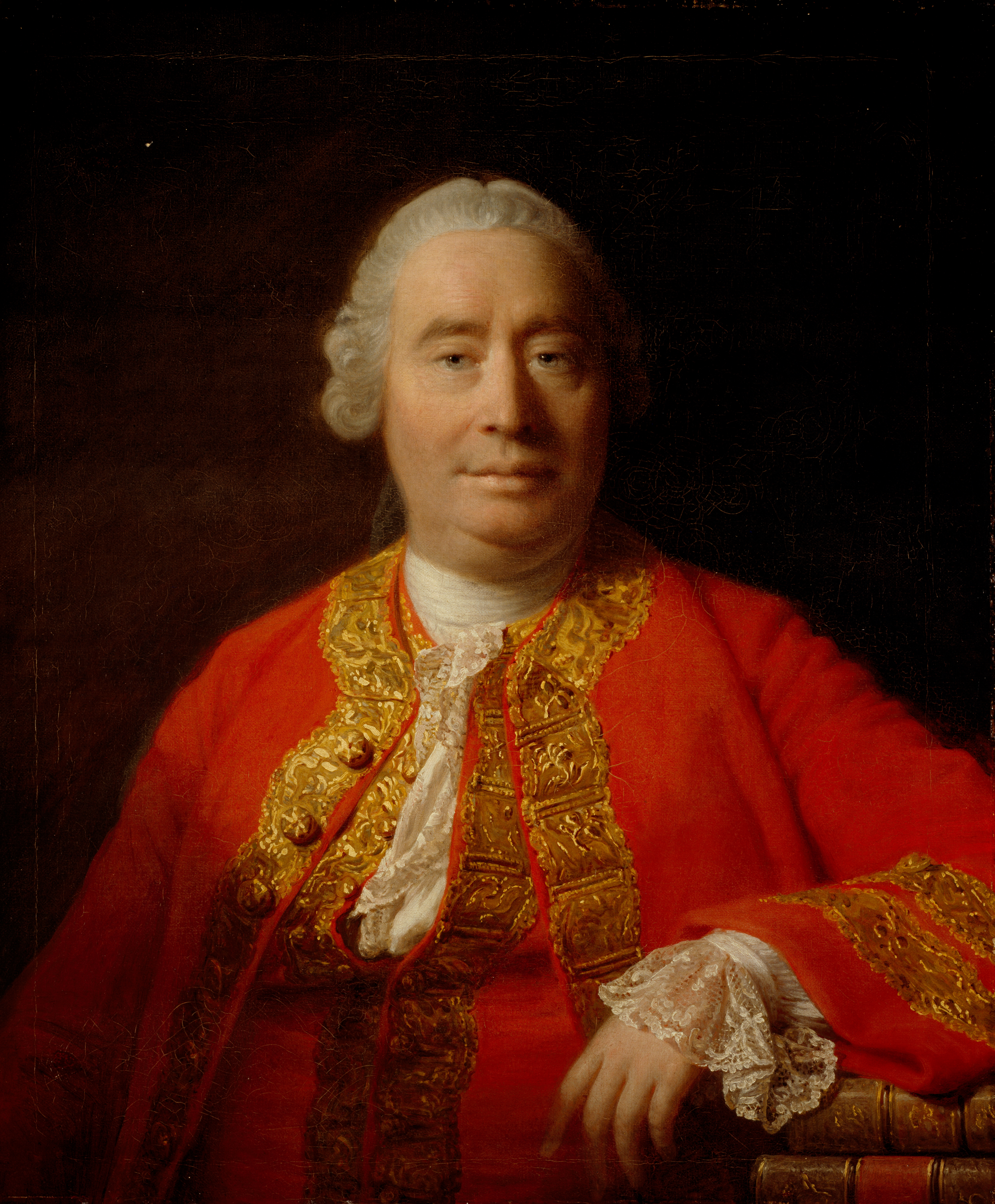
David Hume

David Hume was a philosopher, economist, and historian, and the founder of Humeanism. His major works, A Treatise of Human Nature (1739–1740), the An Enquiry concerning Human Understanding (1748), An Enquiry Concerning the Principles of Morals (1751), and Dialogues Concerning Natural Religion (1779) remain widely influential.

Hume described the problem of induction. He argues that inductive reasoning cannot be rationally employed, since, in order to justify induction, one would either have to provide a sound deductive argument or an inductively strong argument. But there is no sound deductive argument for induction, and to ask for an inductive argument to justify induction would be to beg the question.

Hume's problem of causation is related to his problem of induction. He held that there is no empirical access to the supposed necessary connection between cause and effect. In seeking to justify the belief that A causes B, one would point out that, in the past, B has always closely followed A in both space and time. But the special necessary connection that is supposed to be causation is never given in experience. Only a constant conjunction of events can be observed, with no necessity whatsoever. Hume's attack on causality was credited with waking German philosopher Immanuel Kant (1724–1804) from his "dogmatic slumber." (Note: Kant even claimed to be of Scottish heritage. Dugald Stewart tried to prove it.)

In personal identity, Hume was a bundle theorist. He said that there is no robust self to which properties adhere. Experience shows that there is only a bundle of perceptions. Hume also pointed out how one cannot deduce an 'ought' from an 'is'.

=== Adam Smith ===
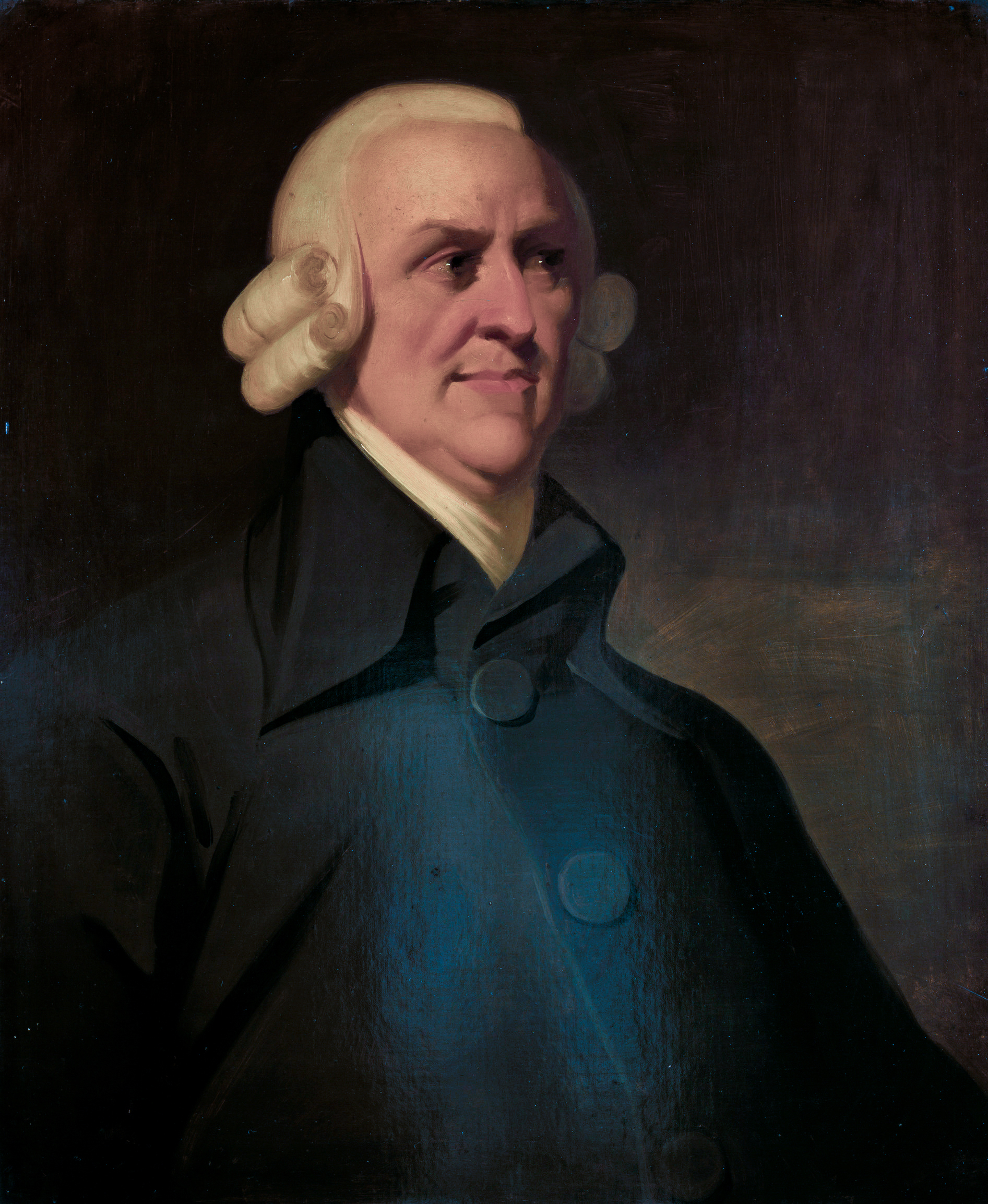
Adam Smith

Adam Smith (1723–1790) was a moral philosopher and a pioneer of political economics. Smith wrote The Theory of Moral Sentiments and An Inquiry into the Nature and Causes of the Wealth of Nations. The latter, usually abbreviated as The Wealth of Nations, is considered Smith's magnum opus. It is notable for its description of the invisible hand and is the first modern work of economics.

Smith studied moral philosophy at the University of Glasgow and the University of Oxford. After graduating, he delivered a successful series of public lectures at Edinburgh, leading him to collaborate with David Hume. Smith obtained a professorship at Glasgow teaching moral philosophy, and during this time he wrote and published The Theory of Moral Sentiments.

=== Francis Hutcheson ===
Francis Hutcheson (1694–1746) advocated utilitarianism, and inner senses of morality and aesthetics akin to physical external senses like sight and hearing. Hutcheson was also an early advocate of animal rights, and an influence on Gulliver's Travels author Jonathan Swift (1667–1745).

In America, John Witherspoon (1723–1794) became president at the College of New Jersey (now Princeton University) in 1768, expanded its natural philosophy offerings, purged the Berkeley adherents from the faculty, and taught his own Hutcheson-influenced form of Scottish moral philosophy.

=== Thomas Reid ===
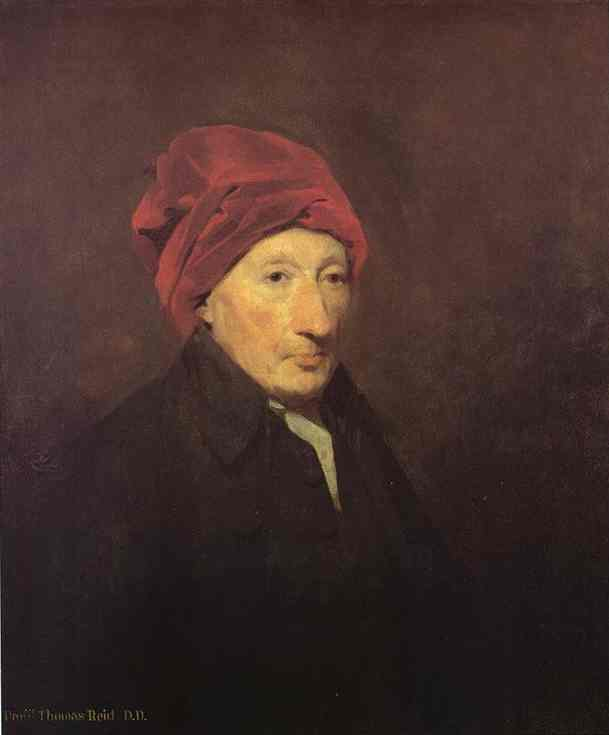
Thomas Reid

Thomas Reid (1710–1796) was a student of Turnbull and a critic of Hume. Reid advocated common sense and direct realism in works like An Inquiry Into the Human Mind on the Principles of Common Sense (1764) and two Essays: Essays on the Intellectual Powers of Man (1785) and Essays on the Active Powers of the Human Mind (1788). This school of thought influenced thinkers such as Dugald Stewart (1753–1828), Thomas Brown (1778–1820), and Sir William Hamilton (1788–1856).

According to Reid, Hume's skepticism and Berkeley's idealism were the intolerable consequences of Descartes and Locke's dogma of representationalism, which he called the "Way of Ideas." Reid states in any moment of veridical perception there is an object, a subject, and the act of perception. Reid doubts there is some further, fourth thing, the idea of the object in the subject's mind.

In America, Reid's philosophy influenced James Wilson (1742–1798) and Witherspoon's successor as Princeton president Samuel Stanhope Smith (1751–1819). In France, leader of the Doctrinaires group during the Bourbon Restoration, Pierre Paul Royer-Collard, lectured on Reid. In Germany, Johannes Nikolaus Tetens was influenced by Reid.

=== Natural law ===
The idea of "natural law" can first be found in Supplements and Observations upon Samuel Pufendorf's On the Duty of Man and Citizen according to the Law of Nature by Gershom Carmichael (1672–1729), which says that we are required to do what God prescribes to us as a sign of love and veneration. Failure to act in the prescribed manner is interpreted by God as expressing contempt or hatred. Natural law has two precepts which are distinguished as immediate and mediate duties. The first precept is the idea that we have an immediate duty to worship God so that he may receive our love and veneration for him. The second precept covers our mediate duties of promoting the common good by treating others well. These precepts form the foundation of natural law. The central figure of this narrative is God, hence before the application of the precepts in our duty as worshipers, we must first acknowledge God as the creator and ruler of the universe and all that resides within it.

Hutcheson succeeded Carmichael at Glasgow. Hume's is-ought gap questioned natural law.

=== Moral philosophy ===
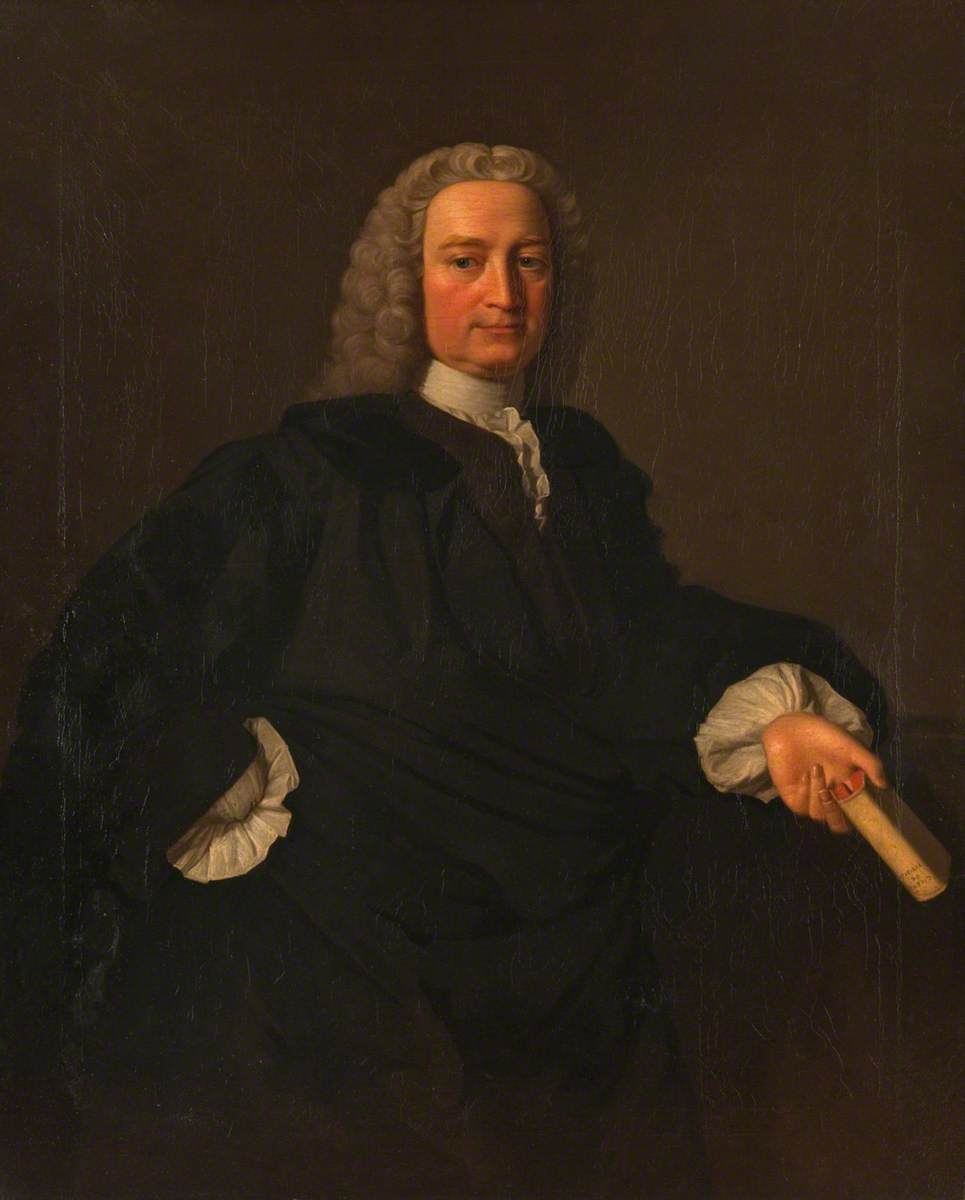
Francis Hutcheson

"Moral philosophy" is the idea that to be morally good one must be motivated by benevolence and a desire for the happiness of others. The idea of moral philosophy can be traced to Francis Hutcheson's work, A System of Moral Philosophy, in Three Books, first published in Glasgow in 1755. Hutcheson's moral philosophy emerged as a reaction to English philosopher Thomas Hobbes' (1588–1679) psychological egoism, and Samuel Clarke (1675–1729) and William Wollaston's (1659–1724) rationalism. The main objection was to the idea that compassion and benevolence are due to the calculations of self-interest and that people should be discouraged from making others sympathetic towards themselves since this reflected their self-interests and was therefore dishonest. Hutcheson believed that moral knowledge is gained through our moral senses, of which there are three, these senses are separate from our external five senses. The three senses are the public sense, the moral sense and the sense of honour. Public sense refers to how we empathize with the happiness or misery of others. The moral sense is how we perceive the good and bad ourselves and others and our reaction to that manifestation. Sense of honour our reaction of approval or praise when we see or commit a good action.

Smith similarly rejected self-interest, but departed from the moral sense tradition of Hutcheson, with the principle of sympathy taking its place. "Sympathy" was the term Smith used for the feeling of these moral sentiments. It was the feeling of understanding the passions of others. It operated through a logic of mirroring, in which a spectator imaginatively reconstructed the experience of the person he watches.

=== Aesthetics ===
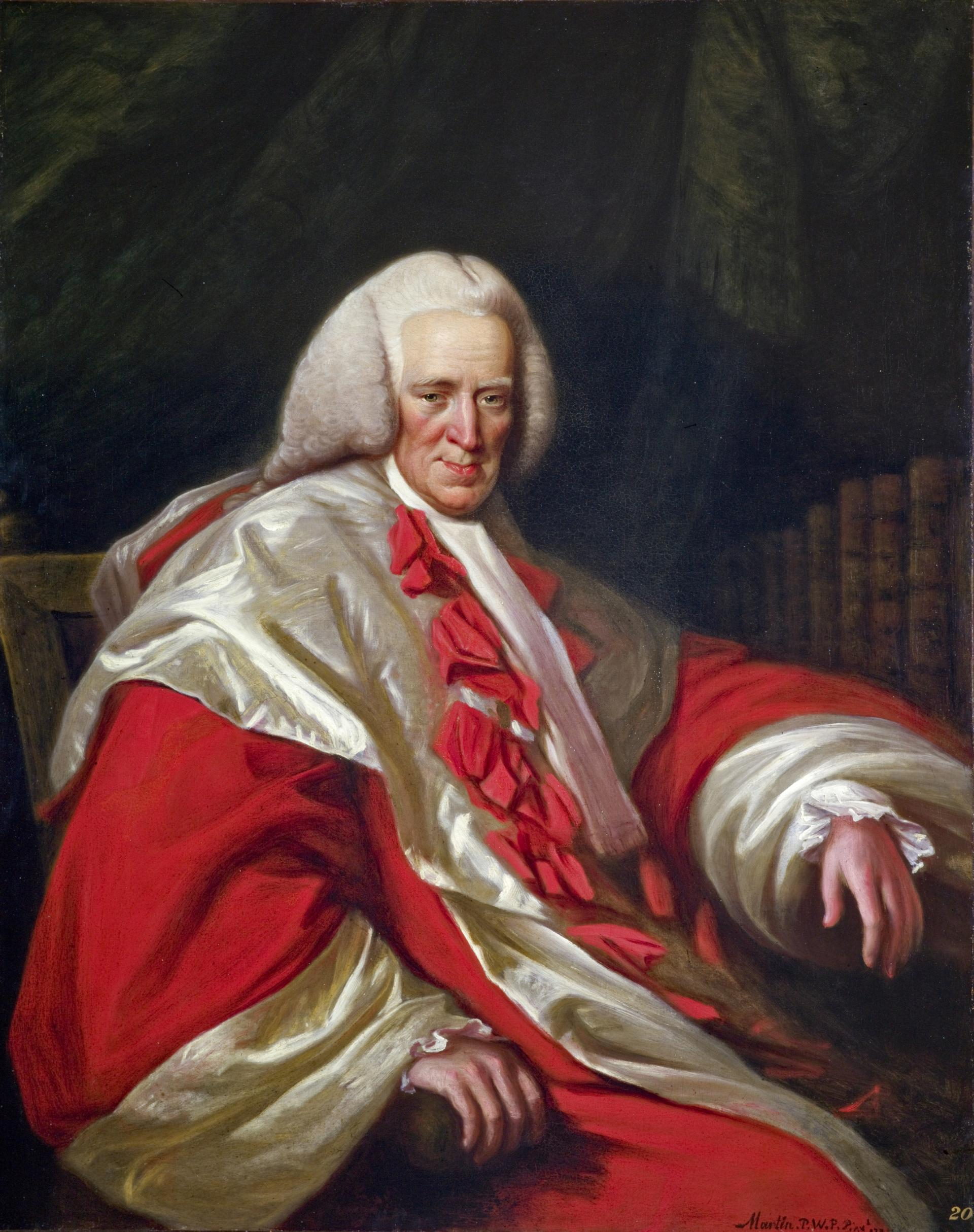
Lord Kames

Features of Hutcheson’s moral philosophy appear in his aesthetic theory, particularly his theory of our moral sense of beauty and the pleasure we take in it, which is not simply incidental to perceiving beauty.

Lord Kames (1696–1782) defines beauty as anything that you can derive pleasure from in his Essays on the Principles of Morality and Natural Religion. Something is considered beautiful when it is regarded with respect to its purpose while an object that is poorly designed or has no purpose may be considered ugly. Therefore, a house may be considered beautiful in light of its purpose as a human residence. Objects that are beautiful may give rise to the feeling of pleasure in the observer. Thus, a ship may give pleasure because it is elegantly shaped as well as because it facilitates trade which in turn is a positive beneficial exchange. Likewise, pleasure can be applied to human action, actions that carry a positive intent such as acts of generosity towards a worthy recipient can be considered beautiful. This derivation of pleasure from the display of generosity or other virtues can be traced to the original constitution of our nature, that is that we experience pleasure through no conscious decision of our own when we see beauty.

=== Royal Society of Edinburgh ===
Hume's physician William Cullen (1710–1790) assisted in obtaining a royal charter for the Philosophical Society of Edinburgh, resulting in the formation of the Royal Society of Edinburgh in 1783.

Dugald Stewart also assisted in founding the Royal Society of Edinburgh, and studied philosophy under Adam Ferguson (1723–1816). He followed the thought of Thomas Reid, except Stewart was a nominalist. Thomas Brown studied under Stewart and drifted even more from the common sense school. Brown's philosophy of the mind was reminiscent of Hume's empirical phenomenalism. Brown was speculated to be critical of Reid, although it was also hinted that the target of his criticisms was Stewart.

=== Industrial Revolution ===
James Watt and his business partner Matthew Boulton were members of the Lunar Society of Birmingham, founded by Erasmus Darwin, key figure of the Midlands Enlightenment. So was James Keir. Watt's steam engine was fundamental to the changes brought by the Industrial Revolution.

== 19th century ==
The influence of Immanuel Kant and German idealism on the philosophical tradition of the Scottish Enlightenment changed the philosophical agenda in the 19th century. Enlightenment thinking became less important and the "science of the mind" was discussed. Logic, also known as the philosophy of truth and reason and the philosophy of perception dominated, whereby human understanding evolves through increasing human experience and knowledge. Since the aim of philosophy was to reconcile the seemingly incompatible elements in the human experience, Scottish Idealists welcomed the growth of the natural sciences, especially biology as a source of new material for continual evolutionary development of human understanding.

=== Hamilton ===
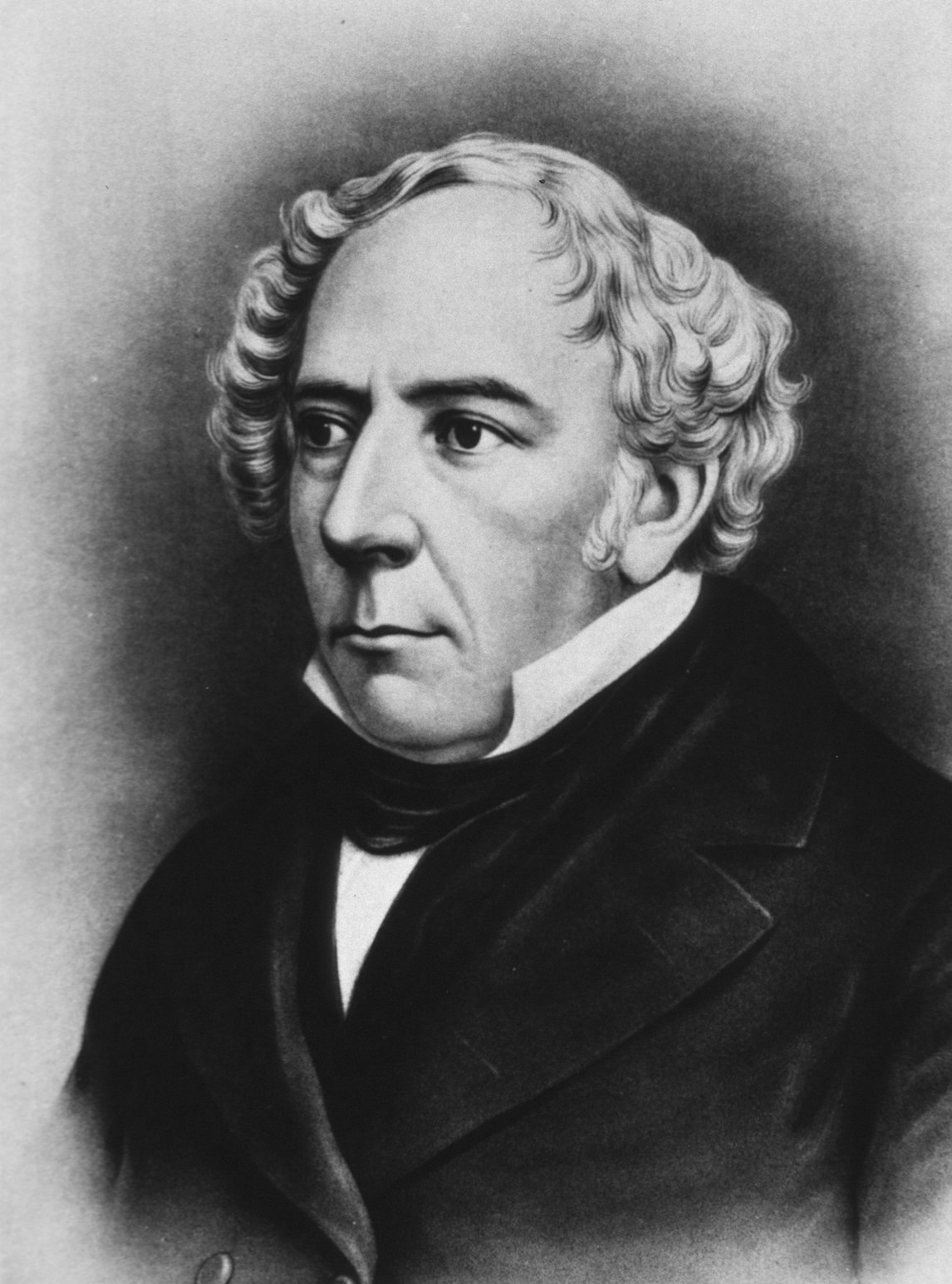
Sir William Hamilton

The influence of the German philosophical movement was brought into the Scottish philosophical tradition by Sir William Hamilton who combined Reid's common-sense philosophy with logic and Kant's philosophy. His essays on a review of Royer-Collard student Victor Cousin's (1792–1867) lectures and The Philosophy of Perception brought attention among Scottish philosophers to Kant and post-Kantian philosophy. Hamilton had studied at Heidelberg with his friend J. F. Ferrier (1808 – 1864). Another ambassador was Thomas Carlyle (1795–1881), whose Critical and Miscellaneous Essays introduced many English speakers to German philosophy, and whose own contributions make him a prominent figure in the Scottish philosophical tradition. (Note: Carlyle also parodied German idealism in Sartor Resartus.) James Hutchison Stirling (1820–1909) was a Hegel scholar who influenced British idealism. David George Ritchie helped found the Aristotelian Society.

British philosophy in the nineteenth century saw a revival of logic in reaction to the anti-logical aspects of British empiricism. This was started by Richard Whately (1787 – 1863), who wrote Elements of Logic (1826). The major figure of this period is mathematician George Boole (1815 – 1864). Scottish figures of the movement include Hamilton, and logician and novelist Hugh MacColl (1831–1909).

=== British empiricism and German idealism ===
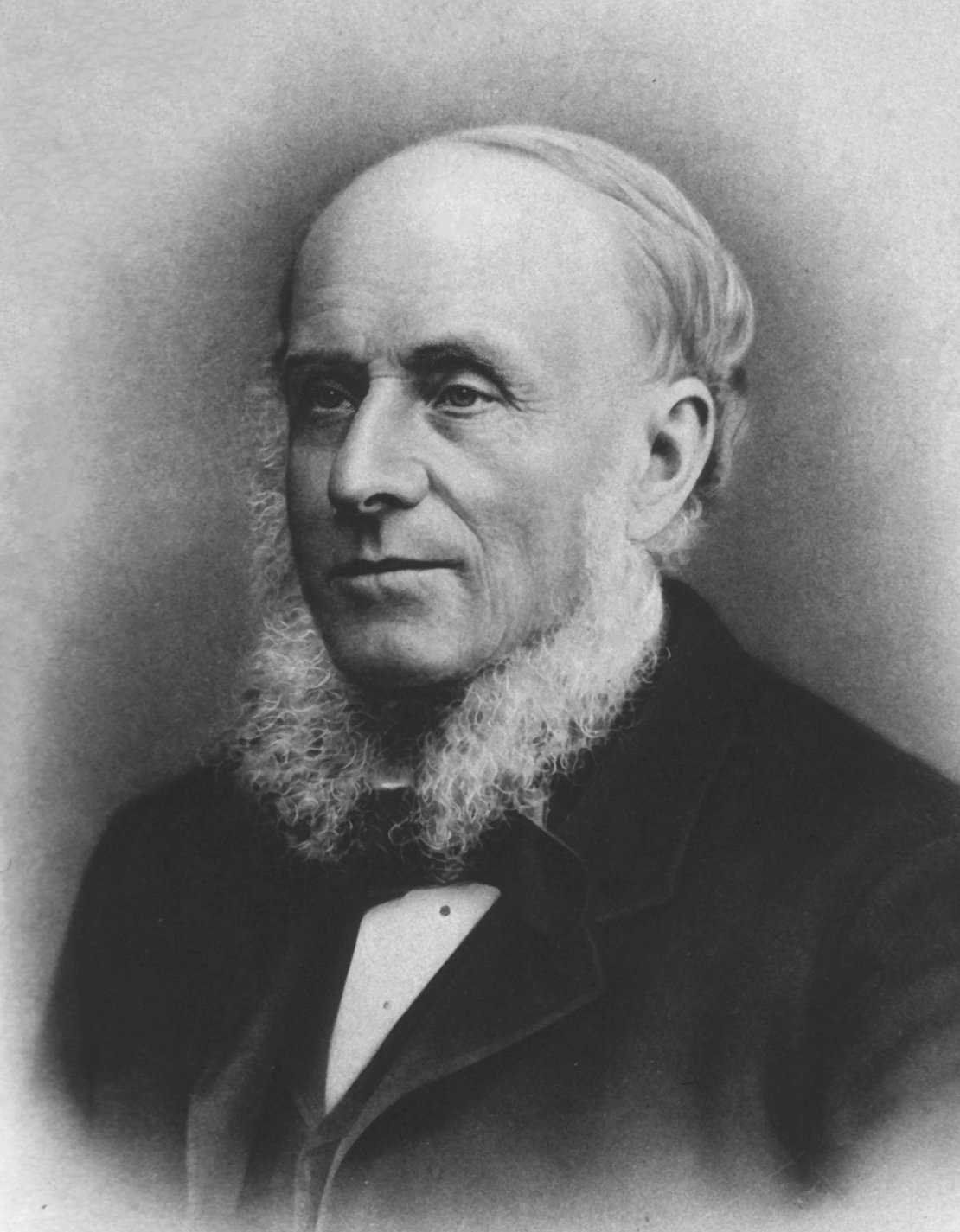
Alexander Bain

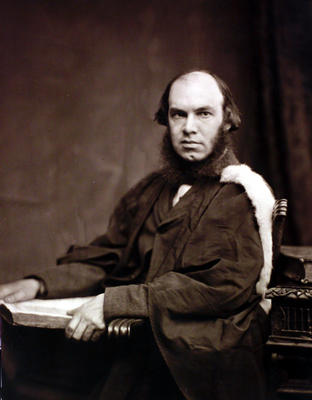
Edward Caird

Scottish philosophy began to acquire a self-conscious identity, which according to former Princeton president James McCosh (1811–1894), (Note: McCosh studied at the University of Glasgow, and later at the University of Edinburgh where he attended Hamilton's lectures as a divinity student.) now consists of two opposing strands: the first is the materialism of Alexander Bain (1818–1903), (Note: Bain founded the journal Mind.) and second the Hegelianism of Edward Caird (1835–1908).

Bain was a follower of British utilitarian John Stuart Mill, the son of James Mill. Bain advocated Mill's associationist theory of mind in works such as The Senses and the Intellect (1855) and The Emotions and the Will (1859). Caird was a student of Oxford's Benjamin Jowett, who taught many of the British idealists. John Watson who established Canadian idealism was a student of Caird.

Andrew Seth Pringle-Pattison was a personalist who opposed both the utilitarian and the Hegelian strands of philosophy in Scotland.

McCosh characterized Scottish philosophy as the combination of observational methods of inquiry combined with moral and religious formation. From McCosh's perspective, the increasing popularity of Scottish philosophy was a step in a different direction from the original methods and moral and religious standpoints. While the materialism of Bain retained the original observational methods, it abandoned moral formation. Additionally, the idealism of Caird abandoned religious formation. To McCosh, this signaled the demise of the Scottish philosophical tradition. McCosh was hopeful that the independence of the United States and the new American philosophy would preserve the best of Scottish philosophical tradition.

A champion of the thought of Friedrich Nietzsche was the Scottish scholar Thomas Common (1850–1919), who was one of the first to translate him into English.

=== Australian philosophy ===
Scottish philosophy had a strong influence on the development of Australian philosophy, especially through the persons of the first professors of philosophy at Sydney University and Melbourne University, Sir Francis Anderson and Henry Laurie, and John Anderson, Challis Professor of Philosophy at Sydney University from 1927 to 1958.

== 20th century ==
By the 20th century, the identity of Scottish philosophy came into decline and the distinction between Scottish and English philosophy began to be impractical. This is due to the increase in communication and movement between Scotland and England due to advances in transport. Traveling between Edinburgh and London could be accomplished in ten and a half hours via the Flying Scotsman, an express train service. This same journey would have taken two weeks in 1753 when a stagecoach service first operated. Traditionally, the continuation of Scottish philosophy relied on the teachers being succeeded by their students. The second half of the nineteenth century broke this relation as Scottish-educated philosophers left for England. Eventually, the changing social, political and economic conditions resulted in reforms that revitalized the university curriculum. Scottish philosophy came to be one subject among many.

== See also ==
- British philosophy
- Irish philosophy
