= Philosophy of perception =

Branch of philosophy

Checker shadow illusion

The two areas of the image that are marked A and B and the rectangle connecting them are all of the same shade: one's eyes automatically "correct" for the shadow of the cylinder.

The philosophy of perception is concerned with the nature of perceptual experience and the status of perceptual data, in particular how they relate to beliefs about, or knowledge of, the world. Any explicit account of perception requires a commitment to one of a variety of ontological or metaphysical views. Philosophers distinguish internalist accounts, which assume that perceptions of objects, and knowledge or beliefs about them, are aspects of an individual's mind, and externalist accounts, which state that they constitute real aspects of the world external to the individual. The position of naïve realism—the 'everyday' impression of physical objects constituting what is perceived—is to some extent contradicted by the occurrence of perceptual illusions and hallucinations and the relativity of perceptual experience as well as certain insights in science. Realist conceptions include phenomenalism and direct and indirect realism. Anti-realist conceptions include idealism and skepticism. Recent philosophical works have expanded on the philosophical features of perception by going beyond the single paradigm of vision (for instance, by investigating the uniqueness of olfaction).

== Scientific accounts of perception ==
An object at some distance from an observer will reflect light in all directions, some of which will fall upon the corneae of the eyes, where it will be focussed upon each retina, forming an image. The disparity between the electrical output of these two slightly different images is resolved either at the level of the lateral geniculate nucleus or in a part of the visual cortex called 'V1'. The resolved data is further processed in the visual cortex where some areas have specialised functions, for instance area V5 is involved in the modelling of motion and V4 in adding colour. The resulting single image that subjects report as their experience is called a 'percept'. Studies involving rapidly changing scenes show the percept derives from numerous processes that involve time delays. Recent fMRI studies show that dreams, imaginings and perceptions of things such as faces are accompanied by activity in many of the same areas of brain as are involved with physical sight. Imagery that originates from the senses and internally generated imagery may have a shared ontology at higher levels of cortical processing.

Sound is analyzed in term of pressure waves sensed by the cochlea in the ear. Data from the eyes and ears is combined to form a 'bound' percept. The problem of how this is produced, known as the binding problem.

Perception is analyzed as a cognitive process in which information processing is used to transfer information into the mind where it is related to other information. Some psychologists propose that this processing gives rise to particular mental states (cognitivism) whilst others envisage a direct path back into the external world in the form of action (radical behaviourism). Behaviourists such as John B. Watson and B.F. Skinner have proposed that perception acts largely as a process between a stimulus and a response but have noted that Gilbert Ryle's "ghost in the machine of the brain" still seems to exist. "The objection to inner states is not that they do not exist, but that they are not relevant in a functional analysis". This view, in which experience is thought to be an incidental by-product of information processing, is known as epiphenomenalism.

Contrary to the behaviouralist approach to understanding the elements of cognitive processes, gestalt psychology sought to understand their organization as a whole, studying perception as a process of figure and ground.

== Problem of Perception ==
Important philosophical problems derive from the epistemology of perception—how we can gain knowledge via perception—such as the question of the nature of conscious experience. Within the biological study of perception naive realism is unusable. However, outside biology modified forms of naive realism are defended. Thomas Reid, the eighteenth-century founder of the Scottish School of Common Sense, formulated the idea that sensation was composed of a set of data transfers but also declared that there is still a direct connection between perception and the world. This idea, called direct realism, has again become popular in recent years with the rise of postmodernism.

The succession of data transfers involved in perception suggests that sense data are somehow available to a perceiving subject that is the substrate of the percept. Indirect realism, the view held by John Locke and Nicolas Malebranche, proposes that we can only be aware of mental representations of objects. However, this may imply an infinite regress (a perceiver within a perceiver within a perceiver...), though a finite regress is perfectly possible. It also assumes that perception is entirely due to data transfer and information processing, an argument that can be avoided by proposing that the percept does not depend wholly upon the transfer and rearrangement of data. This still involves basic ontological issues of the sort raised by Leibniz, Locke, Hume, Whitehead and others, which remain outstanding particularly in relation to the binding problem, the question of how different perceptions (e.g. color and contour in vision) are "bound" to the same object when they are processed by separate areas of the brain.

Indirect realism (representational views) provides an account of issues such as perceptual contents, qualia, dreams, imaginings, hallucinations, illusions, the resolution of binocular rivalry, the resolution of multistable perception, the modelling of motion that allows us to watch TV, the sensations that result from direct brain stimulation, the update of the mental image by saccades of the eyes and the referral of events backwards in time. Direct realists must either argue that these experiences do not occur or else refuse to define them as perceptions.

Idealism holds that reality is limited to mental qualities while skepticism challenges our ability to know anything outside our minds. One of the most influential proponents of idealism was George Berkeley who maintained that everything was mind or dependent upon mind. Berkeley's idealism has two main strands, phenomenalism in which physical events are viewed as a special kind of mental event and subjective idealism. David Hume is probably the most influential proponent of skepticism.

A fourth theory of perception in opposition to naive realism, enactivism, attempts to find a middle path between direct realist and indirect realist theories, positing that cognition is a process of dynamic interplay between an organism's sensory-motor capabilities and the environment it brings forth. Instead of seeing perception as a passive process determined entirely by the features of an independently existing world, enactivism suggests that organism and environment are structurally coupled and co-determining. The theory was first formalized by Francisco Varela, Evan Thompson, and Eleanor Rosch in "The Embodied Mind".

== Spatial representation ==
An aspect of perception that is common to both realists and anti-realists is the idea of mental or perceptual space. David Hume concluded that things appear extended because they have attributes of colour and solidity. A popular modern philosophical view is that the brain cannot contain images so our sense of space must be due to the actual space occupied by physical things. However, as René Descartes noticed, perceptual space has a projective geometry, things within it appear as if they are viewed from a point. The phenomenon of perspective was closely studied by artists and architects in the Renaissance, who relied mainly on the 11th century polymath, Alhazen (Ibn al-Haytham), who affirmed the visibility of perceptual space in geometric structuring projections. Mathematicians now know of many types of projective geometry such as complex Minkowski space that might describe the layout of things in perception (see Peters (2000)) and it has also emerged that parts of the brain contain patterns of electrical activity that correspond closely to the layout of the retinal image (this is known as retinotopy). How or whether these become conscious experience is still unknown (see McGinn (1995)).

== Beyond spatial representation ==
Traditionally, the philosophical investigation of perception has focused on the sense of vision as the paradigm of sensory perception. However, studies on the other sensory modalities, such as the sense of smell, can challenge what we consider characteristic or essential features of perception. Take olfaction as an example. Spatial representation relies on a "mapping" paradigm that maps the spatial structures of the stimuli onto discrete neural structures and representations. However, olfactory science has shown us that perception is also a matter of associative learning, observational refinement, and a decision-making process that is context-dependent. One of the consequences of these discoveries on the philosophy of perception is that common perceptual effects such as conceptual imagery turn more on the neural architecture and its development than the topology of the stimulus itself.

== See also ==
- Anil Gupta
- Argument from illusion
- Arthur Schopenhauer
- Āyatana
- Binding problem
- Charles Sanders Peirce
- Consciousness
- Direct realism
- Epistemology
- Fiona Macpherson
- George Berkeley
- Hallucinations in the sane
- Idealism
- Immanuel Kant
- Indirect realism
- John McDowell
- Map-territory relation
- Maurice Merleau-Ponty
- Mind's eye
- Multistable perception
- Open individualism
- Perceptual conceptualism
- Philosophical realism
- Philosophy of mind
- Qualia
- Roderick Chisholm
- Sensorium
- Solipsism
- Subjective character of experience
- Susanna Schellenberg
- Susanna Siegel
- Theories of perception
- Thomas Reid
- Transcendental idealism
- Vertiginous question
- Visual perception
- Visual space
- Wilfrid Sellars
