= Professor of Moral Philosophy (Glasgow) =

The Chair of Moral Philosophy is a professorship at the University of Glasgow, Scotland, which was established in 1727.

The Nova Erectio of King James VI of Scotland shared the teaching of Moral Philosophy, Logic and Natural Philosophy among the Regents. In 1727 separate chairs were instituted.

== Professors of Moral Philosophy ==
- Gershom Carmichael MA (1727)
- Francis Hutcheson MA LLD (1729)
- Thomas Craigie MA (1746)
- Adam Smith MA LLD (1752)
- Thomas Reid MA DD (1764)
- Archibald Arthur MA (1796)
- James Mylne MA (1797)
- William Fleming MA DD (1839)
- Edward Caird MA DCL LLD (1866)
- Sir Henry Jones CH MA LLD LittD FBA
- Alexander Dunlop Lindsay CBE MA (1922)
- Sir Hector Hetherington GBE DL MA LLD DLitt D-es-L (1924)
- Archibald Allan Bowman MA LittD (1927)
- Sir Oliver Shewell Franks GCMG KCB CBE MA LLD (1936)
- William Gauld Maclagan MA PhD (1946)
- Robert Silcock Downie MA BPhil FRSE (1969–2000)
- Alan Brian Carter BA MA DPhil (2005–2011)
- Glen Pettigrove (2017–present)

== See also ==
- List of Professorships at the University of Glasgow
