= Thomas Reid's tombstone =

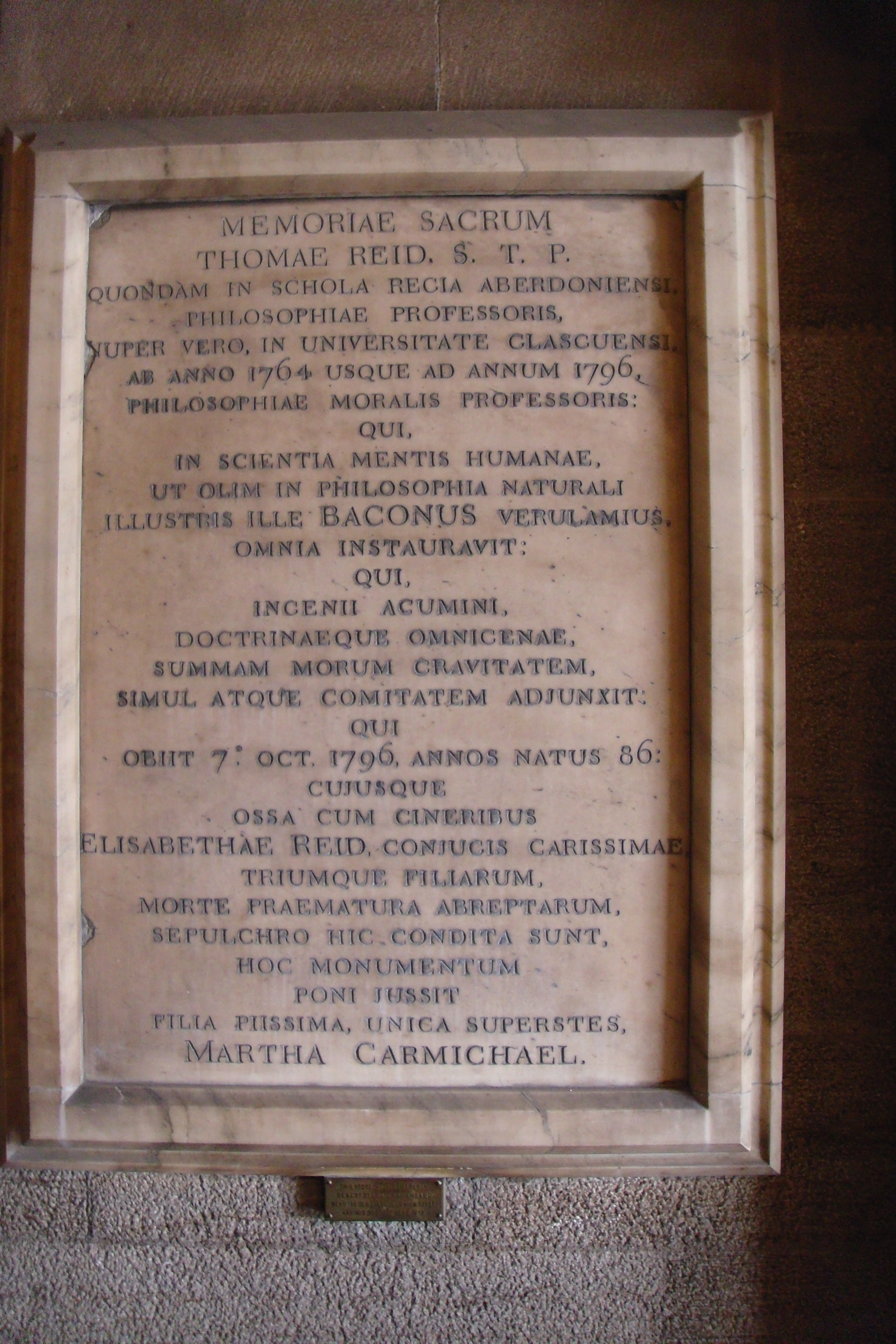
Thomas Reid's tombstone at the entrance of the Gilbert Scott Building of Glasgow University

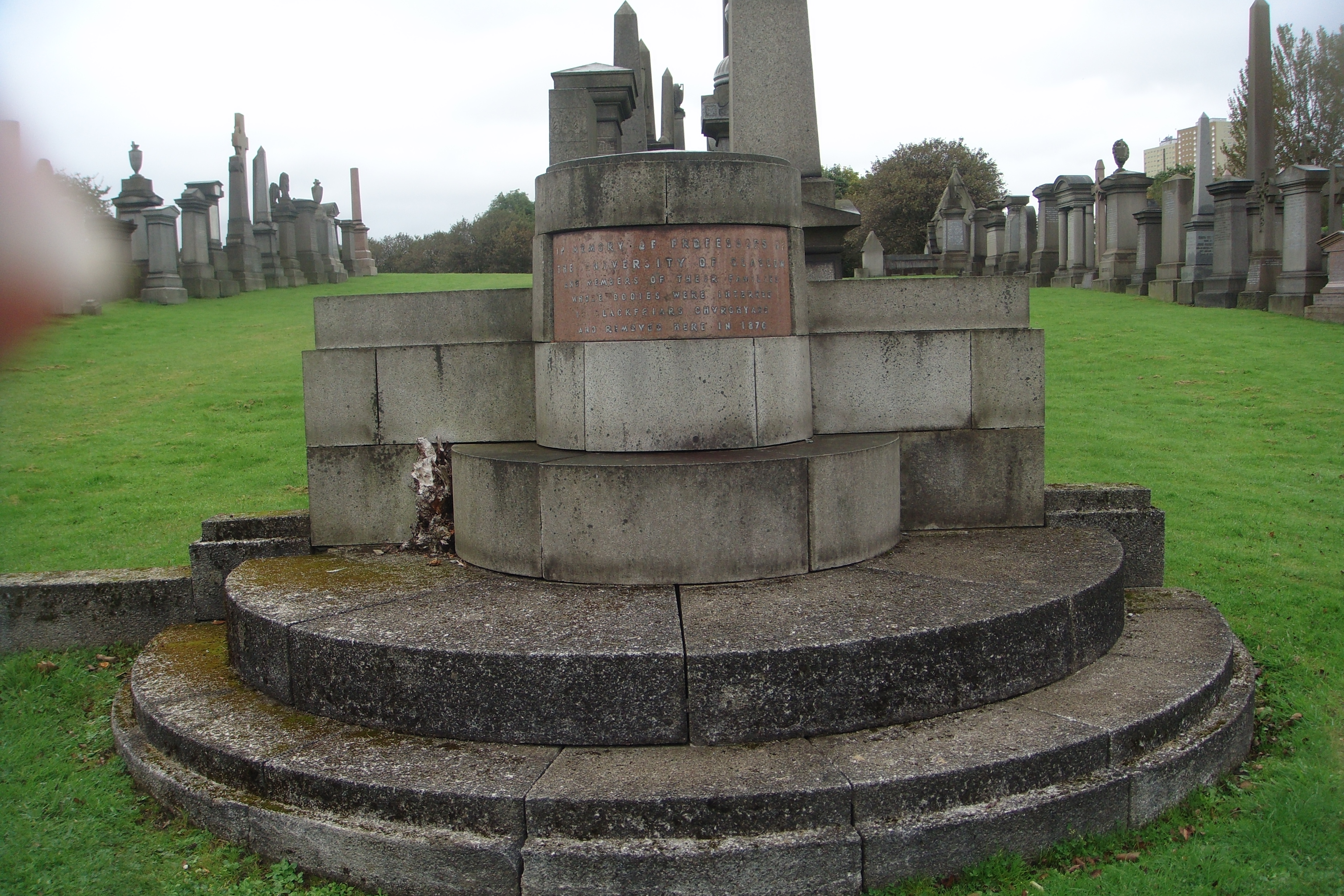
The Professors' Monument in Glasgow Necropolis where Reid's remains were placed.

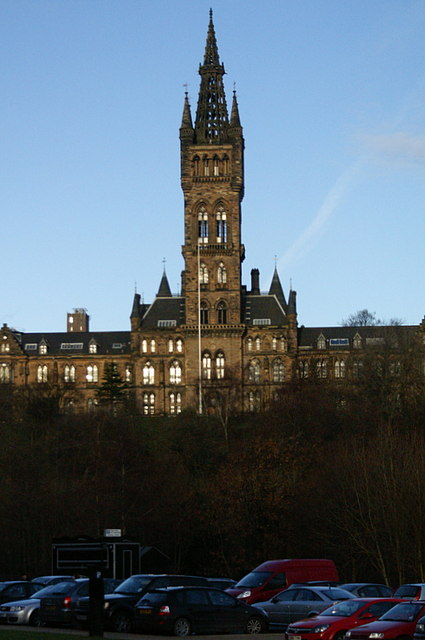
Glasgow University Tower The tombstone is on the right hand side of the entrance to the tower

Thomas Reid D.D. (1710–1796) was Professor of Moral Philosophy at the University of Glasgow and founder of the Scottish common sense movement in philosophy. Remarkably, his tombstone is to be found in the vestibule of the main building of Glasgow University and directly under the 85m (278 feet) high tower of the Gilbert Scott Building. Reid’s remains were originally laid in Blackfriars Church burial-ground, on the grounds of Glasgow College in the High Street, Glasgow. The tombstone was removed when the College moved to Gilmorehill in 1870. It was placed in its present position when the building of the Tower above it was begun, thus forming a fitting ‘monument’ to Reid. In comparison, the Scott Monument in Edinburgh is only 200.5 feet (61.1 m).

== Inscriptions ==
Tombstone inscription may be translated as follows:

Sacred to the memory of Thomas Reid, S.T.P., formerly Professor of Philosophy at King’s College, Aberdeen; more recently Professor of Moral Philosophy in the University of Glasgow, from the year 1764 to the year 1796; who renewed everything in the science of the human mind, as once the distinguished Lord Bacon of St. Albans did in natural philosophy; who combined sharpness of mind, all kinds of learning, utmost seriousness of character, and likewise kindness; who died 7th October, 1796, at the age of 86, and whose bones together with the ashes of Elizabeth Reid, his much loved wife, and three daughters carried off by premature death, are buried here in this tomb. The erection of this monument was ordered by his most affectionate, and only surviving daughter, Martha Carmichael.

The full Latin inscription is as follows:

Memoriae sacrum THOMAE REID, S.T.P., quondam in Schola Regia Aberdonensi Philosophiae Professoris; nuper vero, in Universitate Glasguensi, ab anno 1764 usque ad annum 1796, Phi1osophiae Moralis Professoris; qui in Scientia Mentis Humanae, ut olim in Philosophia Naturali illustris ille Baconus Verulamius, omnia instauravit; qui ingenii acumini, doctrinaeque omnigenae, summam morum gravitatem, simul atque comitatem, adjunxit; qui obiit 7th October, 1796, annos natus 86. Cujusque ossa cum cineribus ELIZABETHAE REID, conjugis carissimae, triumque filiarum, morte praematura abreptarum, sepulchro hic condita sunt, hoc Monumentum poni jussit filia piissima, unica superstes, Martha Carmichael."

== Relocation ==
When the Glasgow College buildings in the High Street were demolished, Reid’s remains were placed with those of other professors and their families in the Professors’ Monument in the Glasgow Necropolis near Glasgow Cathedral. The Monument is at the south end of the sixth row of monuments from the eastern end of the cemetery, and overlooking Reid’s home in Drygate. It has the following inscription: "In memory of Professors of the University of Glasgow and members of their family whose bodies were interred in Blackfriars Churchyard and removed here in 1876."
