= Archibald Arthur =

Scottish philosopher (1744–1797)

- Born: 6 September 1744
- Died: 14 June 1797 (aged 52)

Education
- Education: University of Glasgow

Philosophical work
- Era: Scottish Enlightenment
- Region: Scotland

Archibald Arthur FRSE (6 September 1744 – 14 June 1797) was a Scottish Enlightenment philosopher. An alumnus of the University of Glasgow, he served as University chaplain from 1774 – 1794, and librarian from 1780 - 1794. Between 1780 and 1794 he worked as an assistant to Professor of Moral Philosophy Thomas Reid, taking on the latter's teaching duties, and succeeding him in 1796.

== Biography ==
He was the eldest son of Andrew Arthur, a considerable farmer, and was born at Abbot's Inch, in Renfrewshire 6 September 1744. He entered the University of Glasgow in his thirteenth or fourteenth year, and in due course took his degree of M.A. Both before and after his appointment to a professorship he lectured with success in logic, botany, humanity, and church history. In October 1767, he received from the presbytery of Paisley his preacher's license, not, however, without some opposition on the ground of want of orthodoxy in the doctrines of the Church of Scotland. He was soon afterwards appointed chaplain to the University of Glasgow, and assistant minister with Dr. Craig of that city. He was also chosen librarian to the university, and held the office until nearly the close of his life.

For some years he was usefully employed in compiling a complete catalogue of the books, arranged in two parts, one under an alphabet of authors, and the other according to the position of the volumes on the shelves. The catalogue was printed in 1791, and described 20,000 volumes. It gave much satisfaction. Arthur was appointed assistant professor in moral philosophy through the influence of Dr. Thomas Reid, who was obliged to give up his full professorial duties on account of increasing years. This took place in May 1780, and Arthur taught the class for fifteen years in return for part of the salary. On the death of Reid, he was elected full professor, but held the office only for one session, dying on 14 June 1797. He never married, and died worth a considerable sum of money, which he left to his brothers and sisters. They devoted part of it to the publication of his posthumous "Discourses on Theological and Literary Subjects", which were edited, with a memoir by his friend William Richardson. The theological discourses include one on the argument for the existence of God, another on the goodness of God, and others on objections to David Hume, and similar topics; among the literary discourses are two upon theories of beauty, one on the arrangement of ancient and modern languages, and others on the study of ancient languages as a necessary branch of liberal education. Arthur had a shy and hesitating manner, but possessed liberal opinions to which he always had the courage to hold firm. A. F. Tytler, in a note upon a letter of Dr. Reid, remarks: "Mr. Arthur, a man of learning, abilities, and worth, filled the chair of moral philosophy … with a reputation which did not disappoint the hopes of his respectable predecessor". The Discourses "give a very favourable idea of his talents, the justness of his taste, and the rectitude of his moral and religious principles".

== Works ==
His works are:

- Catalogus impressorum Librorum in Bibliotheca Universitatis Glasguensis, secundum literarum ordinem dispositus. Impensis Academiæ, labore et studio A. Arthur, Glasguæ, 1791, 2 vols, folio.,
- Discourses on Theological and Literary Subjects, by the late Rev. A. Arthur, with an account of some particulars in his life and character, by William Richardson, M.A., Professor of Humanity in the University of Glasgow, Glasgow Univ. Press, 1803, 8vo.
