= Gershom Carmichael =

Scottish philosopher (1672–1729)

Education
- Education: Edinburgh University

Philosophical work
- School: Scottish school of philosophy
- Notable works: Breviuscula Introductio ad Logicam; Synopsis Theologiae Naturalis

Gershom Carmichael (1672–1729) was a Scottish philosopher.

Gershom Carmichael was a Scottish subject born in London, the son of Alexander Charmichael, a Church of Scotland minister who had been banished by the Scottish privy council for his religious opinions. As a child, he suffered from crooked limbs (probably rickets) and was treated by "body menders" who made him wear limb braces. Through his friendship with the Duke of Hamilton, Carmichael visited Bath to take the waters and he was eventually able to dispense with the braces.

Carmichael graduated at Edinburgh University in 1691, and became a regent at St Andrews. In 1694 he was elected a master in the university of Glasgow – an office that was converted into the professorship of moral philosophy in 1727, when the system of masters was abolished at Glasgow. He died in Glasgow.

Sir William Hamilton regarded him as "the real founder of the Scottish school of philosophy". He wrote Breviuscula Introductio ad Logicam, a treatise on logic and the psychology of the intellectual powers, combining Arnauld and Nicole with Locke; Synopsis Theologiae Naturalis; and an edition of Pufendorf, De Officio Hominis et Civis, with notes and supplements of high value. His son Frederick was the author of Sermons on Several Important Subjects and Sermons on Christian Zeal, both published in 1753.
