= Naïve realism =

Idea that the senses provide us with direct awareness of objects as they really are

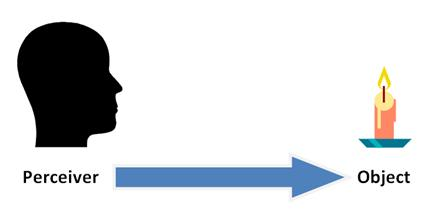
Naïve realism argues we perceive the world directly

In philosophy of perception and epistemology, naïve realism (often associated with direct (perceptual) realism, itself metaphysically complemented by manifest realism) is the idea that the senses provide us with direct awareness of objects as they really are. When referred to as direct realism, naïve realism is often contrasted with indirect realism.

According to the naïve realist, the objects of perception are not representations of external objects, but are in fact those external objects themselves. The naïve realist is typically also a metaphysical realist, holding that these objects continue to obey the laws of physics and retain all of their properties regardless of whether or not there is anyone to observe them. They are composed of matter, occupy space, and have properties, such as size, shape, texture, smell, taste and colour, that are usually perceived correctly. The indirect realist, by contrast, holds that the objects of perception are simply representations of reality based on sensory inputs, and thus adheres to the primary/secondary quality distinction in ascribing properties to external objects.

In addition to indirect realism, naïve realism can also be contrasted with some forms of idealism, which claim that no world exists apart from mind-dependent ideas, and some forms of philosophical skepticism, which say that we cannot trust our senses or prove that we are not radically deceived in our beliefs; that our conscious experience is not of the real world but of an internal representation of the world.

== Overview ==
The naïve realist is generally committed to the following views:

- Metaphysical realism: There exists a world of material objects, which exist independently of being perceived, and which have properties such as shape, size, color, mass, and so on independently of being perceived
- Empiricism: Some statements about these objects can be known to be true through sensory experience
- Naïve realism: By means of our senses, we perceive the world directly, and pretty much as it is, meaning that our claims to have knowledge of it are justified

Among contemporary analytic philosophers who defended direct realism one might refer to, for example, H. A. Prichard, Hilary Putnam, John McDowell, Michael R. Ayers, Galen Strawson, John R. Searle, and John L. Pollock.

Searle, for instance, disputes the popular assumption that "we can only directly perceive our own subjective experiences, but never objects and states of affairs in the world themselves". According to Searle, it has influenced many thinkers to reject direct realism. But Searle contends that the rejection of direct realism is based on a bad argument: the argument from illusion, which in turn relies on vague assumptions on the nature or existence of "sense data". Various sense data theories were deconstructed in 1962 by the British philosopher J. L. Austin in a book titled Sense and Sensibilia.

Talk of sense data has largely been replaced today by talk of representational perception in a broader sense, and scientific realists typically take perception to be representational and therefore assume that indirect realism is true. But the assumption is philosophical, and arguably little prevents scientific realists from assuming direct realism to be true. In a blog post on "Naive realism and color realism", Hilary Putnam sums up with the following words: "Being an apple is not a natural kind in physics, but it is in biology, recall. Being complex and of no interest to fundamental physics isn't a failure to be "real". I think green is as real as applehood."

The direct realist claims that the experience of a sunset, for instance, is the real sunset that we directly experience. The indirect realist claims that our relation to reality is indirect, so the experience of a sunset is a subjective representation of what really is radiation as described by physics. But the direct realist does not deny that the sunset is radiation; the experience has a hierarchical structure, and the radiation is part of what amounts to the direct experience.

Simon Blackburn has argued that whatever positions they may take in books, articles or lectures, naive realism is the view of "philosophers when they are off-duty."

== History ==
For a history of direct realist theories, see Direct and indirect realism § History.

== Scientific realism and naïve perceptual realism ==
Many philosophers claim that it is incompatible to accept naïve realism in the philosophy of perception and scientific realism in the philosophy of science. Scientific realism states that the universe contains just those properties that feature in a scientific description of it, which would mean that secondary qualities like color are not real per se, and that all that exists are certain wavelengths which are reflected by physical objects because of their microscopic surface texture.

John Locke notably held that the world only contains the primary qualities that feature in a corpuscularian scientific account of the world, and that secondary qualities are in some sense subjective and depend for their existence upon the presence of some perceiver who can observe the objects.

== Influence in psychology ==
Naïve realism in philosophy has also inspired work on visual perception in psychology. The leading direct realist theorist in psychology was J. J. Gibson. Other psychologists were heavily influenced by this approach, including William Mace, Claire Michaels, Edward S. Reed, Robert Shaw, and Michael Turvey. More recently, Carol Fowler has promoted a direct realist approach to speech perception.

== See also ==
- Common sense realism
- Critical perceptual realism
- Disjunctivism
- Empirical realism
- Naïve physics
- New realism
- Qualia
- Phenomenology (psychology) and Phenomenology (philosophy)
- Plato's allegory of the cave
