= Argument from illusion =

Critique of direct realism in perception

The argument from illusion is an argument for the existence of sense-data. It is posed as a criticism of direct realism.

== Overview ==
Naturally occurring illusions best illustrate the argument's points, a notable example concerning a stick: I have a stick, which appears to me to be straight, but when I hold it underwater it seems to bend and distort. I know that the stick is straight and that its apparent flexibility is a result of its being seen through the water, yet I cannot change the mental image I have of the stick as being bent. Since the stick is not in fact bent its appearance can be described as an illusion. Rather than directly perceiving the stick, which would entail our seeing it as it truly is, we must instead perceive it indirectly, by way of an image or "sense-datum". This mental representation does not tell us anything about the stick's true properties, which remain inaccessible to us.

With this being the case, however, there is no certainty of the stick's initial straightness. If all we perceive is sense-data then the stick's apparent initial straightness is just as likely to be false as its half-submerged bent appearance. Therefore, the argument runs, we can never gain any knowledge about the stick, as we only ever perceive a sense-datum, and not the stick itself. This argument was defended by A. J. Ayer.

== Criticism of the argument ==
A critical argument would be as follows: Because the stick provides a contrasting surface in the surrounding water, the bent appearance of the stick is evidence of the previously unaccounted for physical properties of the water. It would be a mistake to categorize an optical effect resulting from a physical cause as sensory fallibility because it results from an increase in information from another previously unaccounted-for object or physical property. Unless the water is not taken into consideration, the example in fact reinforces the reliability of our visual sense to gather information accurately. This criticism, which was most strongly voiced by J.L. Austin, is that perceptual variation which can be attributed to physical causes does not entail a representational disconnect between sense and reference, owing to an unreasonable segregation of parts from the perceived object.

Further arguments are based on the extended mind theory, which appeals to external sources of mental items. For example, the theory holds that perception is the result of a complex interaction of mind, body and the environment. This would rule out internal items such as sense data as referred to in the statement of the argument.

== Bibliography ==
- Austin, J. L. Sense and Sensibilia, ed. G. J. Warnock. Oxford: Oxford University Press, 1962.
- Ayer, A.J. The Foundations of Empirical Knowledge. New York: Macmillan, 1940.
- Moore, G.E. "Sense-Data" in Some Main Problems of Philosophy. London: Allen Unwin, 1953.
- Putnam, Hilary. The Threefold Cord: Mind, Body, and World. New York: Columbia University Press, 1999.
- Russell, Bertrand. "Appearance and Reality" in The Problems of Philosophy. New York: Hackett, n.d.
