= Edward S. Reed =

American philosopher of science (1954–1997)

Edward Steven Reed (November 20, 1954 – February 14, 1997) was an American philosopher of science and an ecological psychologist in the vein of James J. Gibson.

Reed was born in New York, New York. He died in Mohnton, Pennsylvania.

== Partial bibliography ==
- Reed, E.S. & Jones, R. (Eds.). (1982). Reasons for Realism: Selected essays of James J. Gibson. Hillsdale, NJ: Lawrence Erlbaum.
- Reed, E.S. (1986). James Gibson's ecological revolution in perceptual psychology: A case study in the transformation of scientific Ideas. Studies in the History and Philosophy of Science, 17, 65–99.
- Reed, E.S. (1987). James Gibson's Ecological Approach to Cognition (pp. 142–173). In A. Costall & A. Still (Eds.). Cognitive Psychology in Question. Sussex: Harvester Press.
- Reed, E.S. (1988a). James J. Gibson and the psychology of perception. New Haven: Yale University Press.
- Reed, E.S. (1988b). Why Do Things Look as they do? The Implications of J.J. Gibson's The Ecological Approach to Visual perception (pp. 90–114). In G. Claxton (Ed.). Growth Points in Cognition. London: Routledge.
- Reed, E.S. (1990). The trapped infinity: Cartesian volition as conceptual nightmare. Philosophical Psychology, 3, 101–121.
- Reed, E.S. (1993). The intention to use a specific affordance: A conceptual framework for psychology (pp. 45–76). In R. Wozniak & K. Fischer (Eds.). Development in Context: Activity and Thinking in Specific Environments. Hillsdale, NJ: LEA.
- Reed, E.S. (1996a). Encountering the World: Toward an Ecological Psychology. New York: Oxford University Press.
- Reed, E.S. (1996b). James J. Gibson: Pioneer and iconoclast (pp. 247–261). In G. Kimble, C. Boneau, & M. Wertheimer. (Eds.), Portraits of pioneers in psychology (Vol. 2) Hillsdale, NJ: APA & Erlbaum.
- Reed, E.S. (1997). From Soul to Mind: The Emergence of Psychology from Erasmus Darwin to William James. New Haven, CT/London: Yale University Press. Reviewed in Library Journal 1997-06-01 (accessible online).
