= Scottish common sense realism =

Realist school of philosophy

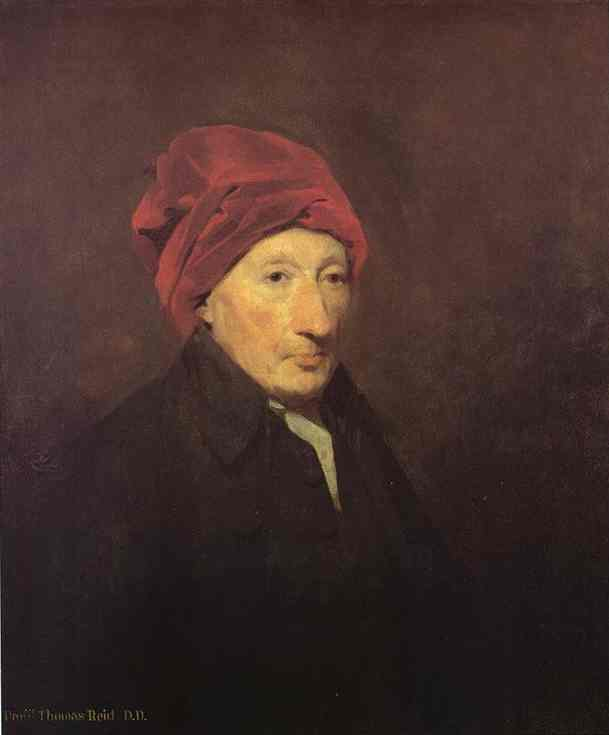
Thomas Reid

Scottish common sense realism, also known as the Scottish school of common sense, is a realist school of philosophy that originated in the ideas of Scottish philosophers Thomas Reid, Adam Ferguson, James Beattie, and Dugald Stewart during the 18th-century Scottish Enlightenment. Reid emphasized man's innate ability to perceive common ideas and that this process is inherent in and interdependent with judgement. Common sense, therefore, is the foundation of philosophical inquiry. Though best remembered for its opposition to the pervasive philosophy of David Hume, Scottish common sense philosophy was influential in late 18th-century America.

== History ==
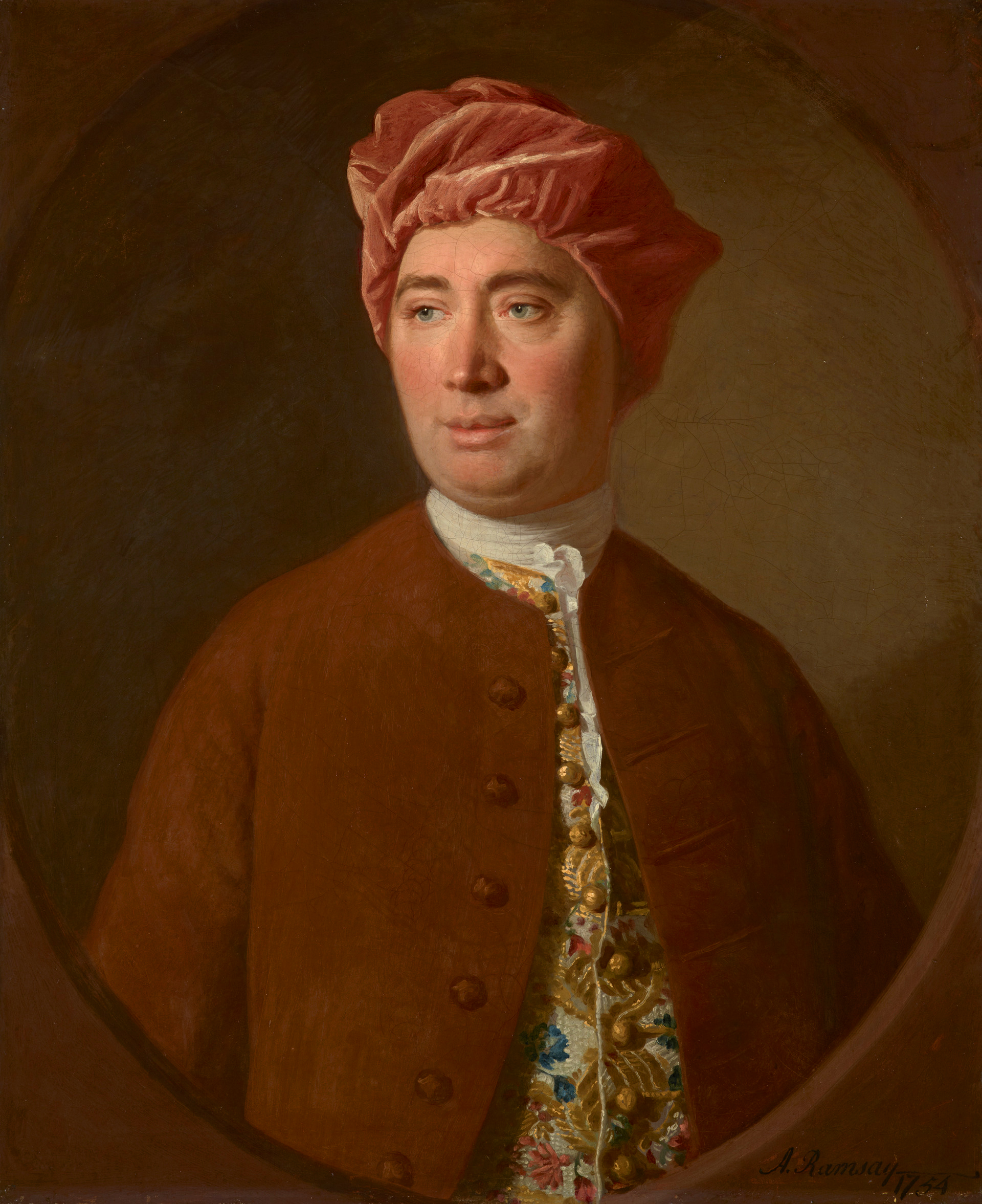
David Hume

The Scottish School of Common Sense was an epistemological philosophy that flourished in Scotland in the late 18th and early 19th centuries. Its roots can be found in responses to the writings of such philosophers as John Locke, George Berkeley and David Hume, and its most prominent members were Dugald Stewart, Thomas Reid, William Hamilton and, as has recently been argued, Thomas Carlyle. Philosophically, Scottish Realism served as a rebuttal to scepticism while keeping with the influential teachings of Isaac Newton and Francis Bacon. While largely understated for many years, the influence it had on philosophers elsewhere in Europe, not to mention in the United States, is of a considerable magnitude.

One central concern of the school was to defend "common sense" against philosophical paradox and scepticism. It argued that common-sense beliefs govern the lives and thoughts even of those who avow non-commonsensical beliefs and that matters of common sense are inherent to the acquisition of knowledge. The qualities of its works were not generally consistent; Edward S. Reed writes, e.g., "[Whereas] Thomas Reid wished to use common sense to develop philosophical wisdom, much of this school simply wanted to use common sense to attack any form of intellectual change."

== Teachings ==
The Scottish School of Common Sense was founded by Reid in opposition to Descartes's Theory of Ideas. But the epistemology of sense experience led John Locke and David Hume to a skeptical philosophy that realists found absurd and contrary to common experience. Thus Hume and his sceptical argument would serve as the primary foil to the development of Reid's philosophy. Under the tutelage of George Turnbull, Reid embraced the tenets of Providential Naturalism and its four interconnected tenets; using these as the basis for his refutation of the theory of ideas. Reid painstakingly developed his treatise An Inquiry into the Human Mind on the Principles of Common Sense over the course of 40 years, often seeking the input of his contemporary philosophers within the Scottish Enlightenment including Hume.

Reid articulated the basic principle of Common Sense Realism:

"If there are certain principles, as I think there are, which the constitution of our nature leads us to believe, and which we are under a necessity to take for granted in the common concerns of life, without being able to give a reason for them — these are what we call the principles of common sense; and what is manifestly contrary to them, is what we call absurd."

Scottish Common Sense Realism is rooted in Aristotelian thought and advocates an empirical and scientific philosophy wherein trust of our senses is implicit and necessary. The principles of common sense are fundamental to our accumulation of knowledge of both metaphysical and physical constructs. However, observation alone cannot account for all knowledge, and truth can be garnered by reflection. In Reid's own words:

"I can likewise conceive an individual object that really exists, such as St. Paul's Church in London. I have an idea of it; I conceive it. The immediate object of this conception is 400 miles distant; and I have no reason to think it acts upon me or that I act on it."

Essential to first principles, faculties, or mental powers, perform the act of perception and conception (Leher 784). The intellectual faculties support a wide variety of mental events. Acts of conceiving are set in many of them (Nichols and Yaffe). Examples of conception include judging there is a door in front of me, imagining there is a door in front of me, or reasoning that all doors have handles (Nichols and Yaffe). "Faculties are all fallible" as there is evidence of our faculties and senses but not of objects we conceive (Leher 785). But, "we trust them whether we choose to or not" since they always prevail in daily life (Leher 786). All Reid's philosophy depends on not fallacious faculties. Senses are an extension of the faculties; they produce conceptions qualities (like how a smell suggests the existence of an object) and ground our beliefs (Nichols and Yaffe 45). Freedom is another natural conviction from faculties, which is preloaded and irresistible as first principles prove. Faculties are "the foundation of true philosophy, science, and practical life, and without them we shall lead ourselves into the coalpit of skepticism and despair." (Leher 787).

The school taught that every person had ordinary experiences that provided intuitively certain assurance of a) the existence of the self, b) the existence of real objects that could be seen and felt; and c) certain "first principles" upon which sound morality and religious beliefs could be established. These principles laid the foundation for Reid's influential theory of perception.

In practice, philosophers of the Scottish school offered scientific explanations to historical events and advocated an unprejudiced and inter-disciplinary approach to education, free from religious and patriotic biases.

=== Theories of perception ===
Thomas Reid and Dugald Stewart offered related theories of perception rooted in Scottish Common Sense Realism. According to Nicholas Wolterstorff of Yale University, Reid's philosophy can be non-contentiously reduced to four basic precepts:

"(1) The objects of acts of perception are external objects. That is, mind-independent spatially-located entities;
(2) The necessary and sufficient condition for perceiving an external object is that the object cause in one a conception thereof and an immediate (non-inferential) belief about it;
(3) We human beings are so made that, in perception, the external object causes a conception of, and an immediate belief about, itself, by way of causing a sensation which in turn causes ('suggests') the conception and immediate belief;
(4) The sensation may cause, and often does in fact cause, the conception and belief without one's being sufficiently attentive to the sensation for a belief about it to be formed in one."

Dugald Stewart's theory of perception acknowledges a great influence from Reid whose philosophy he termed "fundamental laws of belief". However, Stewart proffered a more moderate approach to realism and his theory of perception emphasized the utility of the senses.

== Influence ==
Common Sense Realism not only influenced Scottish thought in the 19th century, it had a major influence as well in France, the United States, and other countries. Victor Cousin (1792–1867) was the most important proponent in France. Reidian thought was the "orthodox philosophy of colleges and universities" in the early 18th century and provided an intellectual bedrock for the Age of Enlightenment.

=== American Declaration of Independence ===
Declaration of Independence, a painting by John Trumbull depicting the Committee of Five presenting their draft of the Declaration of Independence to the Congress on 28 June 1776. Trumbull's painting appears on the reverse of the United States two-dollar bill.

Common Sense Realism swept American intellectual circles in the 18th century. Reid's philosophy was pervasive during the American Revolution and served as a stabilizing philosophical influence. Hailed by some as the "father of modern psychiatry", Benjamin Rush's tutelage at the University of Edinburgh imbued him with strong realist tendencies which influenced much of his scientific and political work including his moral opposition to slavery. Evidence of the influence of Scottish Common Sense realism can readily be found in the philosophy of both Thomas Jefferson and John Adams. Adams compared the contributions of Dugald Stewart favorably to works of Aristotle and René Descartes. Scotsman and signer of the Declaration of Independence, John Witherspoon presided over Princeton University; students under his tutelage included 12 state governors, 55 delegates to the Constitutional Convention and future president James Madison. His education at the University of Edinburgh made him a strong proponent of the Scottish Enlightenment and Realism. James McCosh (1811–94) continued the influence of Scottish Realism at Princeton when he became president of the university in 1868, reviving its influence as a major stronghold of the movement. Noah Porter (1811–92) taught Common Sense realism to generations of students at Yale.

=== Christian fundamentalism ===
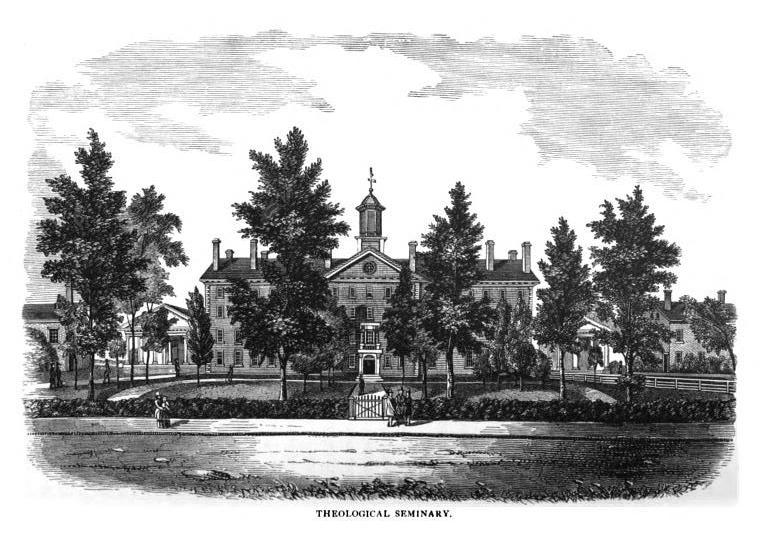
Princeton Seminary in the 1800s

Scottish Realism greatly influenced conservative religious thought and was strongest at Princeton Seminary until the Seminary moved in new directions after 1929. The Princeton theologians built their elaborate system on the basis of "common-sense" realism, biblicism and confessionalism. James McCosh was brought from Queen's College, Belfast, to Princeton College's Chair of Moral Philosophy and Presidency because of his book "The Method of Divine Government", a Christian philosophy that was precursory to Charles Darwin's "The Origin of Species" (1859). Several Princeton Theologians followed McCosh to adopt a stance of theistic evolution. It was his goal to develop Princeton as a Christian university in North America, as well as a forefront intellectual seminary of the Presbyterian Church. The faculty of the college and seminary included both evolutionary thinkers and non-evolutionary thinkers. Much evangelical theology of the 21st century is based on Princeton theology and thus reflects Common Sense Realism. New Testament scholar Grant R. Osborne concludes that Scottish Common Sense Realism influenced biblical hermeneutics, that the surface level understanding of Scripture became popular, and individualistic interpretations abounded.

== See also ==
- Adam Smith
- Direct realism
- Francis Hutcheson (philosopher)
- History of philosophy in Poland §§ Enlightenment and Messianism
- James Frederick Ferrier
- Naive realism
- Scottish philosophy
- Thomas Brown (philosopher)
