= Caroline Scott =

Caroline Scott may refer to:

- Caroline Lucy Scott (1784–1857), English novelist
- Caroline Scott (First Lady) (1832–1892), First Lady of the United States
- Caroline Frederick Scott (died 1754), Scottish soldier of the British Army
- Caroline Scott, beauty pageant contestant and 2015 winner of Miss Wyoming USA
- Caroline Scott, a member of the pop group Slumber Party Girls

== See also ==
- Carolyn Scott, American art director and set decorator
