= George Lewis Scott =

Scottish mathematician & musician (1708-1780)

George Lewis Scott, FRS
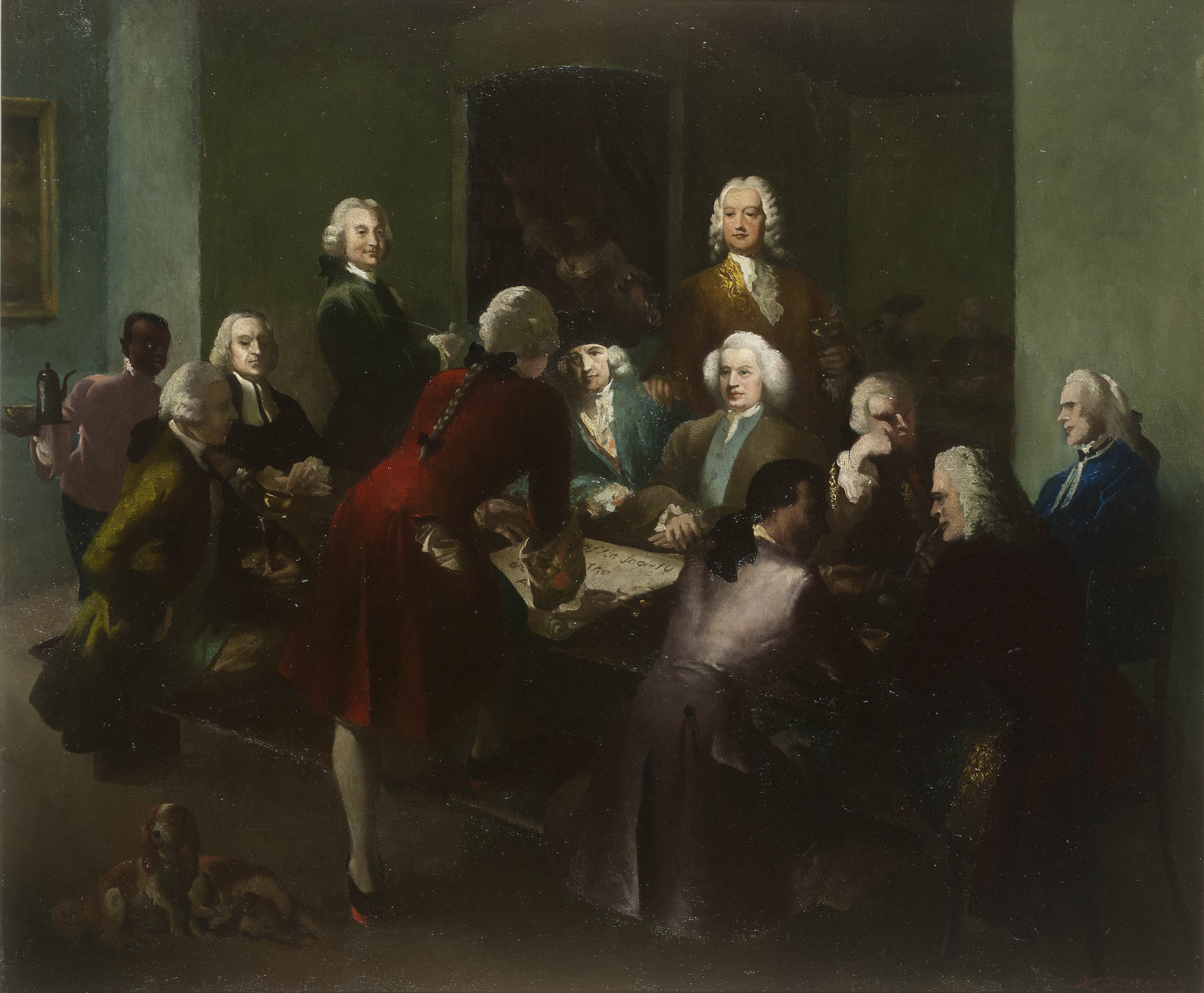
- Royal Society Meeting; Scott was made a member in 1737
- Born: 1 May 1708; Hanover
- Died: 7 December 1780 (aged 72); London, England
- Education: Leiden University
- Occupations: Mathematician, musician
- Spouse: Sarah Scott 1751-1752 (separated)
- Writing career
- Language: English

George Lewis Scott (1708–1780) was a mathematician and literary figure who was tutor to the future George III from 1751 to 1755. A friend of the historian Edward Gibbon, the poet James Thomson and other members of the Georgian era literary world, he was described as 'perhaps the most accomplished of all amateur mathematicians who never gave their works to the world'.

He was married for a short time to the writer Sarah Scott but they separated after less than a year. His younger brother Caroline Frederick Scott was an army officer, who gained a reputation for brutality in the aftermath of the 1745 Jacobite Rising.

== Life ==
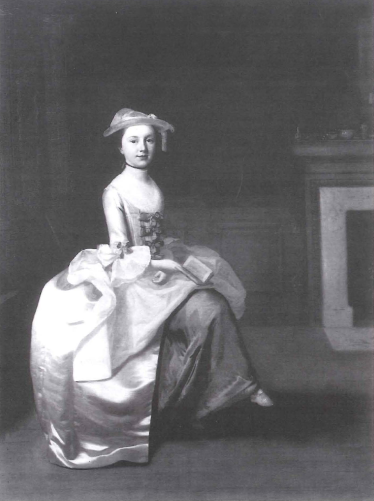
Sarah Scott; married in 1751, they separated in 1752

George Lewis Scott was born in Hanover in 1708, eldest of three sons of James (or George) Scott and Marion Stewart, daughter of Sir James Stewart, Lord Advocate of Scotland. His father was a close friend of George I, then Elector Hanover and held diplomatic posts at various German courts. Hanover's involvement in the Great Northern War made this an extremely sensitive and important position and James was closely involved in negotiations to end it.

His younger brother Caroline Frederick (ca 1711-1754) was named after Caroline of Ansbach (1683-1737), wife of George II and mother of the Duke of Cumberland. When James died in 1726, Marion moved to the Dutch Republic so her children could attend Leiden University. George also studied law at Middle Temple in London, although he does not appear to have practised as a lawyer.

In June 1751, he married the novelist Sarah Robinson; they separated in April 1752, George agreeing to pay her £100 per annum. The reasons are unclear but the two spoke of each other with bitterness for the rest of their lives.

== Career ==
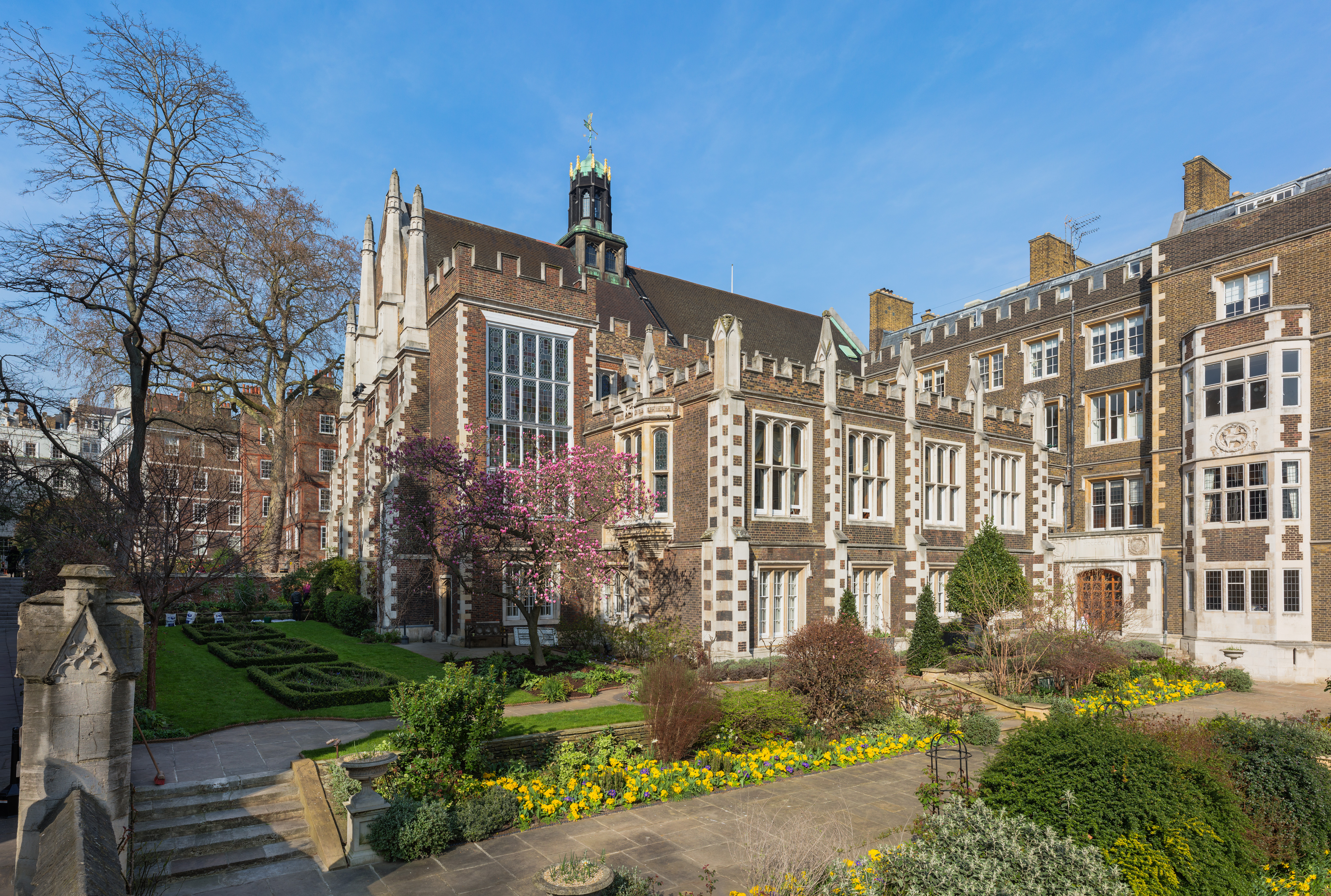
Middle Temple in London, where Scott qualified as a lawyer

Middle Temple was one of the four Inns of Court, all located close to each other and while Scott rarely used his qualification, he made a number of friends there. They included the encyclopaedist Ephraim Chambers (1680-1740), who lived at Gray's Inn and Thomas Robinson (1714-1747), brother of his future wife Sarah, who studied at Lincoln's Inn.

He began his literary career as part of a London circle of expatriate Scots, among them the poet James Thomson and publisher Andrew Millar. The three were members of the Society for the Encouragement of Learning, a society established in London in 1735 He became a Fellow of the Society of Antiquaries on 3 June 1736, and was made a Fellow of the Royal Society on 5 May 1737.

It is suggested he studied under the French Huguenot mathematician, Abraham De Moivre, who lived in London for many years. He was certainly regarded as an expert in the field, as shown by his appointment to the Board of Longitude in the 1760s. Through his mother, he was distantly related to William Trail (1746-1831), Chair of Mathematics at Marischal College from 1767 to 1779 and the two were frequent correspondents. The mathematician Robert Simson was another friend; some of their letters were printed in Trail's Life of Simson.

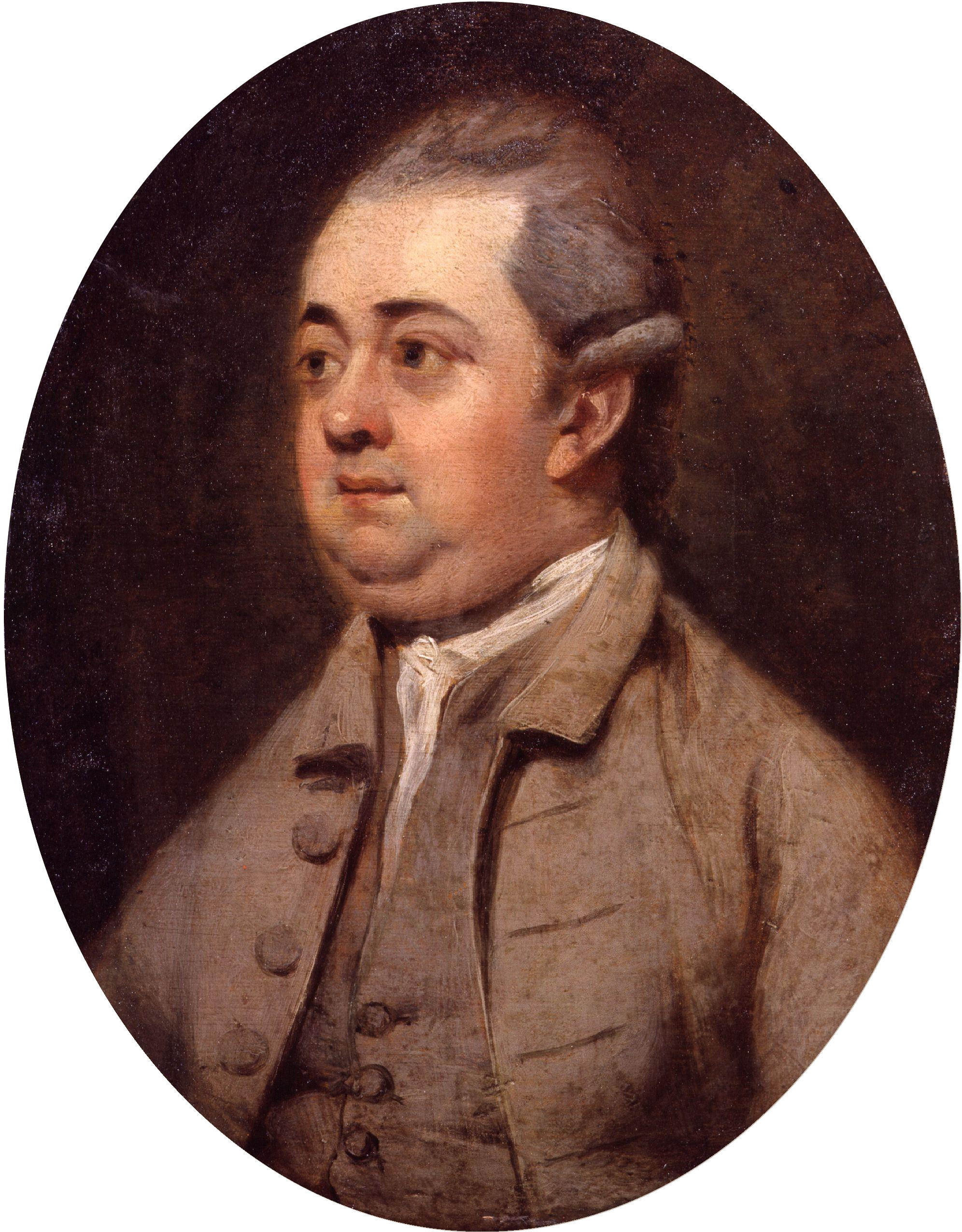
Historian Edward Gibbon (1737-1794) was a close friend

On occasion, Scott acted as a literary agent for former Jacobite statesman and Tory ideologue Viscount Bolingbroke. In November 1750, Bolingbroke recommended Scott to Frederick, Prince of Wales as a suitable sub-preceptor or tutor for his son, the future George III. The prospect of a steady income enabled Scott to marry Sarah Robinson, sister of his friend Thomas and they rented a house in Leicester Square, London.

When Frederick died in April 1751, his son became Prince of Wales and Thomas Hayter, Bishop of Norwich was appointed preceptor or head tutor. Hayter was a political Whig, while Scott was viewed as a Jacobite and his cousin, the economist James Steuart, had been exiled for his part in the 1745 Rebellion. A memorandum was circulated, allegedly written by Horace Walpole, implying George was surrounded by Jacobites, leading to fierce political debate and divisions between Hayter, Scott and other members of the Prince's household.

In April 1752, Sarah was removed from the family home by her father and brothers for undisclosed reasons, although there were a number of rumours. Scott agreed to pay her a pension of £100 per annum, although they never formally divorced. One suggestion was Scott poisoned her; discussing his education in later life, George III claimed Hayter was responsible for this.

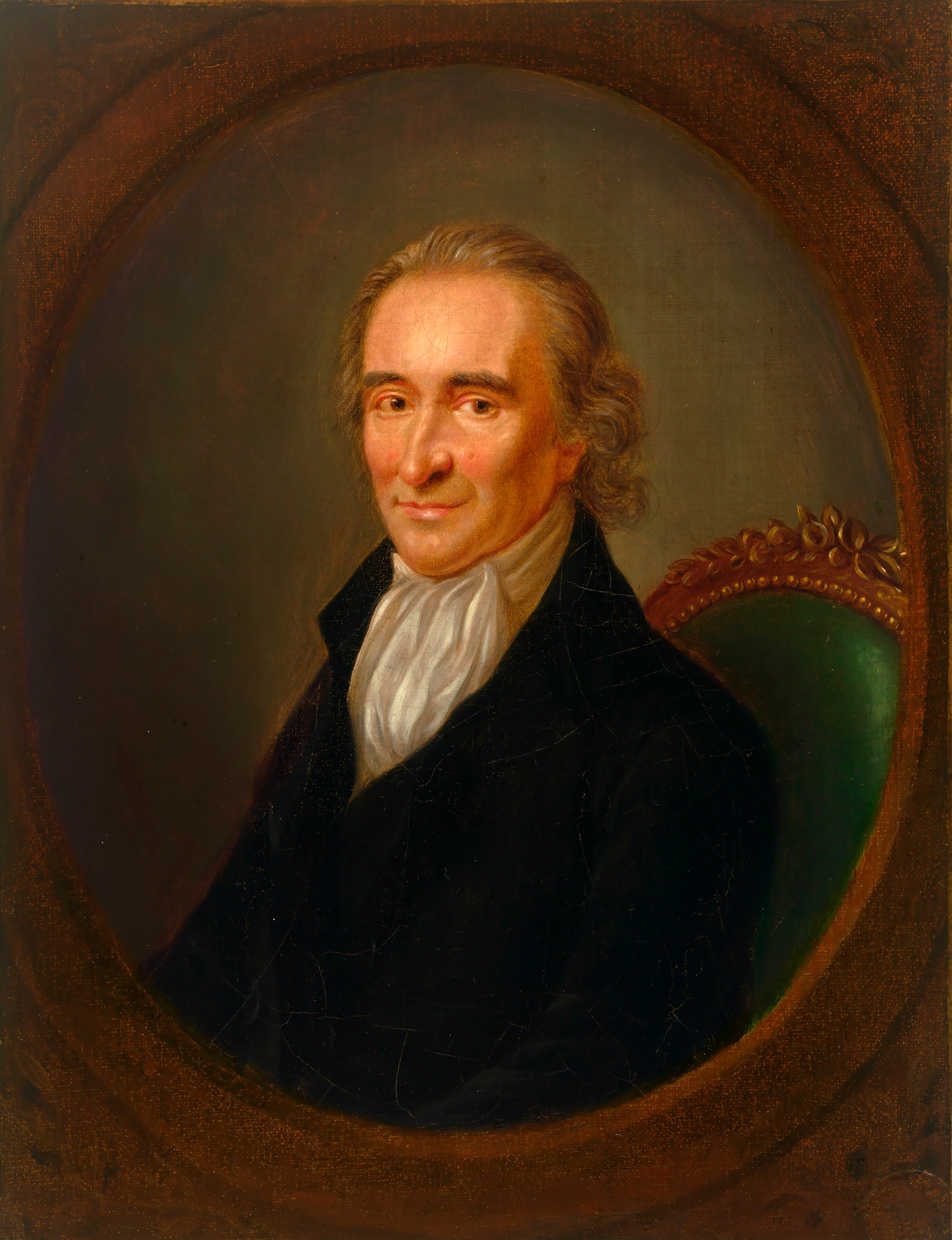
Thomas Paine; Scott reportedly introduced him to Benjamin Franklin

When he died in 1740, Chambers left materials for a supplement to his Dictionary of Arts and Sciences. Scott was asked to prepare these for publication; the two volumes appeared in 1753 and he is said to have received £1,500 for his services. Although he was dismissed as George's tutor in 1755, he was appointed a commissioner of Excise in 1758 and served on the Board of Longitude, testimony to his reputation as a mathematician.

In 1767, Edward Gibbon and Jacques Georges Deyverdun asked him to supply a paper ‘on the present state of the physical and mathematical sciences’ in England, for inclusion in the Mémoires Littéraires de la Grande-Bretagne. In 1775, Gibbon sent him part of his Decline and Fall of the Roman Empire for comments.

As part of the London intelligentsia, he frequently appears in letters from friends and acquaintances. He was considered an excellent musician, and helped Johann Christoph Pepusch with a paper for the Royal Society on ancient Greek music. George Rose, who was Treasurer of the Navy 1807 to 1818 praised him as ‘amiable, honorable, temperate, and one of the sweetest dispositions I ever knew.’ Described as 'tall and big', Fanny Burney described him as ‘very sociable and facetious.’

He was a close friend of Samuel Johnson and Lord Auchinleck, father of the biographer James Boswell who records Scott was 'very kind and polite to me.' One of his most important connections was the political theorist Thomas Paine, who refers to him in 1779 and whose views on George III were allegedly gained from discussions with Scott. He also introduced him to Benjamin Franklin, an act with profound results for the US and Europe.

He died in London on 7 December 1780.

== Sources ==
- Brougham, Lord Henry (1855). Lives of Philosophers of the Time of George III. Richard Griffin.
- Chalmers, Alexander (1812). Chalmer's Biography, Volume 27. Nichols, Son & Bentley.
- Clark, JCD (1825). The Memoirs and Speeches of James, 2nd Earl Waldegrave 1742-1763. Cambridge University Press. ISBN 978-0521526890.
- Courtney, WP (2004). Scott, George Lewis (1708-1780) (2011 ed.). Oxford DNB.
- Kelly, Gary (2006). Scott [née Robinson], Sarah (1720–1795) (Online ed.). Oxford DNB.
- Royle, Trevor (2016). Culloden; Scotland's Last Battle and the Forging of the British Empire. Little, Brown. ISBN 978-1408704011.
- Thompson, FML (editor), Morris, RJ (author) (2008). Clubs, Societies and Associations in The Cambridge Social History of Britain, 1750-1950 Volume III. Cambridge University Press. ISBN 978-0521438148.
