= John Caswell =

English mathematician

John Caswell (sometimes recorded as John Carswell) (1654 or 1655 – 28 April 1712) was an English mathematician who served as Savilian Professor of Astronomy at the University of Oxford from 1709 until his death.

== Life and career ==
John Caswell (sometimes recorded as "Carswell"), was from Crewkerne, Somerset, and he matriculated at Wadham College, Oxford, in March 1671 when he was 16 years old. He obtained his Bachelor of Arts degree in 1674 and his Master of Arts in 1677. He was a pupil of John Wallis, Savilian Professor of Geometry from 1649 until his death in 1703. He worked with the cartographer John Adams on the survey of England and Wales that Adams began in the late 17th century. In 1709, he became Savilian Professor of Astronomy, and also served as vice-principal of Hart Hall, Oxford. He was acquainted with the Scottish mathematician Robert Simson and provided a supporting testimonial when Simson was under consideration for appointment as Professor of Mathematics at the University of Glasgow. Caswell's publications included a book on trigonometry in 1685. He died on 28 April 1712, and is buried in Holywell Cemetery in Oxford. The inscription on his tombstone (since lost) said:

John Caswell M.A., of Somerset by birth, of Wadham by education, a mathematician by discipline, a man upright, kindly and humble; after his unique knowledge had advanced him to the position of Savilian Professor of Astronomy, a much-lamented bodily infirmity took him away – alas – all too swiftly, on 28th April, in the year of our Lord 1712, and in the 56th year of his life. This his wife Elizabeth set up, the monument of her longed-for husband.
