= Simson line =

Line constructed from a triangle

The Simson line LN (red) of the triangle ABC with respect to point P on the circumcircle

In geometry, given a triangle ABC and a point P on its circumcircle, the three closest points to P on lines AB, AC, and BC are collinear. The line through these points is the Simson line of P, named for Robert Simson. The concept was first published, however, by William Wallace in 1799, and is sometimes called the Wallace line.

The converse is also true; if the three closest points to P on three lines are collinear, and no two of the lines are parallel, then P lies on the circumcircle of the triangle formed by the three lines. Or in other words, the Simson line of a triangle ABC and a point P is just the pedal triangle of ABC and P that has degenerated into a straight line and this condition constrains the locus of P to trace the circumcircle of triangle ABC.

== Equation ==
Placing the triangle in the complex plane, let the triangle ABC with unit circumcircle have vertices whose locations have complex coordinates a, b, c, and let P with complex coordinates p be a point on the circumcircle. The Simson line is the set of points z satisfying

$$2abc\bar{z} -2pz+p^2+(a+b+c)p -(bc+ca+ab)-\frac{abc}{p} =0,$$

where an overbar indicates complex conjugation.

== Properties ==
Simson lines (in red) are tangents to the Steiner deltoid (in blue).

- The Simson line of a vertex of the triangle is the altitude of the triangle dropped from that vertex, and the Simson line of the point diametrically opposite to the vertex is the side of the triangle opposite to that vertex.
- If P and Q are points on the circumcircle, then the angle between the Simson lines of P and Q is half the angle of the arc PQ. In particular, if the points are diametrically opposite, their Simson lines are perpendicular and in this case the intersection of the lines lies on the nine-point circle.
- Letting H denote the orthocenter of the triangle ABC, the Simson line of P bisects the segment PH in a point that lies on the nine-point circle.
- Given two triangles with the same circumcircle, the angle between the Simson lines of a point P on the circumcircle for both triangles does not depend of P.
- The set of all Simson lines, when drawn, form an envelope in the shape of a deltoid known as the Steiner deltoid of the reference triangle. The Steiner deltoid circumscribes the nine-point circle and its center is the nine-point center.
- The construction of the Simson line that coincides with a side of the reference triangle (see first property above) yields a nontrivial point on this side line. This point is the reflection of the foot of the altitude (dropped onto the side line) about the midpoint of the side line being constructed. Furthermore, this point is a tangent point between the side of the reference triangle and its Steiner deltoid.
- A quadrilateral that is not a parallelogram has one and only one pedal point, called the Simson point, with respect to which the feet on the quadrilateral are collinear. The Simson point of a trapezoid is the point of intersection of the two nonparallel sides.
- No convex polygon with at least 5 sides has a Simson line.

== Proof of existence ==
It suffices to show that $\angle NMP + \angle PML = 180^\circ$.

$PCAB$ is a cyclic quadrilateral, so $\angle PBA + \angle ACP = \angle PBN + \angle ACP = 180^\circ$. $PMNB$ is a cyclic quadrilateral (since $\angle PMB=\angle PNB = 90^\circ$), so $\angle PBN + \angle NMP = 180^\circ$. Hence $\angle NMP = \angle ACP$. Now $PLCM$ is cyclic, so $\angle PML = \angle PCL = 180^\circ - \angle ACP$.

Therefore $\angle NMP + \angle PML = \angle ACP + (180^\circ - \angle ACP) = 180^\circ$.

== Generalizations ==
=== Generalization 1 ===
The projections of Ap, Bp, Cp onto BC, CA, AB are three collinear points

- Let ABC be a triangle, let a line ℓ go through circumcenter O, and let a point P lie on the circumcircle. Let AP, BP, CP meet ℓ at A_{p}, B_{p}, C_{p} respectively. Let A_{0}, B_{0}, C_{0} be the projections of A_{p}, B_{p}, C_{p} onto BC, CA, AB, respectively. Then A_{0}, B_{0}, C_{0} are collinear. Moreover, the new line passes through the midpoint of PH, where H is the orthocenter of ΔABC. If ℓ passes through P, the line coincides with the Simson line.

A projective version of a Simson line

=== Generalization 2 ===
- Let the vertices of the triangle ABC lie on the conic Γ, and let Q, P be two points in the plane. Let PA, PB, PC intersect the conic at A_{1}, B_{1}, C_{1} respectively. QA_{1} intersects BC at A_{2}, QB_{1} intersects AC at B_{2}, and QC_{1} intersects AB at C_{2}. Then the four points A_{2}, B_{2}, C_{2}, and P are collinear if only if Q lies on the conic Γ.

=== Generalization 3 ===
- R. F. Cyster generalized the theorem to cyclic quadrilaterals in The Simson Lines of a Cyclic Quadrilateral

== See also ==
- Longuerre's theorem
- Pedal triangle
- Robert Simson
