= Robert Simson =

Scottish mathematician (1687–1768)

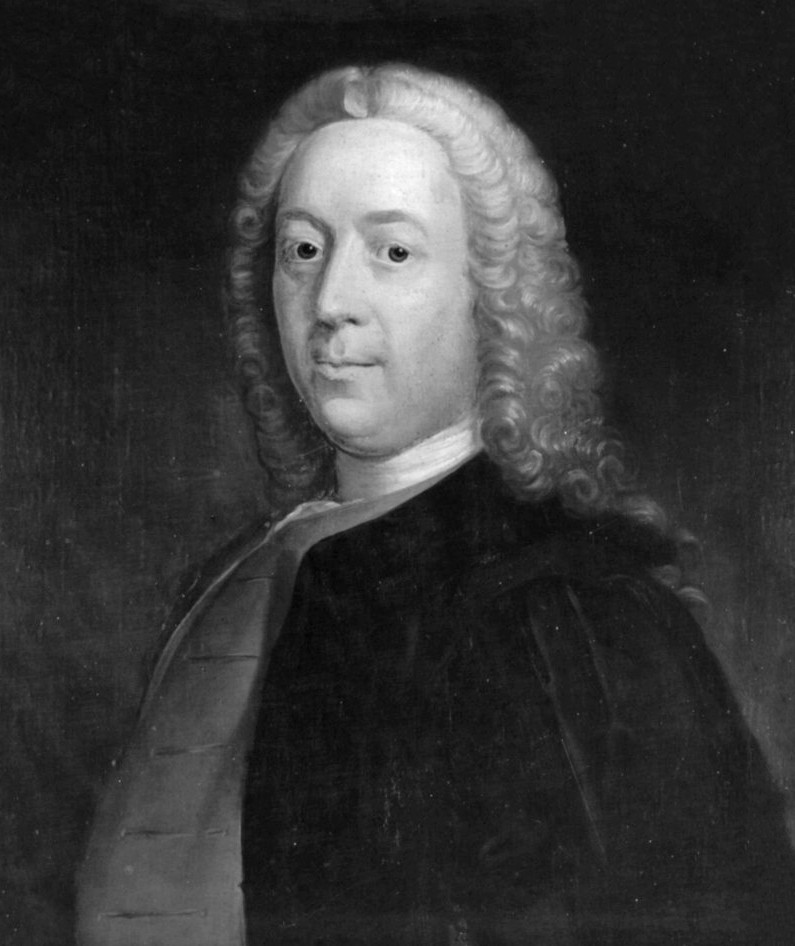
- Robert Simson
- Born: 14 October 1687
- Died: 1 October 1768 (aged 80); His college residence at Glasgow
- Resting place: Ramshorn Cemetery
- Education: University of Glasgow
- Known for: Simson line Simson's identity
- Scientific career
- Fields: Mathematics, especially geometry
- Institutions: University of Glasgow; Christ's Hospital
- Notable students: Maclaurin; Matthew Stewart; William Trail; James Williamson (mathematician)

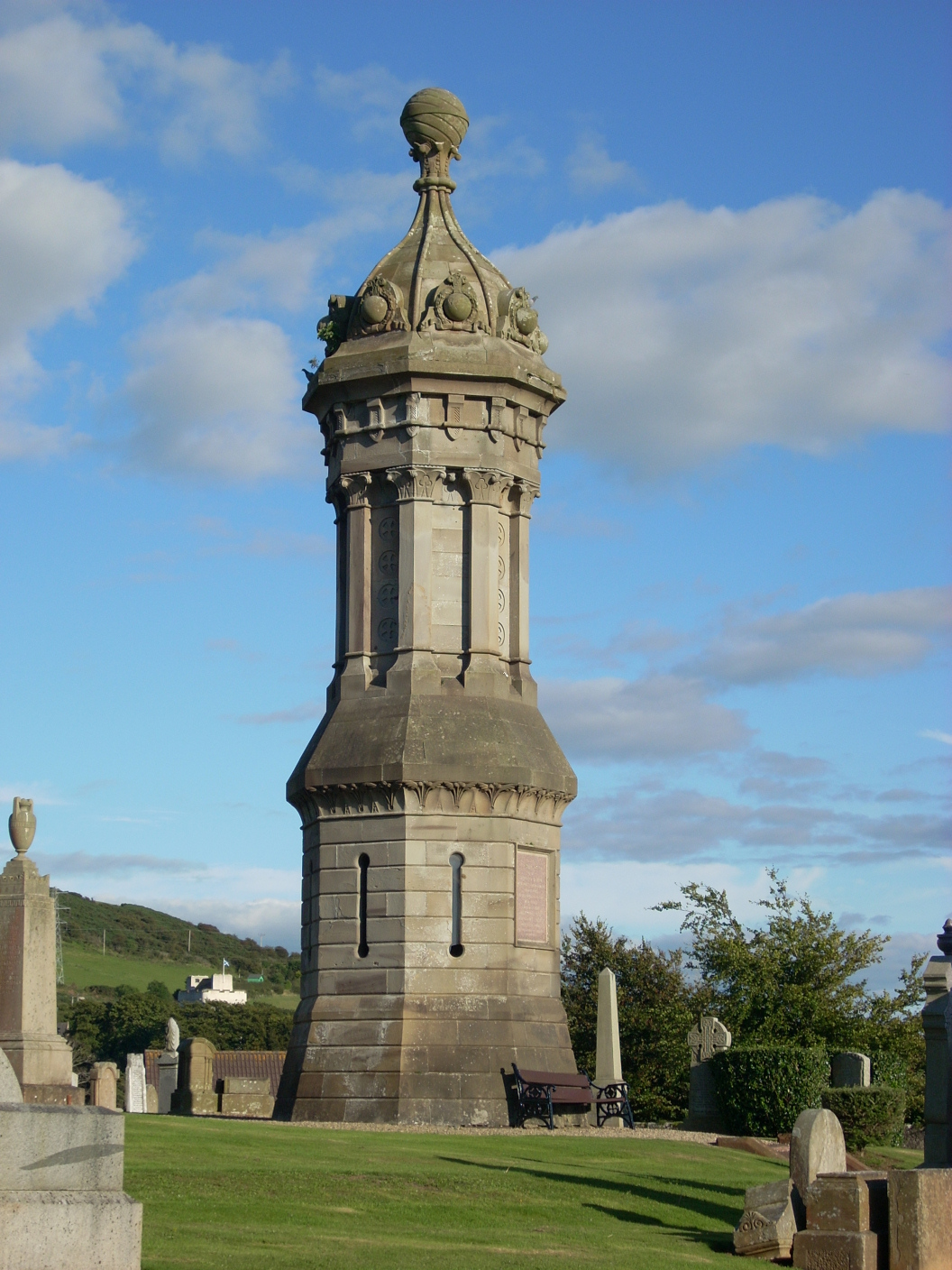
Memorial to Robert Simson in West Kilbride cemetery. The memorial plate reads "To Dr. Robert Simson of the University of Glasgow, the Restorer of Grecian Geometry; and by his works, the great promoter of its study in the Schools. A Native of this Parish."

Robert Simson (14 October 1687 – 1 October 1768) was a Scottish mathematician and professor of mathematics at the University of Glasgow. The Simson line is named after him.

== Biography ==
Robert Simson was born on 14 October 1687, probably the eldest of the seventeen children, all male, of John Simson, a Glasgow merchant, and Agnes, daughter of Patrick Simpson, minister of Renfrew; only six of them reached adulthood.

Simson matriculated at the University of Glasgow in 1701, intending to enter the Church. He followed the course in the faculty of arts (Latin, Greek, logic, natural philosophy) and then concentrated on studying theology and Semitic languages. Mathematics was not taught at the university, but by reading Sinclair's Tuyrocinia Mathematica in Novem Tractatus and then Euclid's Elements Simson soon became deeply interested in mathematics and especially geometry. His efforts impressed the university Senate to such an extent that they offered him the chair of mathematics, to replace the recently dismissed Sinclair. As he had had no formal training in the subject, Simson turned down the offer but agreed to take up the post a year later, during which time he would increase his knowledge of mathematics.

After a failed attempt to go to Oxford, Simson spent his year in London at Christ's Hospital. During this time he made valuable contacts with several prominent mathematicians, including John Caswell, James Jurin (secretary of the Royal Society), Humphrey Ditton and, most importantly, Edmond Halley.

Simson was admitted professor of mathematics at Glasgow, aged 23, on 20 November 1711, where his first task was to design a two-year course in mathematics, some of which he taught himself; his lectures included geometry, of course, and algebra, logarithms and optics. Among his students were Maclaurin, Matthew Stewart, and William Trail. He resigned the post in 1761, and was succeeded by another of his pupils Rev Prof James Williamson FRSE (1725–1795).

During his time at Glasgow Simson noted in 1753 that, as the Fibonacci numbers increased in magnitude, the ratio between adjacent numbers approached the golden ratio, whose value is

$\varphi = \frac{1+\sqrt5}{2} =$1.618033988749....

As for the man himself, "Simson appears to have been tall and of good stature. In spite of his great scholarship he was a modest, unassuming man who was very cautious in promoting his own work. He enjoyed good company and presided over the weekly meetings of a dining club that he had instituted … He had a special interest in botany, in which he was an acknowledged expert".

Robert Simson did not marry. He died, aged 80, in his college residence at Glasgow on 1 October 1768, and was interred in the Blackfriars Burying Ground (now known as Ramshorn Cemetery), where, in the south wall, is placed to his memory a plain marble tablet, with a highly and justly complimentary inscription". Simson's library, including some of his own works, was bequeathed to the university on his death. It consists of about 850 printed books, mainly early mathematical and astronomical texts.

Subscriptions towards the erection of a monument to Dr Simson were collected in 1865, with the Senate of the College of Glasgow, the (thirteenth) Earl of Eglinton and Winton, and the Earl Stanhope each donating £10; and John Carrick Moore – the first cousin twice removed of Robert Simson – giving £15. The memorial, designed by Frederick Thomas Pilkington, is "a large octagonal monument with carved Egyptian details, topped with a ball finial". It is situated on a hilltop in West Kilbride cemetery.

== Works ==
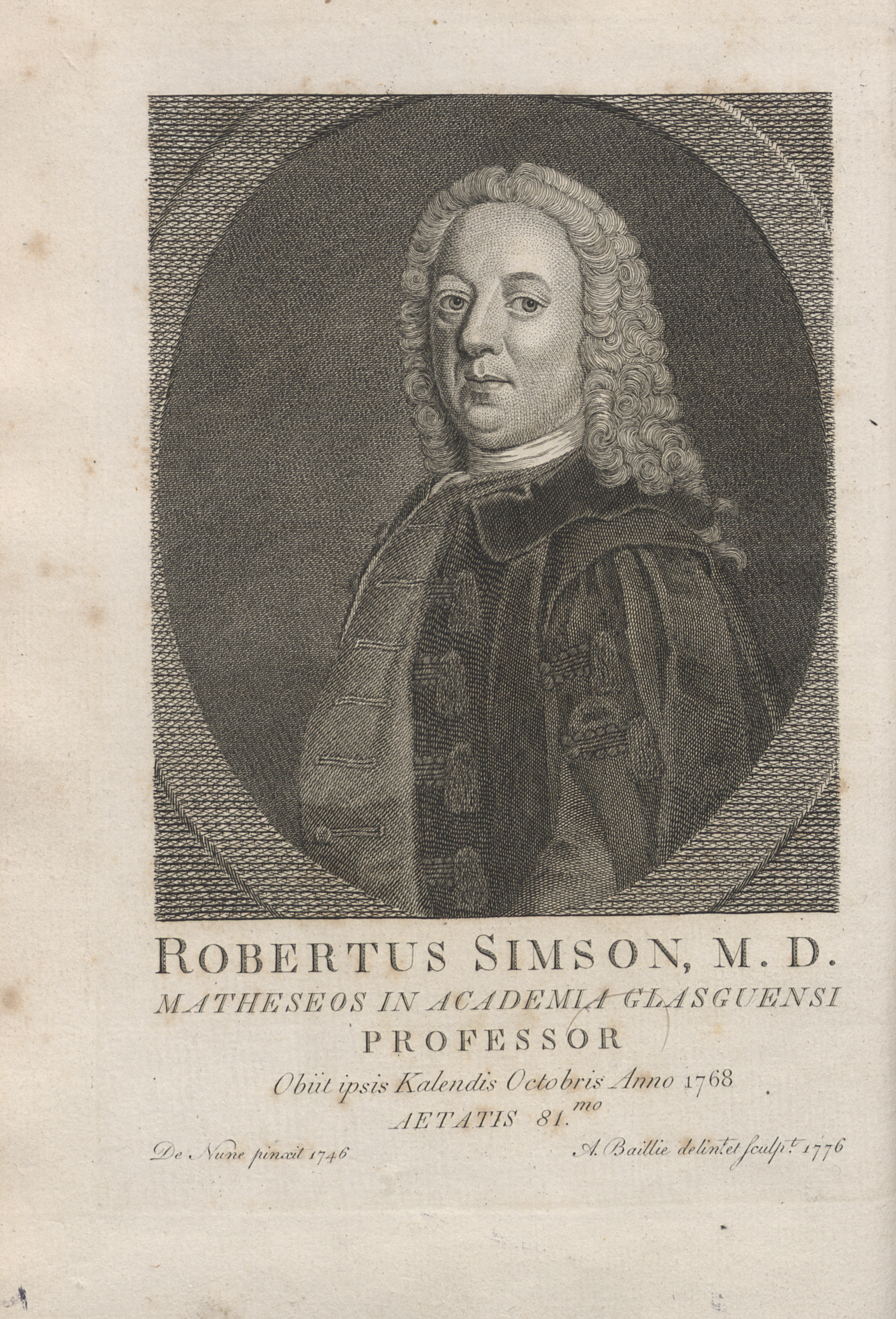
Opera quaedam reliqua, 1776

Simson's contributions to mathematical knowledge took the form of critical editions and commentaries on the works of the ancient geometers. The first of his published writings is a paper in the Philosophical Transactions (1723, vol. xl. p. 330) on Euclid's Porisms.

Then followed Sectionum conicarum libri V. (Edinburgh, 1735), a second edition of which, with additions, appeared in 1750. The first three books of this treatise were translated into English and, several times, printed as The Elements of the Conic Sections. In 1749, was published Apollonii Pergaei locorum planorum libri II., a restoration of Apollonius's lost treatise, founded on the lemmas given in the seventh book of Pappus's Mathematical Collection.

In 1756, appeared, both in Latin and in English, the first edition of his Euclid's Elements. This work, which contained only the first six and the eleventh and twelfth books, and to which, in its English version, he added the Data in 1762, was for long the standard text of Euclid in England.

After Simson's death, restorations of Apollonius's treatise De section determinata and of Euclid's treatise De Porismatibus were printed for private circulation in 1776, at the expense of Earl Stanhope, in a volume with the title Roberti Simson opera quaedam reliqua. The volume contains also dissertations on Logarithms and on the Limits of Quantities and Ratios, and a few problems illustrating the ancient geometrical analysis.
