= Professor of Mathematics (Glasgow) =

Position at the University of Glasgow in Glasgow, Scotland

The Chair of Mathematics in the University of Glasgow in Scotland was established in 1691. Previously, under James VI's Nova Erectio, the teaching of Mathematics had been the responsibility of the Regents.

== List of Mathematics Professors ==
- George Sinclair MA (1691–1696)
- Robert Sinclair MA MD (1699)
- Robert Simson MA MD (1711)
- Rev Prof James Williamson FRSE MA DD (1761)
- James Millar MA (1796)
- James Thomson MA LLD (1832)
- Hugh Blackburn MA (1849)
- William Jack MA LLD (1879)
- George Alexander Gibson MA LLD (1909)
- Thomas Murray MacRobert MA DSc LLD (1927)
- Robert Alexander Rankin MA PhD DSc FRSE (1954–1982)
- Robert Winston Keith Odoni BSc PhD FRSE (1989–2001)
- Peter Kropholler (2003–2013)
- Michael Wemyss (2016–)

== See also ==
- List of Professorships at the University of Glasgow
