= Whitefoord House =

Mansion in Edinburgh, Scotland

Coordinates: 55°57′10″N 3°10′36″W

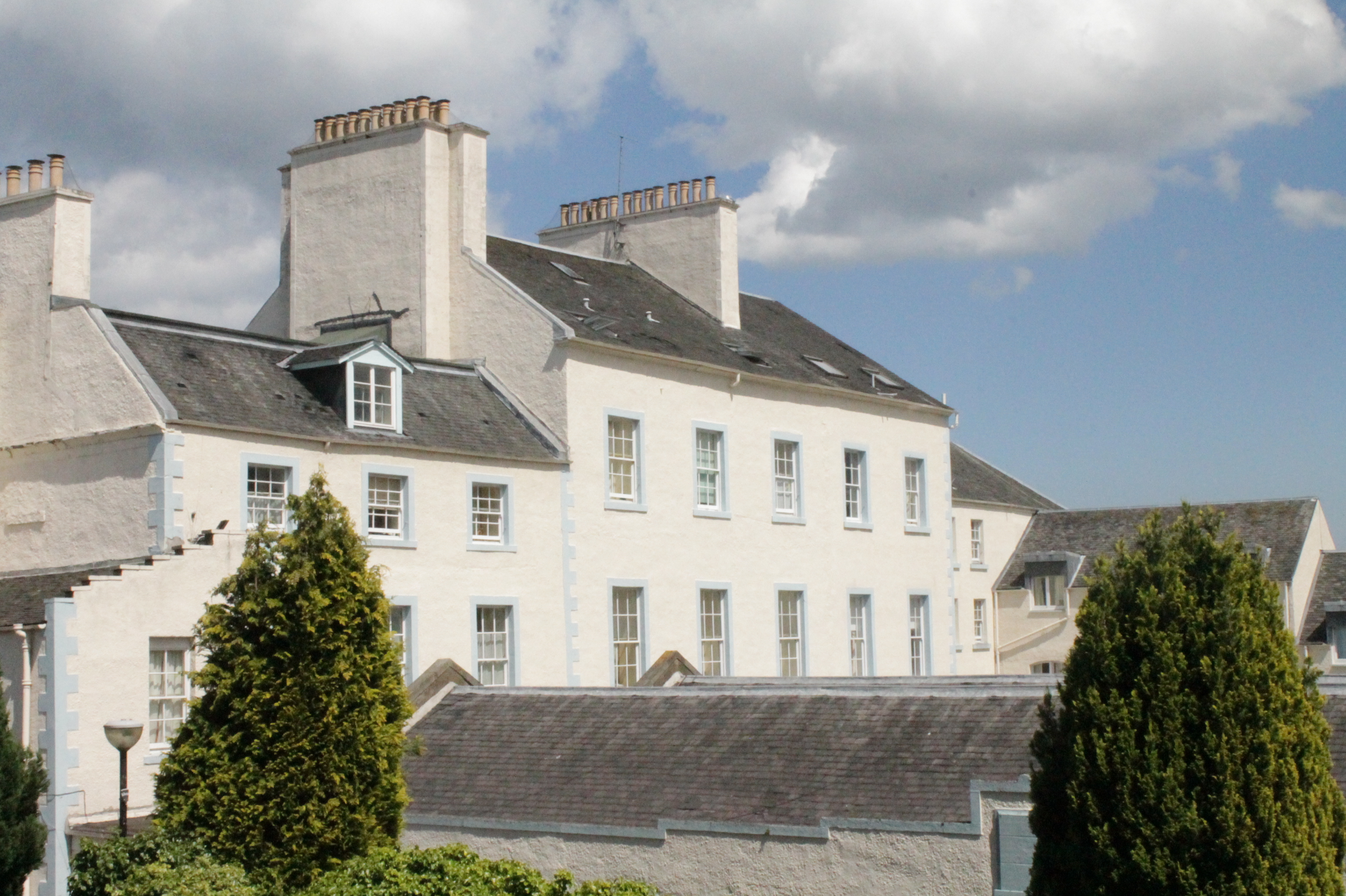
Whitefoord House on the Canongate

Whitefoord House (or occasionally Whiteford House is an 18th-century former mansion on the Canongate section of the Royal Mile in Edinburgh. It stands on the north side of the Royal Mile obscured by more modern buildings, under a backdrop of Calton Hill.

== History ==
The house was built in 1769 as the townhouse of Sir John Whitefoord of Ballochmyle in Ayrshire, opposite the existing mansion, Queensberry House. It was designed by the King's Master Mason Robert Mylne. The site had previously held Seton Palace or Seton's Lodging, the Edinburgh home of Lord Seton, and regular point of call for foreign diplomats. It was also used by Lord Darnley. The house was previously standing behind the infamous "Jenny Ha's Tavern" on the Canongate. Sir John lost his Ballochmyle estate in the collapse of the bankers "Douglas, Heron & Company" in 1773 and thereafter lived solely in Whitefoord House. As one of the original patrons to the poetry of Robert Burns it is certain that Burns visited the house on at least one occasion. Sir John died in the house in 1803.

Professor Dugald Stewart lived here in the late 18th century.

The building then passed to William Bannatyne, Lord Bannatyne. He died in the house in 1833.

The building stands on Galloway's Entry, named after Alexander Galloway who owned stables in the area in 1804. Around 1850 the building was converted into a foundry making typeset for Edinburgh's many printworks, and its rich interior was entirely stripped out.

In 1926, Scotland's first Poppy Factory was established here by Lady Haig, employing injured ex-servicemen to create poppies.

After the Second World War, Whitefoord House was converted into housing for army veterans and remains in this use, under the ownership of the Scottish Veterans Residences, aimed at providing low-cost housing, with shared facilities for ex-servicemen. From 2003 they also provided accommodation for couples.

Since 2018, the site has been secure and generally inaccessible except to residents.
