= Matthew Stewart (mathematician) =

Scottish mathematician (1717–1785)

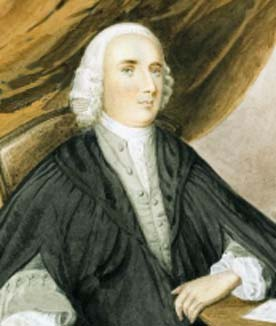
Colour print of Matthew Stewart

Matthew Stewart FRS FRSE (1717–1785) was a Scottish mathematician and minister of the Church of Scotland.

== Life ==
He was born in the manse at Rothesay, on the Isle of Bute, on 28 June 1717, the son of Rev Dugald Stewart, the local minister, and his wife, Janet Bannantyne.

He was educated at Rothesay Grammar School, then entered the University of Glasgow in 1734, where he studied under the philosopher Francis Hutcheson and the mathematician Robert Simson, the latter from whom he studied ancient geometry. A close friendship developed between Simson and Stewart, in part because of their mutual admiration of Pappus of Alexandria, which resulted in many curious communications with respect to the De Locis Planis of Apollonius of Perga and the Porisms of Euclid over the years. This correspondence suggests that Stewart spent several weeks in Glasgow starting May 1743 assisting Robert Simson in the production of his Apollonii Pergaei locorum planorum libri II, which was published in 1749.

However, his father persuaded him to enter the ministry (this was a normal father-son expectation in the ministry). He studied Divinity at Edinburgh University in the year 1742/43 also attending maths lectures under Colin Maclaurin. He was licensed by the Presbytery of the Church of Scotland of Dunoon in May 1744, and became a minister at Rosneath in Dunbartonshire one year later.

In 1746, following the death of Colin Maclaurin, the chair as Professor of Mathematics became vacant at Edinburgh University and just over one year later Stewart left the ministry to become Professor of Mathematics. Publication of his best known work, Some General Theorems of Considerable use in the Higher Parts of Mathematics may have helped him secure the post. This book extended some ideas of Robert Simson and is best known for proposition II, or what is now known as Stewart's theorem, which relates measurements on a triangle to an additional line through a vertex. Stewart also provided a solution to Kepler's problem using geometrical methods in 1756, and a book describing planetary motion and the perturbation of one planet on another in 1761, along with a supplement on the distance between the Sun and Earth in 1763, Tracts Physical and Mathematical and The Distance of the Sun from the Earth determined by the Theory of Gravity respectively. The latter work overestimated the distance by more than 25%, for which his geometrical method received some criticism for being oversimplified.

In 1772 his health began to deteriorate and his duties as professor at Edinburgh were initially shared, then taken over by, his son Dugald Stewart, who later became a prominent Scottish philosopher. Matthew ceased teaching in 1775 but continued to play a role in Edinburgh society, most notably being a joint founder of the Royal Society of Edinburgh in 1783.

== Family ==
He married Marjory Stewart, a cousin.

He was father of the philosopher Dugald Stewart.

He was the father-in-law of the physician Patrick Miller FRSE (1782-1871) and grandfather of Colonel Matthew Stewart (c.1784-1851).

== Freemasonry ==
Stewart was a Scottish Freemason. He was Initiated in Lodge Canongate Kilwinning, No. 2, on 28 November 1835. His son, the noted philosopher, Dugald Stewart (1753 - 1828) was also a member of this Lodge (1775).

== Death ==
He died at Catrine, Ayrshire on 23 January 1785, but was buried at Greyfriars Kirkyard in central Edinburgh. As the burial was during a period of strict regulation of stones (effectively a ban) the grave is unmarked.

== See also ==
- Stewart's theorem
