= William Trail =

British mathematician and clergyman (1746–1831)

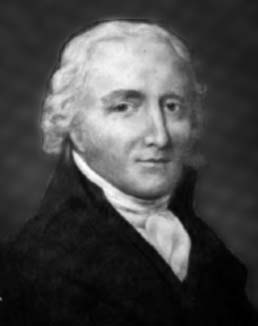
- Born: 23 June 1746; Montrose, Angus, Scotland
- Died: 3 February 1831 (aged 84); Bath, Somerset, England
- Education: University of Glasgow
- Known for: Text books
- Scientific career
- Fields: Mathematics
- Workplaces: Marischal College (University of Aberdeen)

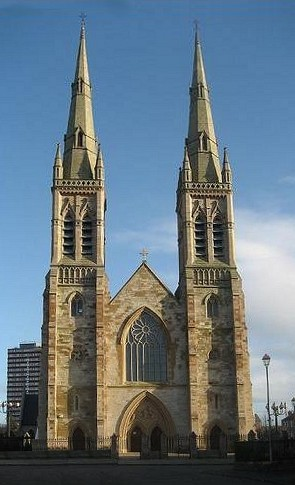
The church at Down and Connor

William Trail or Traill FRSE MRIA (23 June 1746 – 3 February 1831) was a Scots-born mathematician, remembered for his mathematical text books. For the majority of his life, he served church duties in Northern Ireland.

== Life ==
Sources are unclear on Trail's parentage. The Oxford Dictionary of National Biography states he was the son of the Rev. William Trail (1712–1756), minister of St Monance, Fife, and Mary Trail (1731–1756). The Royal Society of Edinburgh states he was the son of the Rev. James Traill. James left Scotland in 1756 to minister in Northern Ireland and in 1765 became Bishop of Down and Connor, dying in 1783. Through his grandmother Agnes Trail, the younger William was related to the mathematician George Lewis Scott and the two were frequent correspondents.

In 1759, he entered in Marischal College (Aberdeen) and in 1763 he moved to University of Glasgow where he studied under Robert Simson and graduated M.A. in 1766.

In 1766 he was successful to obtain the chair of mathematics in Marischal College (in competition with John Playfair and Robert Hamilton).

In 1779 he resigned the professorship, and moved to Northern Ireland as Chancellor of Down and Connor church under his father, the bishop. He remained thereafter in the Church of Ireland, playing his religious duties for the following forty years.

In 1783 he was in Edinburgh as one of the joint founders of the Royal Society of Edinburgh.

He retired to Bath, Somerset with his wife around 1821 and died there on 3 February 1831.

== Publications ==
In 1770 he published Elements of Algebra for the use of Students in Universities which was his most famous opera and became a very popular book.

Trail is also well known by a biography of Robert Simson published in 1812; as biography it is not well-regarded, though it does give a lot of first-hand information about Simson and his geometrical studies.

== Family ==
In 1799 he married Lady Frances Charteris (1754-1848) eldest daughter of Francis Wemyss-Charteris and granddaughter of the Duke of Gordon. She was 45 years old when they married and they did not have children. She died in Bath in 1848.

== Bibliography ==
- Gibson, G.A. (1928). "Sketch of the History of Mathematics in Scotland to the end of the 18th Century: Part II". Proceedings of the Edinburgh Mathematical Society. Series 2. 1 (2): 71–93. doi:10.1017/S0013091500007409.
- Tweddle, Ian (2000). Simson on Porisms. Springer. ISBN 978-1-84996-862-1.
