= Dugald Stewart =

Scottish philosopher and mathematician (1753–1828)

Dugald Stewart FRS FRSE
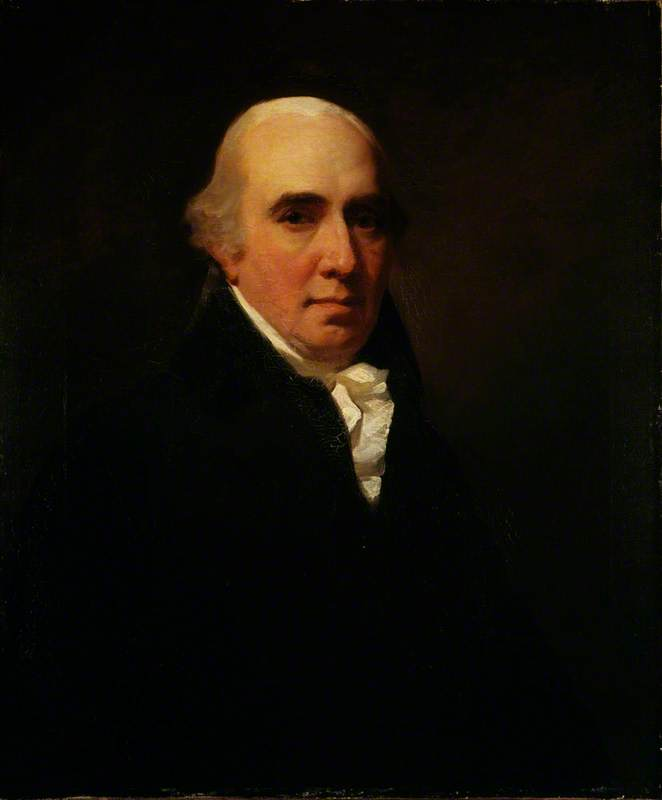
- Dugald Stewart as painted by Henry Raeburn, c. 1810
- Born: 22 November 1753; Edinburgh, Scotland
- Died: 11 June 1828 (aged 74); Edinburgh, Scotland

Education
- Education: University of Edinburgh

Philosophical work
- Era: 18th-century philosophy
- Region: Western philosophy
- School: Scottish common sense realism Scottish Enlightenment
- Institutions: University of Edinburgh
- Main interests: Moral philosophy
- Notable ideas: Political economy as part of philosophy

Dugald Stewart (/ˈdjuːɡəld/; 22 November 1753 – 11 June 1828) was a Scottish philosopher and mathematician. Today regarded as one of the most important figures of the later Scottish Enlightenment, he was renowned as a populariser of the work of Francis Hutcheson and of Adam Smith. Trained in mathematics, medicine and philosophy, his lectures at the University of Edinburgh were widely disseminated by his many influential students. In 1783 he was a joint founder of the Royal Society of Edinburgh. In most contemporary documents he is referred to as Dougal Stewart.

== Early life ==
He was the son of Matthew Stewart (1715–1785), professor of mathematics at the University of Edinburgh (1747–1772), and was born in his father's quarters at Old College. His mother was Marjory Stewart, his father's cousin.

He was educated at the High School and the University of Edinburgh, where he studied mathematics and moral philosophy under Adam Ferguson. In 1771, in the hope of gaining a Snell Exhibition Scholarship and proceeding to Oxford to study for the English Church, he went to the University of Glasgow to attend the classes of Thomas Reid. To Reid he later owed his theory of morality. In Glasgow, Stewart boarded in the same house as Archibald Alison, author of the Essay on Taste, and a lasting friendship sprang up between them.

After a single session in Glasgow University, at the age of nineteen, Dugald was asked by his father, whose health was beginning to fail, to give his mathematical classes in the University of Edinburgh. After three years there, in 1775, Dugald was elected joint professor of mathematics in conjunction with his father. Three years later Ferguson was appointed secretary to the commissioners sent out to the American colonies, and at his request Stewart lectured as his substitute during the session 1778–1779, delivering an original course of lectures on morals. In his early years he was influenced by Lord Monboddo, with whom he corresponded.

== Professor at Edinburgh ==
In 1785 Stewart succeeded Ferguson in the chair of moral philosophy, which he filled for twenty-five years, making it a centre of intellectual and moral influence. Young men were attracted by his reputation from England, Europe and America. Greatly influenced by the Irish Presbyterian Francis Hutcheson who, in the preceding generation, had held the chair of moral philosophy at the University of Glasgow, Stewart's course on moral philosophy embraced, besides ethics proper, lectures on political philosophy or the theory of government.

William Drennan, whose father Thomas Drennan had been secretary to Hutcheson, and who 1791 moved the formation of the Society of United Irishmen in Belfast and in Dublin, was a student and friend. It is from Stewart that Drennan is said to have "imbibed the classical tradition of republican theory, in its most famous English embodiment in the works of John Locke, and its contemporary reincarnation in the works of Richard Price and Joseph Priestley".

Stewart's dissident rationalism greatly influenced Maria Edgeworth and Elizabeth Hamilton. They drew extensively on his work in constructing educational programmes that rested on the assumption that women, and especially mothers, were intellectually capable of understanding the importance of the early association of ideas in the training of children's emotions and reasoning powers.

Stewart spent the summers of 1788 and 1789 in France, where he met Suard, Degérando, and Raynal, and came to sympathise with the revolutionary movement. His political teaching, after the French Revolution, drew suspicion on him. His Edinburgh residence for several years was Whitefoord House on the Royal Mile.

From 1800 to 1801, Stewart gave lectures to undergraduate students on the subject of political economy, the first person to do so. Stewart made himself the leading disciple of Adam Smith and, after Smith's death became his first biographer. In 1793 Stewart had read his Account of the Life and Writings of Adam Smith to the Royal Society of Edinburgh.

In 1797 he appears as "Dougald Stewart, professor of moral philosophy" living at Lothian House (aka Lothian Hutt) near the bottom of the Canongate. Lothian Hutt was built in 1750 by William, Marquess of Lothian, who appears to have been a friend of Stewart. Stewart was still staying here in 1813.

== Family ==
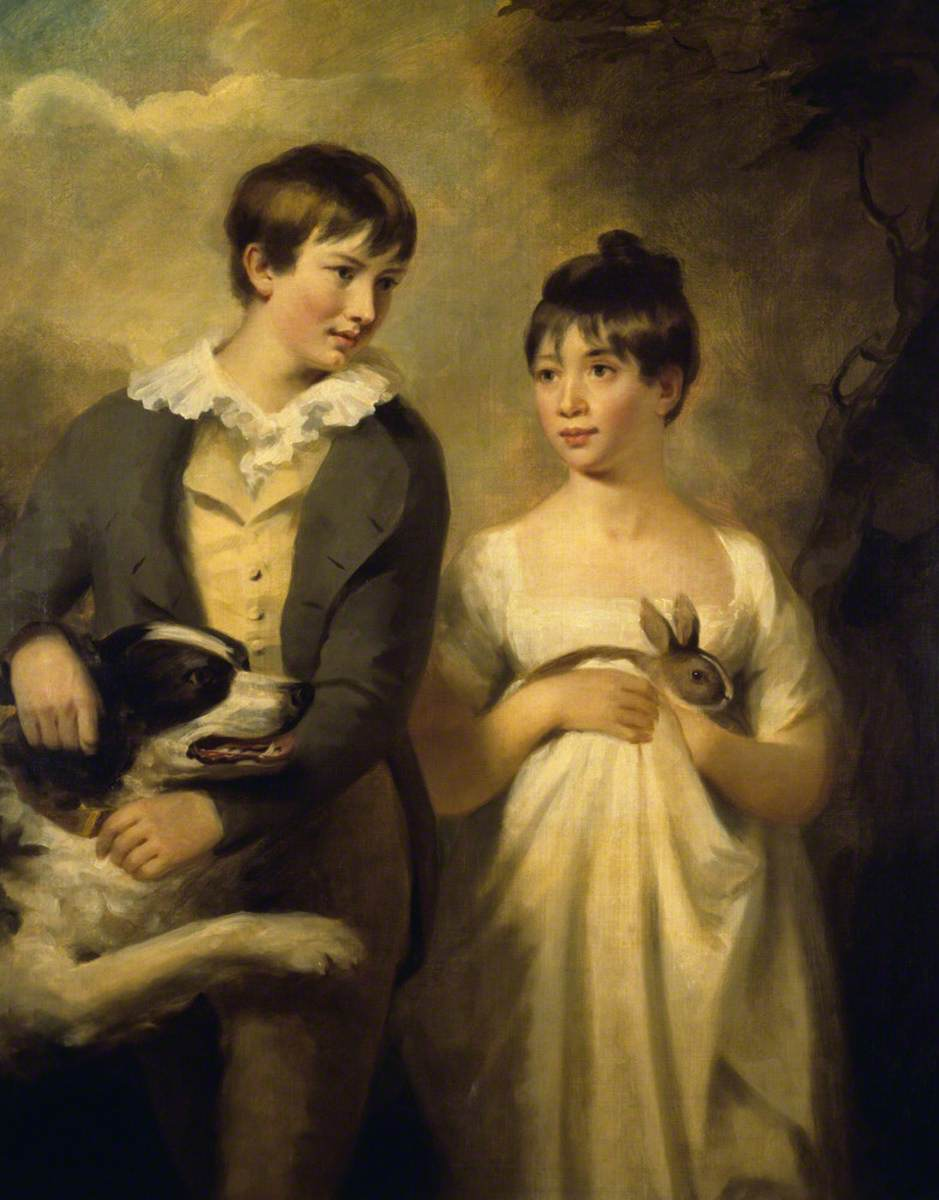
The Children of Professor Dugald Stewart, George (d.1809), and Maria (d.1846), as Children, paining by Henry Raeburn, 1800-1809.

In 1783 Stewart married Helen Bannatyne (a distant cousin), who died in 1787, leaving him an only son, Matthew Stewart FRSE (1784-1851). In 1790 he married Helen D'Arcy Cranstoun, sister of George Cranstoun. His second wife was well-born and accomplished, and he was in the habit of submitting to her criticism whatever he wrote. They had a son and a daughter. The son's death in 1809 brought about his retirement from the active duties of his chair.

His sister, Janet Stewart, married Rev Thomas Miller of Cumnock, and they were parents to Dr Patrick Miller FRSE (1782-1871).

== Later life ==
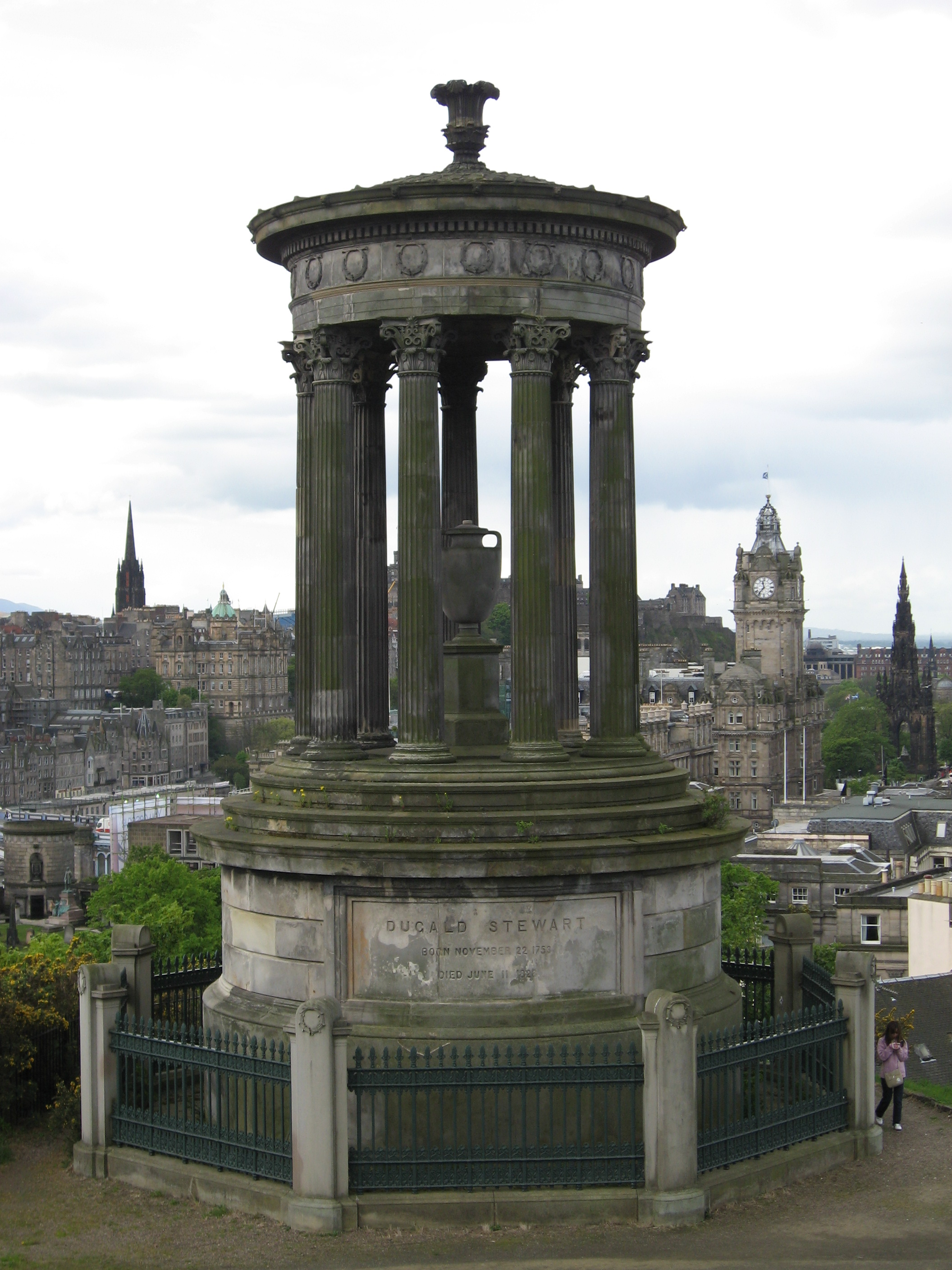
Dugald Stewart Monument, Edinburgh

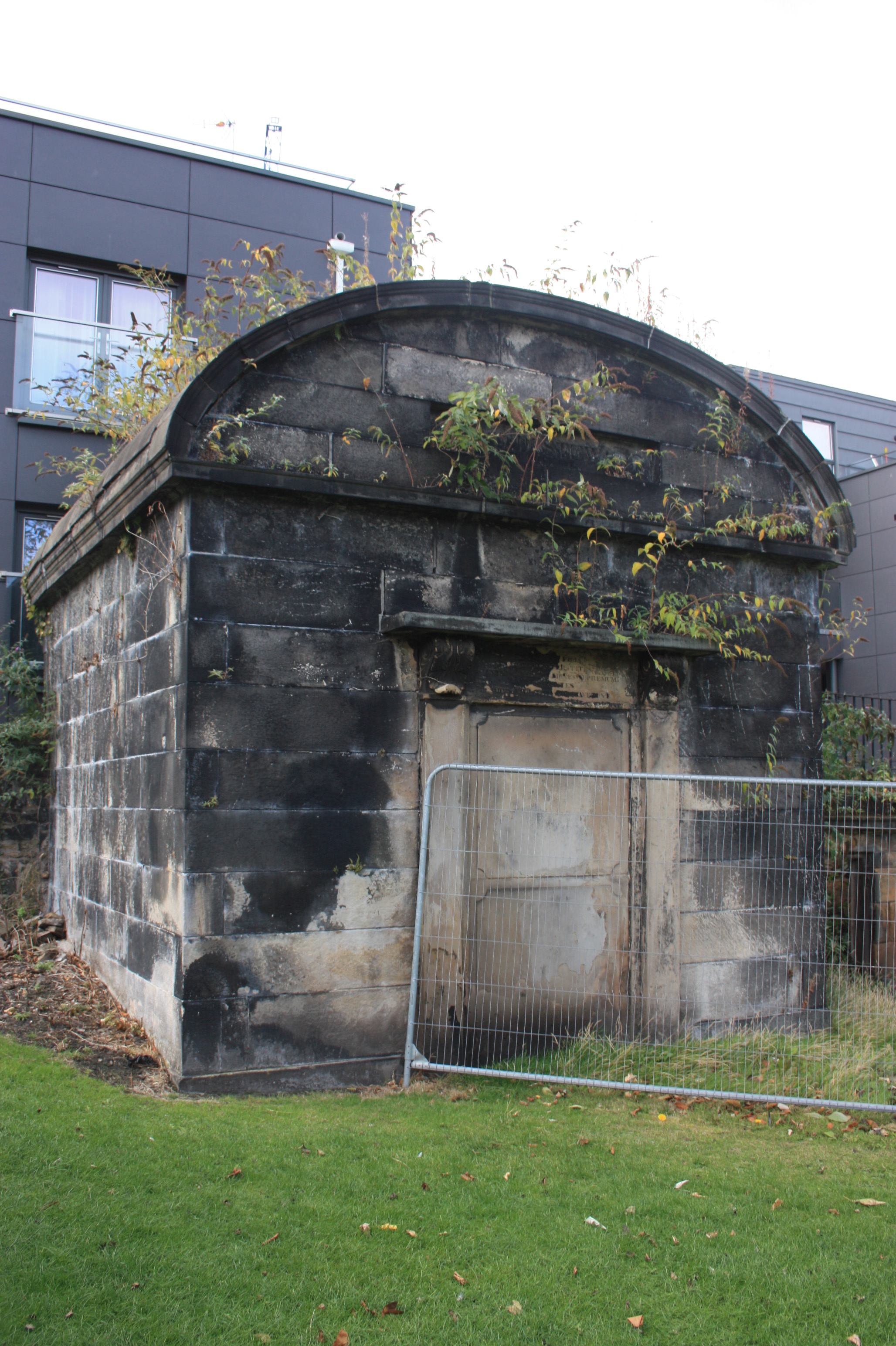
The tomb of Dugald Stewart, Canongate Kirkyard

In 1806 Stewart received in lieu of a pension the nominal office of the writership of the Edinburgh Gazette, with a salary of £300. When he ceased lecturing during the session of 1809–1810, his place was taken, at his own request, by Thomas Brown, who in 1810 was appointed conjoint professor. On the death of Brown in 1820 Stewart retired altogether from the professorship. His successor was John Wilson, known as "Christopher North".

From 1809 onwards Stewart lived mainly at Kinneil House, Bo'ness, which was placed at his disposal by the Duke of Hamilton. He was elected to the American Philosophical Society in 1791. In June 1814 Stewart was elected a Fellow of the Royal Society. He was elected a Foreign Honorary Member of the American Academy of Arts and Sciences in 1817.

== Freemasonry ==
Like his father, Rev Dr Matthew Stewart, he was a Scottish Freemason. He was Initiated in the Lodge of his father - Lodge Canongate Kilwinning, No.2, on 4 December 1775.

His friend and fellow Freemason, Robert Burns, made him an honorary member of Lodge St David, Tarbolton, No. 133, on 25 July 1787. This was whilst Stewart was staying at the family seat at Catrine, Ayrshire.

== Death ==
In 1822 he was struck with paralysis, but recovered a fair degree of health, sufficient to enable him to resume his studies. He died in Edinburgh on 11 June 1828, where he was buried in Canongate Churchyard, close to his Edinburgh residence. He is buried in an enclosed vault in the lower section, on its west side.

== Memorials ==
In 1831, and of great public note, a monument was erected by the city on Calton Hill. This is to a design by William Henry Playfair and holds a commanding position in the city skyline, forming one of the city's iconic landmarks.

His memory is also honoured by the "Dugald Stewart Building" (erected 2011) for the University of Edinburgh to house its Philosophy Department, on Charles Street, off George Square.

== Works ==
Stewart as a student in Glasgow wrote an essay on Dreaming. In 1792 he published the first volume of the Elements of the Philosophy of the Human Mind; the second volume appeared in 1814, the third not till 1827. In 1793 he printed a textbook, Outlines of Moral Philosophy, which went through many editions; and in the same year he read before the Royal Society of Edinburgh his Account of the Life and Writings of Adam Smith. Similar memoirs of William Robertson the historian and of Reid were afterwards read before the same body and appear in his published works.

In 1805 Stewart published pamphlets defending John Leslie against the charges of unorthodoxy made by the presbytery of Edinburgh. In 1810 appeared the Philosophical Essays, in 1814 the second volume of the Elements, in 1815 the first part and in 1821 the second part of the "Dissertation" written for the Encyclopædia Britannica Supplement, entitled "A General View of the Progress of Metaphysical, Ethical, and Political Philosophy since the Revival of Letters." In 1827 he published the third volume of the Elements, and in 1828, a few weeks before his death, The Philosophy of the Active and Moral Powers.

Stewart's works were edited in 11 vols. (1854–1858) by Sir William Hamilton and completed with a memoir by John Veitch.

== Influence ==
Among Stewart's pupils were Lord Palmerston, Sir Walter Scott, Francis Jeffrey, Henry Thomas Cockburn, Francis Horner, Sydney Smith, John William Ward, Lord Brougham, Dr. Thomas Brown, James Mill, Sir James Mackintosh and Sir Archibald Alison.

His reputation rested as much on his eloquence, populism, and style as on original work. He was principally responsible for making the "Scottish philosophy" predominant in early 19th-century Europe. In the second half of the century, Stewart's reputation fell to that of a follower of the work of Thomas Reid.

Stewart upheld Reid's psychological method and expounded the Scottish Common Sense Realism, which was attacked by James Mill and John Stuart Mill. Part of his originality lay in his incorporation of elements of moderate empiricism and the French ideologists Laromiguière, Cabanis and Destutt de Tracy. He opposed the argument of ontology, and Condillac's sensationalism. Immanuel Kant, he said, he could not understand.
