= Cyclopædia, or an Universal Dictionary of Arts and Sciences =

1728 British encyclopedia

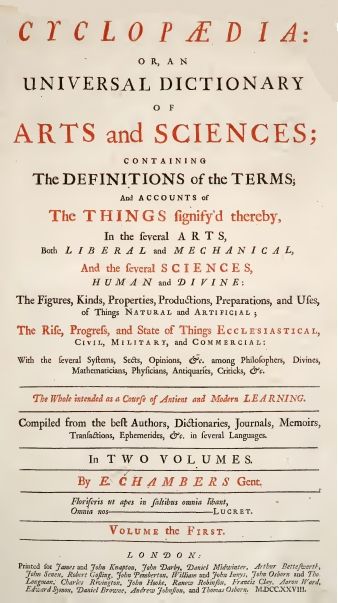
Ephraim Chambers Cyclopædia (1728)

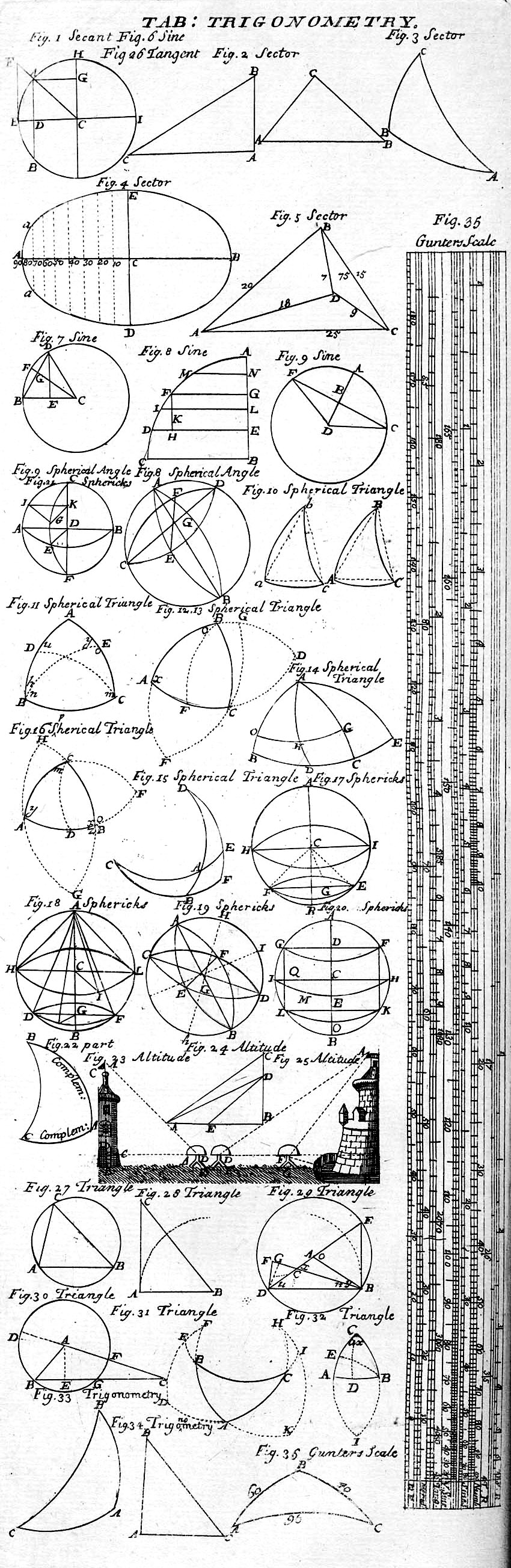
Table of trigonometry, 1728 Cyclopædia

Cyclopædia: or, an Universal Dictionary of Arts and Sciences is a British encyclopedia prepared by Ephraim Chambers and first published in 1728. Six more editions appeared between 1728 and 1751, and there was a Supplement in 1753. The Cyclopædia was one of the first general encyclopedias produced in English.

== Noteworthy features ==
The title page of the first edition summarizes the author’s aims:

Cyclopædia: or, An Universal Dictionary of Arts and Sciences; containing the Definitions of the Terms, and Accounts of the Things ſignify'd thereby, in the several Arts, both Liberal and Mechanical, and the ſeveral Sciences, Human and Divine: the Figures, Kinds, Properties, Productions, Preparations, and Uſes, of Things Natural and Artificial; the Riſe, Progreſs, and State of Things Ecclesiastical, Civil, Military, and Commercial: with the ſeveral Syſtems, Sects, Opinions, &c. among Philoſophers, Divines, Mathematicians, Phyſicians, Antiquaries, Criticks, &c. The Whole intended as a Course of Antient and Modern Learning.

The first edition included numerous cross-references meant to connect articles scattered by the use of alphabetical order, a dedication to the king, George II, and a philosophical preface at the beginning of Volume 1. Among other things, the preface gives an analysis of forty-seven divisions of knowledge, with classed lists of the articles belonging to each, intended to serve as a table of contents and also as a directory indicating the order in which the articles should be read.

== Printing history ==
A second edition appeared in 1738 in two volumes in folio, with 2,466 pages. This edition was supposedly retouched and amended in a thousand places, with a few added articles and some enlarged articles. Chambers was prevented from doing more because booksellers were alarmed by a bill in Parliament containing a clause to oblige publishers of all improved editions of books to print their improvements separately. The bill, after passing the House of Commons, was unexpectedly thrown out by the House of Lords; but fearing that it might be revived, the booksellers thought it best to retreat, though more than twenty sheets had been printed.

Five other editions were published in London from 1739 to 1751–1752. An edition was also published in Dublin in 1742; this and the London editions were all two volumes in folio. An Italian translation appearing in Venice, 1748–1749, 4to, nine volumes, was the first complete Italian encyclopaedia. When Chambers was in France in 1739, he rejected very favorable proposals to publish an edition there dedicated to Louis XV.

Chambers' work was carefully done and popular. However, it had defects and omissions, as he was well aware; by his death on 15 May 1740, he had collected and arranged materials for seven new volumes. George Lewis Scott was employed by the booksellers to select articles for the press and to supply others, but he left before the job was finished. The job was then given to John Hill. The Supplement was published in London in 1753 in two folio volumes with 3307 pages and 12 plates. Hill was a botanist, and the botanical part, which had been weak in the Cyclopaedia, was the best.

Abraham Rees, a nonconformist minister, published a revised and enlarged edition in 1778–1788, with the supplement and improvements incorporated. It was published in London as a folio of five volumes, 5,010 pages ( not paginated), and 159 plates. It was published in 418 numbers at 6d. each. Rees claimed to have added more than 4,400 new articles. At the end, he gave an index of articles, classed under 100 heads, numbering about 57,000 and filling 80 pages. The heads, with 39 cross references, were arranged alphabetically.

== Precursors ==
Among the precursors of Chambers's Cyclopaedia was John Harris's Lexicon Technicum of 1704 (later editions from 1708 to 1744). By its title and content, it was "An Universal English Dictionary of Arts and Sciences: Explaining not only the Terms of Art, but the Arts Themselves." While Harris's work is often classified as a technical dictionary, it also took material from Newton and Halley, among others.

== Successors ==
Chambers's Cyclopaedia in turn became the inspiration for the landmark Encyclopédie of Denis Diderot and Jean le Rond d'Alembert, which owed its inception to a proposed French translation of Chambers's work begun in 1744 by John Mills, assisted by Gottfried Sellius. The later Chambers's Encyclopaedia (1860–1868) had no connection to Ephraim Chambers's work but was the product of Robert Chambers and his brother William.
