= William Bannatyne, Lord Bannatyne =

Scottish advocate, judge, antiquarian and historian (1743–1833)

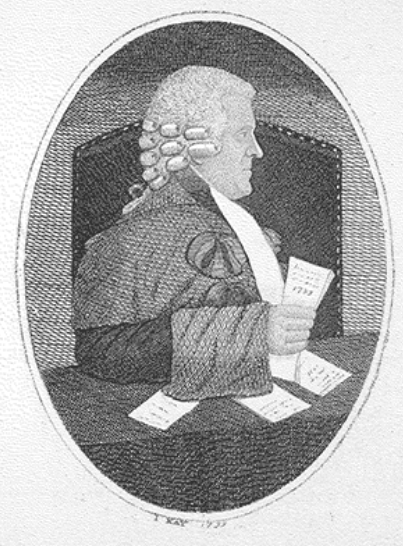
Lord Bannantyne by John Kay

Sir William Macleod Bannatyne, Lord Bannatyne FRSE (26 January 1743 – 30 November 1833) was a distinguished Scottish advocate, judge, antiquarian and historian.

== Life ==
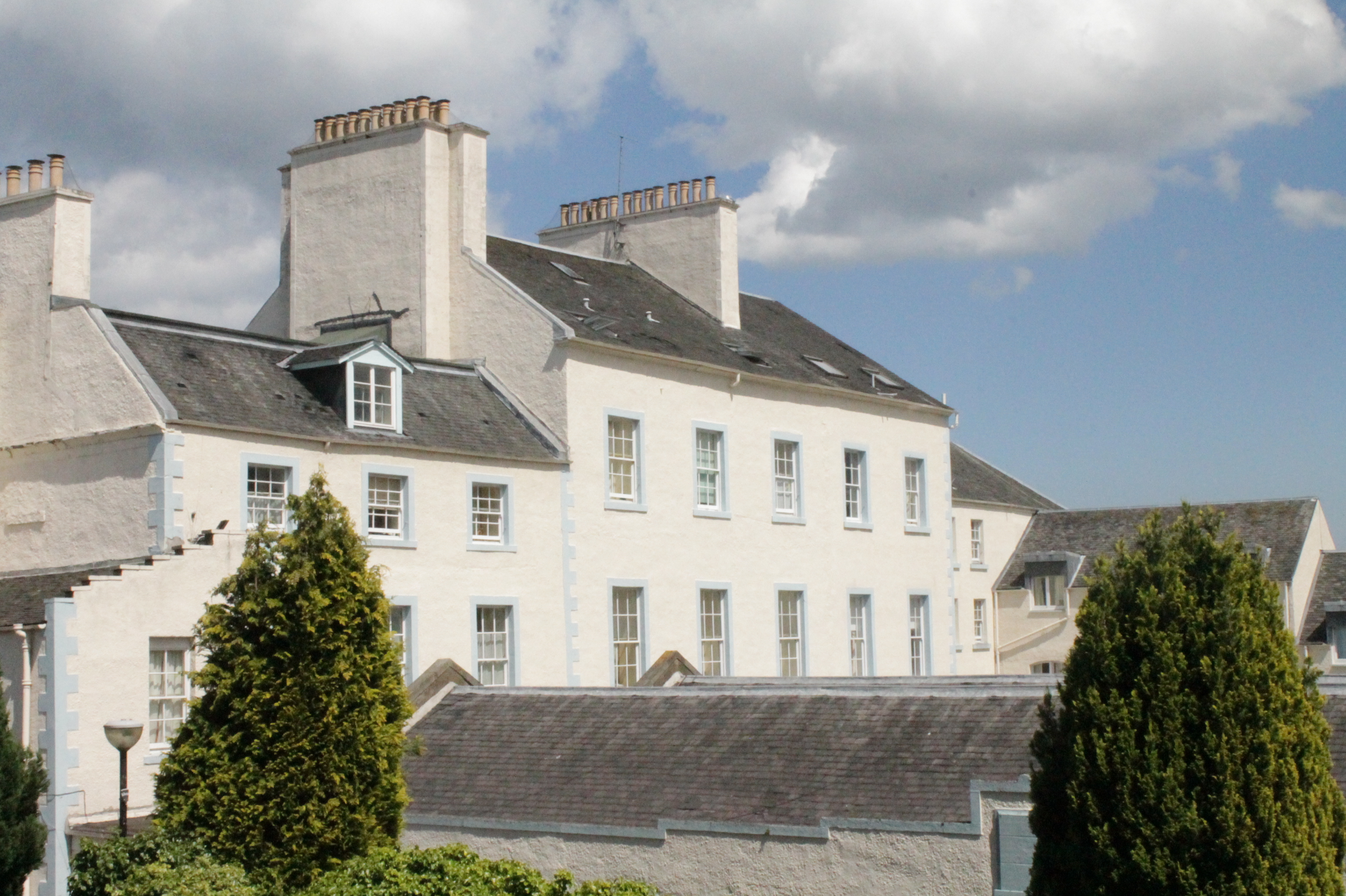
Whitefoord House on the Canongate

The son of Mr. Roderick Macleod WS and Isabel Bannantyne, daughter of Hector Bannatyne of Kames. He received a liberal education, including a period at the High School of Edinburgh (1755-6), and was admitted advocate, 22 January 1765. At this time he lived near the head of Craig's Close on the north side of the Royal Mile in Edinburgh, close to the Law Courts.

He was appointed Sheriff of Bute in 1776. On the death of Lord Swinton, in 1799, he was promoted to the bench as a Senator of the College of Justice, and took his seat as Lord Bannatyne.

Among his intimate friends were Henry Mackenzie, Robert Cullen, William Craig, Hugh Blair, Erskine and Alexander Abercromby. He was a contributor both the Mirror and Lounger magazines, at the end of the eighteenth century.

In 1784 he was a co-founder of the Highland Society.

He assumed the surname of Bannatyne when he succeeded, through his mother to the estate of Kames in the Isle of Bute. He extended Kames Castle by the addition of a fine mansion house in the early eighteenth century. He sold the Kames estate in 1812 to James Hamilton, and moved to Edinburgh.

He retired in 1823, when he was knighted and also became a member of the Bannatyne Club in the same year. He died at his home, Whitefoord House on the Canongate section of the Royal Mile in Edinburgh in 1833. He is buried in Greyfriars Kirkyard in the centre of Edinburgh.

He collected a library of historical, genealogical, and antiquarian works, and at its sale in 1834, a set of the Bannatyne publications was purchased for Sir John Hay, Baronet of Smithfield and Haystown, for one hundred and sixty-eight pounds sterling.

== See also ==
- Bannatyne manuscript (Clan MacLeod), attributed to William Bannatyne, Lord Bannatyne
