= Matthew Stewart (British Army officer) =

Scottish colonel and army officer

Colonel Matthew Stewart FRSE (1784–1851) was son of Dugald Stewart and a 19th-century Scottish army officer.

== Life ==
He was born in 1784 the son of the famous philosopher Dugald Stewart and grandson of Matthew Stewart. His mother was Dugald Stewart's first wife, Helen Bannantyne. The family lived at Lothian House at the foot of the Canongate, near Holyrood Palace.

In 1804 he joined the Royal Engineers. In 1807 he became Aide-de-camp to Sir Gilbert Elliot whilst the latter served as Governor-General of India. He was then promoted to Lt Colonel in 1824 and served in Portugal for some time. In 1837 he became Brevet Colonel to the 42nd Regiment (Black Watch).

In 1820 he was elected a Fellow of the Royal Society of Edinburgh. His proposers were William Archibald Cadell, William Wallace, and James Jardine. He was also a member of The Speculative Society of Edinburgh.

He died on 29 May 1851.

== Artistic recognition ==
His portrait by Thomas Heaphy is held by the Scottish National Portrait Gallery but is rarely displayed.
