= Ephraim Chambers =

English writer and encyclopaedist (c. 1680–1740)

- Born: c. 1680 Kendal, Westmorland, England
- Died: 15 May 1740 (aged 59–60) Islington, England
- Occupation: Encyclopaedist, publisher
- Genre: Non-fiction

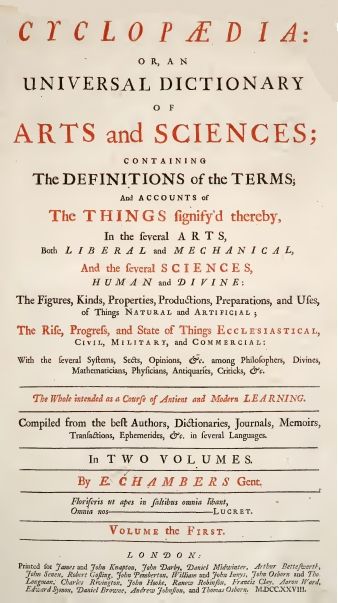
Title page of Chambers' 1728 Cyclopaedia, or an Universal Dictionary of Arts and Sciences

Ephraim Chambers (c. 1680 – 15 May 1740) was an English writer and encyclopaedist, who is primarily known for producing the Cyclopaedia, or an Universal Dictionary of Arts and Sciences. Chambers' Cyclopædia is known as the original source material for the French Encyclopédie that started off as a translation of Cyclopædia.

== Biography ==
Chambers was born in Milton near Kendal, Westmorland, England. Little is known of his early life but he attended Heversham Grammar School, then was apprenticed to a globe maker, John Senex, in London from 1714 to 1721. It was here that he developed the plan of the Cyclopaedia, or an Universal Dictionary of Arts and Sciences. After beginning the Cyclopaedia, he left Senex's service and devoted himself entirely to the encyclopedia project. He also took lodging in Gray's Inn, where he remained for the rest of his life. Chambers died in Canonbury House in Islington and was buried in the cloisters of Westminster Abbey.

== Writing ==
The first edition of the Cyclopaedia appeared by subscription in 1728 and was dedicated to George II, King of Great Britain. When he died in 1740, he left materials for a Supplement; edited by George Lewis Scott, this was published in 1753.

He also wrote for, and possibly edited, the Literary Magazine (1735–1736), which mainly published book reviews. Chambers worked on translating other works in French on perspective and chemistry from 1726 to 1727, including the Practice of Perspective from the French of Jean Dubreuil. He also worked with John Martyn to translate the History and Memoirs of the Royal Academy of Sciences at Paris (1742).

== Legacy ==
Chambers' epitaph, written by himself, was published in both the original Latin and in English in the Gentleman's Magazine, volume 10, as follows (translation is the original):

Multis pervulgatus
paucis notus
Qui vitam inter lucem et umbram
Nec eruditus nec idiota
Literis deditus transegit, sed ut homo
Qui humani nihil a se alienum putat
Vita simul et laboribus functus
Hic requiescere voluit
EPHRAIM CHAMBERS.

In English thus:

Heard of by many,
Known to few,
Who led a Life between Fame and Obscurity
Neither abounding nor deficient in Learning
Devoted to Study, but as a Man
Who thinks himself bound to all Offices of Humanity,
Having finished his Life and Labours together,
Here desires to rest
EPHRAIM CHAMBERS.

The Encyclopédie of Diderot and d'Alembert owed its inception to a French translation of Chambers's work.

== See also ==
- Chambers's Encyclopaedia – a work by different authors
