= Whitefoord baronets =

Extinct baronetcy in the Baronetage of Nova Scotia

- Escutcheon of the Whitefoord baronets of Blairquhan
- Creation date: 1701
- Status: extinct
- Seat: Blairquhan Castle

The Whitefoord baronetcy, of Blairquhan in the County of Ayr, was a title in the Baronetage of Nova Scotia. It was created on 30 December 1701 for Adam Whitefoord. According to Cokayne, the title became dormant on the death of the third Baronet in 1803. Absent from the Official Roll of the Baronetage, the title is now extinct.

They built Whitefoord House on the Canongate in Edinburgh which still survives.

== Whitefoord baronets, of Blairquhan (1701) ==
- Sir Adam Whitefoord, 1st Baronet (died 1727)
- Sir John Whitefoord, 2nd Baronet (c. 1701–1763)
- Sir John Whitefoord, 3rd Baronet (c. 1730–1803)
