= Siege of Fort William =

Siege in 1746

- Part of the Jacobite rising of 1745
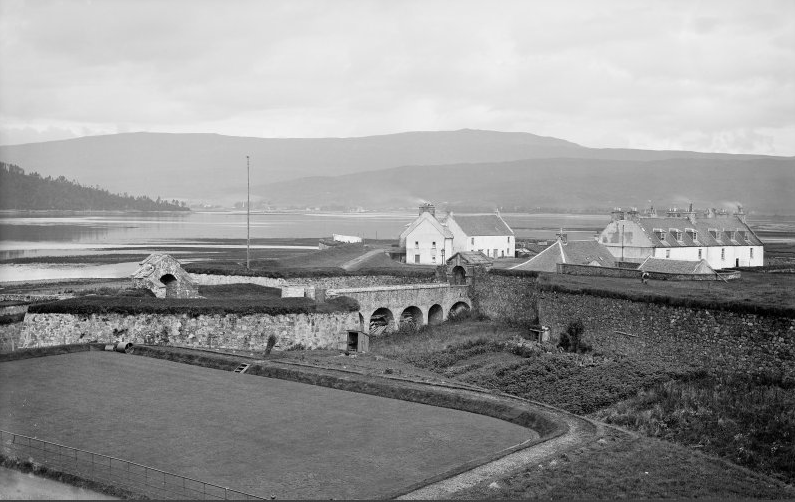
- Photo taken by Erskine Beveridge in 1883 of the old fort at Fort William, Scotland, before it was demolished
Date	20 March to 3 April 1746
Location	Fort William, Scotland 56.8214°N 5.1077°W
Result	British Government victory

Belligerents
Great Britain	Jacobites; France

Commanders and leaders
(Kingdom of Great Britain) Captain Scott (Kingdom of Great Britain) Alexander Campbell	(Kingdom of France) Colonel Stapleton (Kingdom of France) Mirabel de Gordon; Lochiel; MacDonald of Keppoch

Strength
400	Estimated 1,000
- Location within Scotland

The siege of Fort William took place in the Scottish Highlands during the 1745 Jacobite Rising, from 20 March to 3 April 1746.

On 1 February 1746, the Jacobites abandoned the siege of Stirling Castle and withdrew to Inverness to wait for spring. This period was used to reduce government strongpoints in the Highlands, including Blair Castle and Fort Augustus; after its surrender on 1 March, they moved onto Fort William.

Advance elements of the Jacobite force arrived outside the fort on 8 March; operations began on 20 March but made little progress. When the Duke of Cumberland and his army left Aberdeen in early April, the besiegers were recalled to Inverness and the siege abandoned.

== Background ==
After the Jacobite rising of 1715, a line of forts was built along what is now the Caledonian Canal, the most important being Fort George, Inverness, Fort Augustus and Fort William. The garrisons were reinforced when the 1745 Rising began but the defences had been neglected and were in a poor state. It was not until the Jacobites retreated from Stirling Castle in February 1746 that a serious effort was made to capture them.

The capture of Fort Augustus on 1 March left Fort William as the last government-controlled position in the Great Glen. On 5 March, an engineer named Russell arrived to inspect the defences and after making some improvements, he reported it should easily be held. The current governor Alexander Campbell was a "careful and good man", but there were doubts about his competence; on 15 March 1746, he was replaced by Captain Caroline Frederick Scott of Guise's Regiment.

The garrison totalled around 400 men; two companies from Guise's, two from Johnson's and one from the Campbell of Argyll Militia. A well-built, modern position, its triangular shape was designed to use the head of Loch Linnhe as cover; it had six 12-pounder cannon, eight 6-pounders, seven smaller pieces, two 13-inch mortars and eight coehorns, with plenty of ammunition. Additional firepower was provided by the sloop of war Baltimore and the Serpent, a bomb vessel; this made it a formidable target, its only weakness being lack of a permanent water supply.

On 25 February 1746, the garrison began demolishing buildings in the nearby village of Maryburgh to provide a clear field of fire, although they could not prevent the besiegers occupying the surrounding heights. The Jacobite force from Fort Augustus consisted of 150 French regulars under Colonel Stapleton, plus clansmen led by Lochiel and MacDonald of Keppoch.

== Siege ==
The Jacobites blockaded Loch Linnhe at the Corran Narrows, capturing one of Baltimore's boats and threatening to cut connection between the garrison and the outside world. Alexander Campbell quickly responded and early on 4 March, sent three boats with 71 men to the Narrows from Fort William. They surprised the Jacobite sentries, reportedly killing two men and wounding many others, burning houses and boats.

Campbell militia under Argyll destroyed property and livestock in the surrounding area, denying supplies to the Jacobites but also putting pressure on Cameron and MacDonald clansmen to defend their lands. Lochiel and Keppoch wrote to Prince Charles, asking him to sanction reprisals against Clan Campbell and promising to hang one Campbell for every house destroyed.

Unlike Fort Augustus, Fort William was a well-designed, modern position; control of the sea meant it could easily be reinforced, while Serpent and Baltimore gave the garrison more firepower than the besiegers. Stapleton considered it too strong for the Jacobites to take and Cumberland apparently considered it a way of diverting Jacobite resources. Charles and his senior Scots commander Lord George Murray agreed with Stapleton but Lochiel and Keppoch insisted, due to the damage caused to their lands by the garrison.

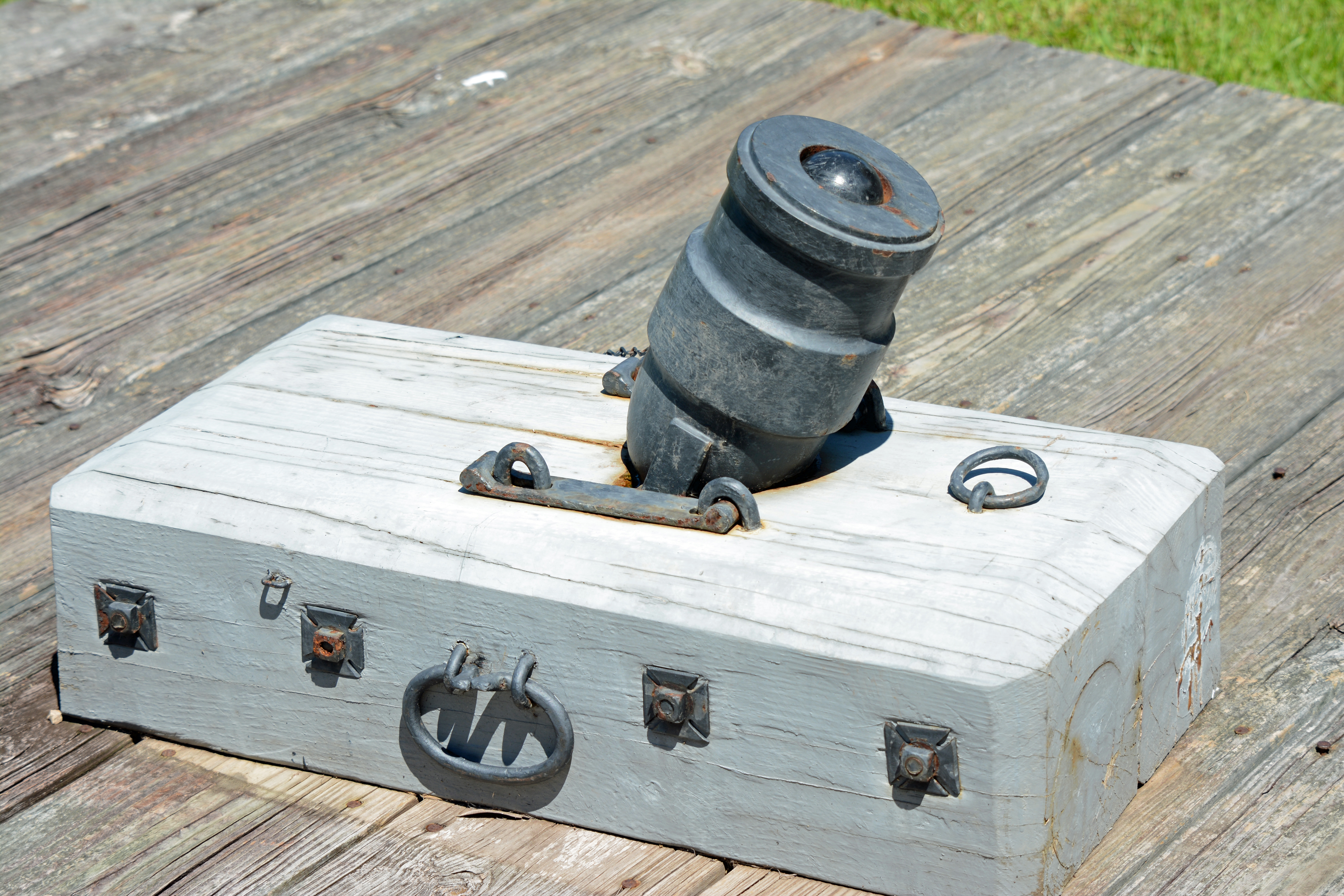
Replica of Coehorn mortar; designed for use against infantry, these made little impact on Fort William

Stapleton arrived outside the fort on 8 March with the French regulars, followed by Scott on 15th aboard Serpent. The garrison began firing on the Jacobites as they constructed gun positions and one shot injured Grant, the engineer in charge at Fort Augustus. He was replaced by Mirabel de Gordon, whose performance at Stirling was regarded as so incompetent, some suspected he had been bribed. The besiegers opened fire on 20 March but poor roads and lack of horses to pull them meant the heavy guns remained at Inverness; the light guns and mortars available made minimal impression on the walls.

In accordance with then prevailing rules of war, the garrison was summoned to surrender on 22 March; unsurprisingly, Scott refused, telling them he would defend the place to 'the last extremity'. It was now clear the Jacobite gun positions on Sugar Loaf Hill and Cow Hill were poorly sited and a new position had to be built higher up Cow Hill. Although the 6-inch guns apparently caused some concern, Scott's counter-battery fire proved effective; clear, moonlit nights prevented the Jacobites getting close without being seen and the only opportunity for combat was when water parties left the fort.

As at Stirling and Carlisle, the Highlanders were not suited to lengthy siege operations, while Baltimore continued to land raiding parties up and down the loch. Frustration at being unable to protect their lands led to disputes between the Camerons and MacDonalds, and also with the French troops who did most of the construction work. On 27 March, a new battery of four 6-pounder guns above the Governor's garden opened fire but the strength of the exterior walls meant the focus shifted to making the interior untenable. On 28th, artillery on the eastern side opened up using heated shot, together with grapeshot, old nails and red-hot lengths of notched iron intended to lodge in the timbers.

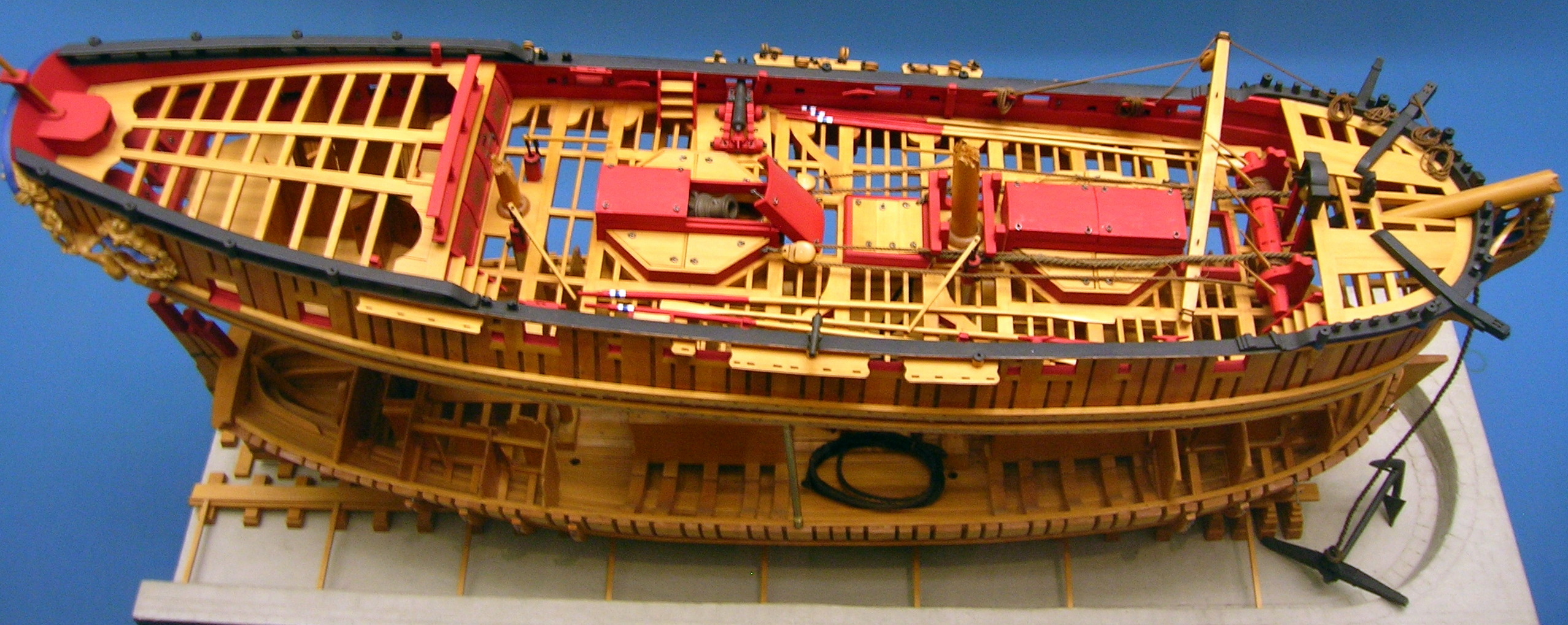
Bomb vessel, similar to the 'Serpent'; equipped with large fixed mortars, this provided considerable additional firepower for the garrison

While this caused substantial damage to the roof and upper works, the fort was otherwise untouched. On the night of 31 March, Scott sent out 150 men to destroy the Jacobite battery; timed to occur when the guard was being relieved, it was left unprotected at the crucial moment. The attackers captured or spiked four 6-inch mortars along with three 4-pounder and one 6-pounder cannon. They then attacked the battery above the Governor's garden but lacking the element of surprise were repulsed. Reinforced by Scott, the assault party returned safely to the fort; casualties were estimated as eleven or twelve on each side.

After two weeks, the siege had made little progress and with Cumberland preparing to leave Aberdeen, Prince Charles needed all available men. The Jacobites were ordered back to Inverness, taking only what they could easily carry; on 3 April, the garrison discovered they had gone, leaving guns and heavy equipment behind.

== Aftermath ==
In the aftermath of the siege, the Baltimore and Terror were employed intercepting French supply ships and preventing clansmen in the Western Highlands and Islands reinforcing the main Jacobite army. In the repression that followed Culloden, Scott conducted the search for Prince Charles, gaining a reputation for brutality; most of the stories lack witnesses but he appears to have actively disliked Highlanders. He transferred to the East India Company in 1752 and died of fever in Calcutta, modern Kolkata.

After the Rising, a number of modifications were made to the fort's defences, including a moat on the landward side and strengthening of the ramparts. The fort was manned until 1854, primarily to deter smugglers, then decommissioned in 1864 and sold to the West Highland Railway.

== Sources ==
- Boyse, Samuel (1748). An impartial history of the late rebellion in 1745. From authentic memoirs, etc. Edward and John Exshaw, Dublin.
- Clark, GN (1922). "The Highland Forts in the 45". The English Historical Review. 37.
- Duffy, Christopher (2007). The '45: Bonnie Prince Charlie and the untold story of the Jacobite Rising. WN. ISBN 978-0753822623.
- Miers, Mary (2008). Mckean, Charlotte (ed.). The Western Seaboard: An Illustrated Architectural Guide (RIAS Series of Illustrated Architectural Guides to Scotland). Rias Publishing. ISBN 978-1873190296.
- Pollard, Tony (2009). Bastions and Barbed Wire: Studies in the Archaeology of Conflict (Journal of Conflict Archaeology). Brill. ISBN 978-9004173606.
- Royle, Trevor (2016). Culloden; Scotland's Last Battle and the Forging of the British Empire. Little, Brown. ISBN 978-1408704011.
