= Longuerre's theorem =

In mathematics, particularly in Euclidean geometry, Longuerre's theorem is a result concerning the collinearity of points constructed from a cyclic quadrilateral. It is a generalization of the Simson line, which states that the three projections of a point on the circumcircle of a triangle to its sides are collinear.

== Statement ==
Longuerre's theorem. Let $A_1A_2A_3A_4$ be a cyclic quadrilateral, and let $P$ be an arbitrary point. For each triple of vertices, construct the Simson line of $P$ with respect to that triangle. Let $D_i$ be the projection of $P$ onto the Simson line corresponding to the triangle formed by omitting vertex $A_i$. Then the four points $D_1, D_2, D_3, D_4$ are collinear.

Longuerre's theorem can be generalized to cyclic $n$-gons.

== See also ==
- Polar coordinates
- Simson line
