= James Williamson (mathematician) =

Scottish minister and mathematician

James Williamson FRSE (1725–1795) was a Scottish minister and mathematician, and joint founder of the Royal Society of Edinburgh.

== Life ==
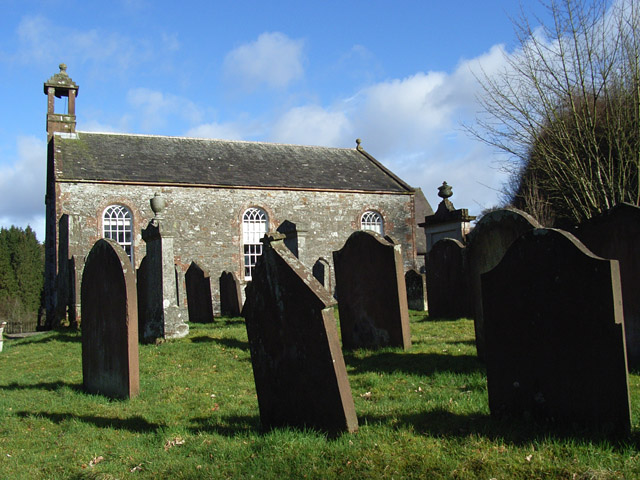
Wamphray church

He was born in Dumfriesshire in 1725 the son of James Williamson of Tynron.

He studied Mathematics at Glasgow University under Robert Simson. His theological training is unclear but he was licensed to preach by the Church of Scotland in 1752. He was ordained at Wamphray church in 1755 and translated to Closeburn in 1757. In 1761 he was appointed Professor of Mathematics at Glasgow University in succession to his mentor Prof Simson.

In 1783 he was one of the founders of the Royal Society of Edinburgh.

He retired in 1789 and appointed Prof James Millar as his successor. He died in his college house in Glasgow on 3 June 1795.
