= Caroline Frederick Scott =

Scottish soldier (c. 1711–1754)

Lt-Colonel Caroline Frederick Scott
- Born: c. 1711; Dresden
- Died: 12 May 1754 (aged 42–43); Madras, now Chennai, Tamil Nadu
- Relatives: George Lewis Scott 1708–1780 (brother); James Stewart 1681–1727 (uncle); James Steuart 1707–1780 (cousin)
- Military career
- Allegiance: Great Britain
- Branch: British Army
- Service years: 1737–1754
- Rank: Lieutenant-Colonel
- Unit: 29th, later Worcestershire Regiment 1749–1752
- Commands: Garrison commander, Fort William, March–August 1746; Engineer-General, East India Company 1752–1754; Major Commandant, Fort William, Calcutta
- Conflicts: War of Jenkins' Ear; Cartagena de Indias; War of the Austrian Succession; Jacobite rising of 1745; Siege of Fort William

Lieutenant-Colonel Caroline Frederick Scott (c. 1711 – 12 May 1754) was a Scottish soldier and military engineer who served in the British Army before transferring to the East India Company.

During the 1745 Jacobite Rising, he successfully defended Fort William in March 1746 and later conducted the search for Prince Charles after Culloden in April. He gained a reputation for atrocities and reprisals against Highlanders and has been described as one of the most notorious 'Redcoats' of the Rebellion.

In October 1752, he transferred to the East India Company as Engineer General of their settlements in India, based in Calcutta, modern Kolkata; he died of fever in Madras, modern Chennai, on 12 May 1754.

== Life ==
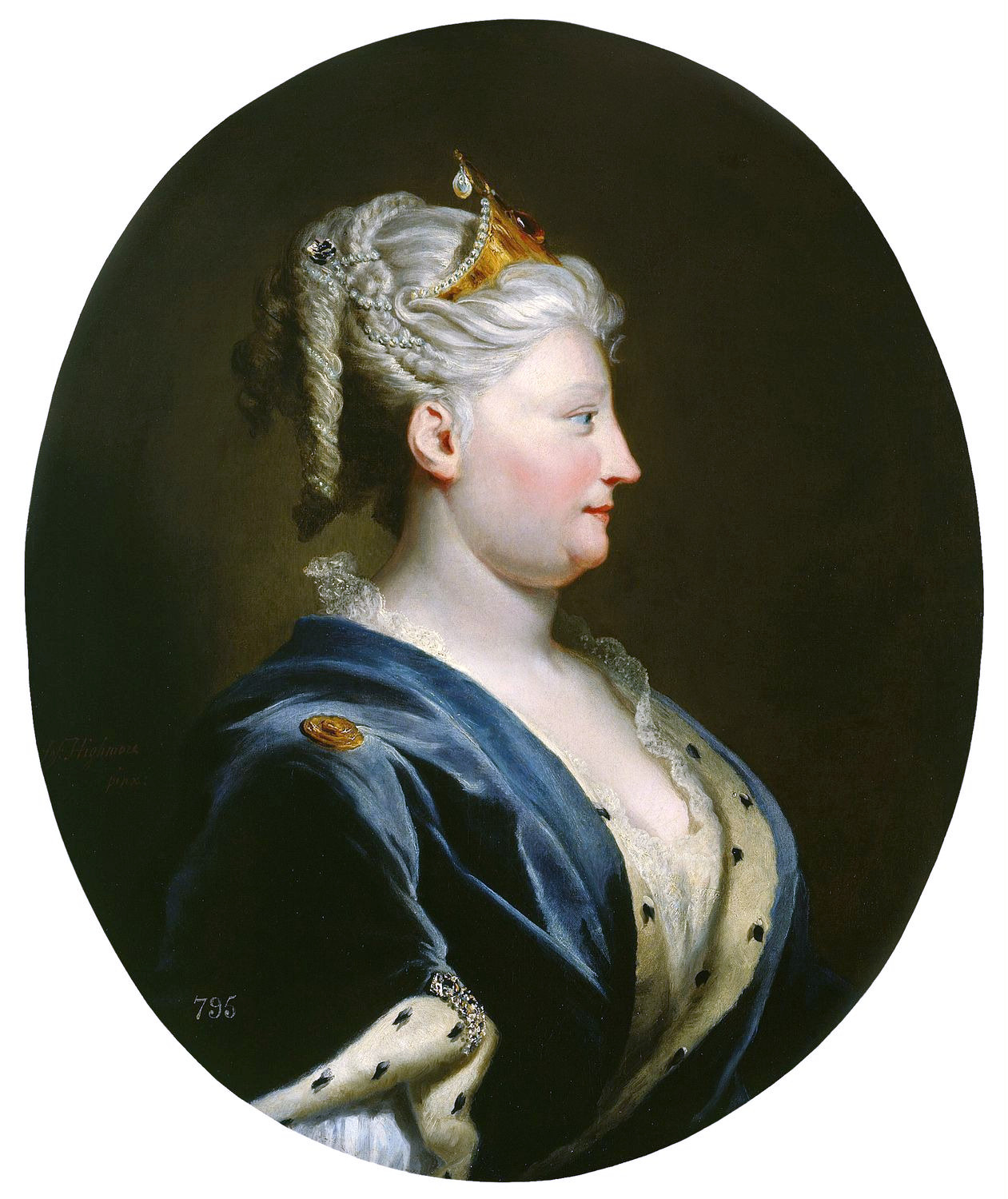
Scott was named after his godmother, Caroline of Ansbach (1683–1737), mother of the Duke of Cumberland

Caroline Frederick Scott was born in 1711, one of three sons of James (or George) Scott and Marion Stewart (1679–1727), daughter of Sir James Stewart (1635–1715). A Presbyterian radical sentenced to death for his role in the 1685 Argyll's Rising, Sir James was appointed Lord Advocate of Scotland in 1692; his son, also named James, was Solicitor General.

Originally from Edinburgh, James Scott was a close friend of George I, then Elector Hanover and between 1710 and 1724 held senior diplomatic posts at various German courts. Hanover's involvement in the Great Northern War made this an extremely sensitive and important position and James was closely involved in negotiations to end it. After her husband died in 1726, Marion moved to the Dutch Republic, so her children could attend Leiden University.

Scott's unusual first name came from his godmother Caroline of Ansbach (1683-1737), wife of George II and mother of the Duke of Cumberland. Relationships and loyalties were very complex; political Whigs, both Stewarts opposed the 1707 Union, while Scott's cousin, the economist James Steuart, was exiled for his part in the 1745 rebellion. His elder brother George (1708–1780) was appointed tutor to the future George III, on the recommendation of former Jacobite minister Viscount Bolingbroke.

Scott never married but left his property to Martha Bowdler, who is assumed to be mother of his four children, three girls and a boy, also named Caroline Frederick (ca 1752–1794). Little is known of his daughters; his son served in the Royal Artillery, was invalided out in 1793 and died in Rochester in 1794.

== Career ==
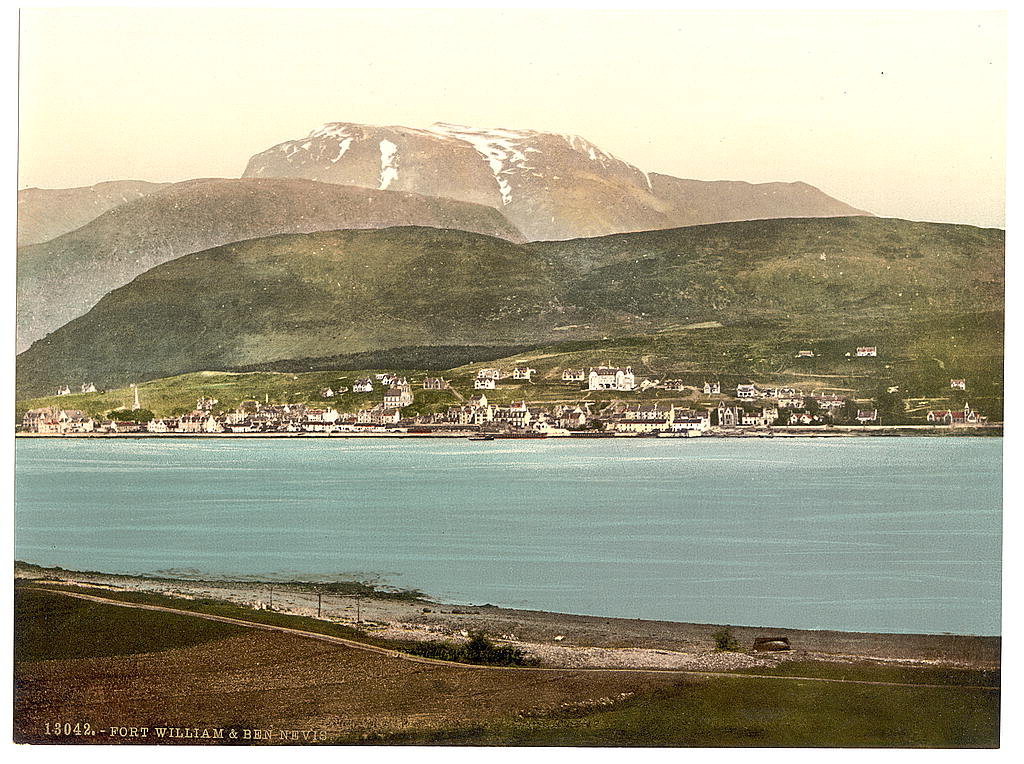
Fort William, foreground, Ben Nevis behind ca 1890

In 1737, Scott was commissioned as a cornet in the Royal North British Dragoons, then based in England, before transferring to Guise's Regiment in 1741. During the 1739 to 1748 War of Jenkins' Ear with Spain, Guise's was sent to the West Indies where it took part in the attack of May 1741 on Cartagena de Indias. The expedition was a disaster, the assault force suffering losses of between 80 and 90%, mostly from dysentery and yellow fever. The survivors returned to England in December 1742; the unit was brought up to strength as a result of the 1740-1748 War of the Austrian Succession, then sent to Scotland for garrison duties.

Although technically an officer of Guise's, Scott served in Gibraltar as a military engineer under the Earl of Albemarle and when the 1745 Rising began, he was in Flanders with Cumberland. In July, detachments from Guise's secured the forts between Inverness and Fort William; two companies were captured at the Battle of Prestonpans in September, some of whom changed sides and were later executed as deserters. A letter written by his brother George mentions Scott was among the troops sent to Scotland after Prestonpans.

After withdrawing to Inverness in February 1746, the Jacobites captured Fort Augustus in early March, leaving Fort William as the last government-controlled position in the Great Glen. Cumberland appointed Scott commander and he arrived there on 15 March; like Fort Augustus, its defences had been neglected but it was far stronger and better sited. Control of the sea meant it could be resupplied, while naval vessels moored in Loch Linnhe gave the defenders more firepower than the besiegers. Jacobite commander Colonel Stapleton considered the position too strong to be taken with the forces available. Scott's diaries show he conducted an energetic and aggressive defence and the siege made little progress. At the end of March, Stapleton was ordered back to Inverness and on 3 April, the garrison discovered the Jacobites had gone, leaving guns and heavy equipment behind. Scott's defence was praised by the Duke of Newcastle in a letter to Cumberland on 17 April.

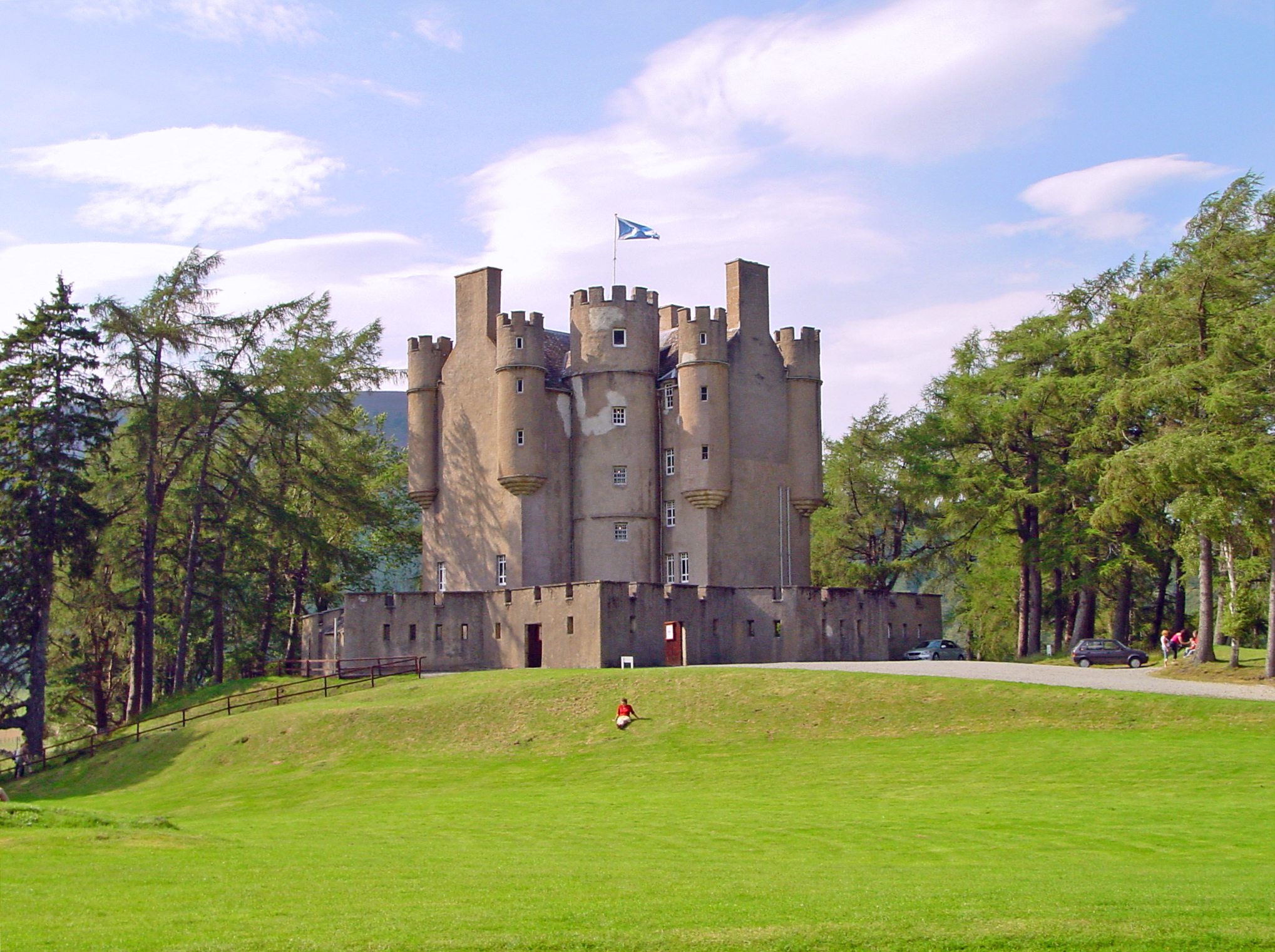
Braemar Castle, one of the strongpoints established to control the Highlands; Scott commanded here until the end of 1749

Following the Battle of Culloden on 16 April, Scott led one of the parties searching for Prince Charles; on 21 June, he landed at Kilbride, on Skye, only just missing the Prince who was two miles away. In the course of this, he gained a reputation for brutality and excess; many stories about him were recorded by the antiquarian Alexander Carmichael in the 1860s. One alleges three Highlanders who surrendered to him were drowned in a mill flume at Lochoy, although there is no direct confirmation of this.

In 2011, Scott was included on a list of alleged war criminals by a group seeking an apology for crimes committed after Culloden. Why he remains so notorious is unclear, since destruction and theft of property and livestock was common practice on both sides. The repression that followed Culloden reflected a widespread mood in the army and was conducted by senior commanders like James Wolfe, Henry Hawley and John Huske. Colonel Whitefoord, Sir Walter Scott's model for the heroic Hanoverian Colonel Talbot in Waverley, wrote suspected rebels were 'immediately put to death...their houses plundered and burnt, cattle drove, ploughs and tackle destroyed.' One reason for this was a widespread perception among government officials and Jacobites another landing was imminent.

However, Scott clearly had a strong dislike of Highlanders and Jacobites, as demonstrated by his treatment of Isabel Haldane. Her husband was Charles Stewart of Ardshiel, who led the Stewart of Appin regiment at Culloden and was exiled as a result. In a letter of complaint to John Campbell, Earl of Loudon, Isabel records Scott's men cut down her fruit trees, removed her furniture, food stores and livestock. They also dismantled her house, the materials later being sold at Fort William for £400.

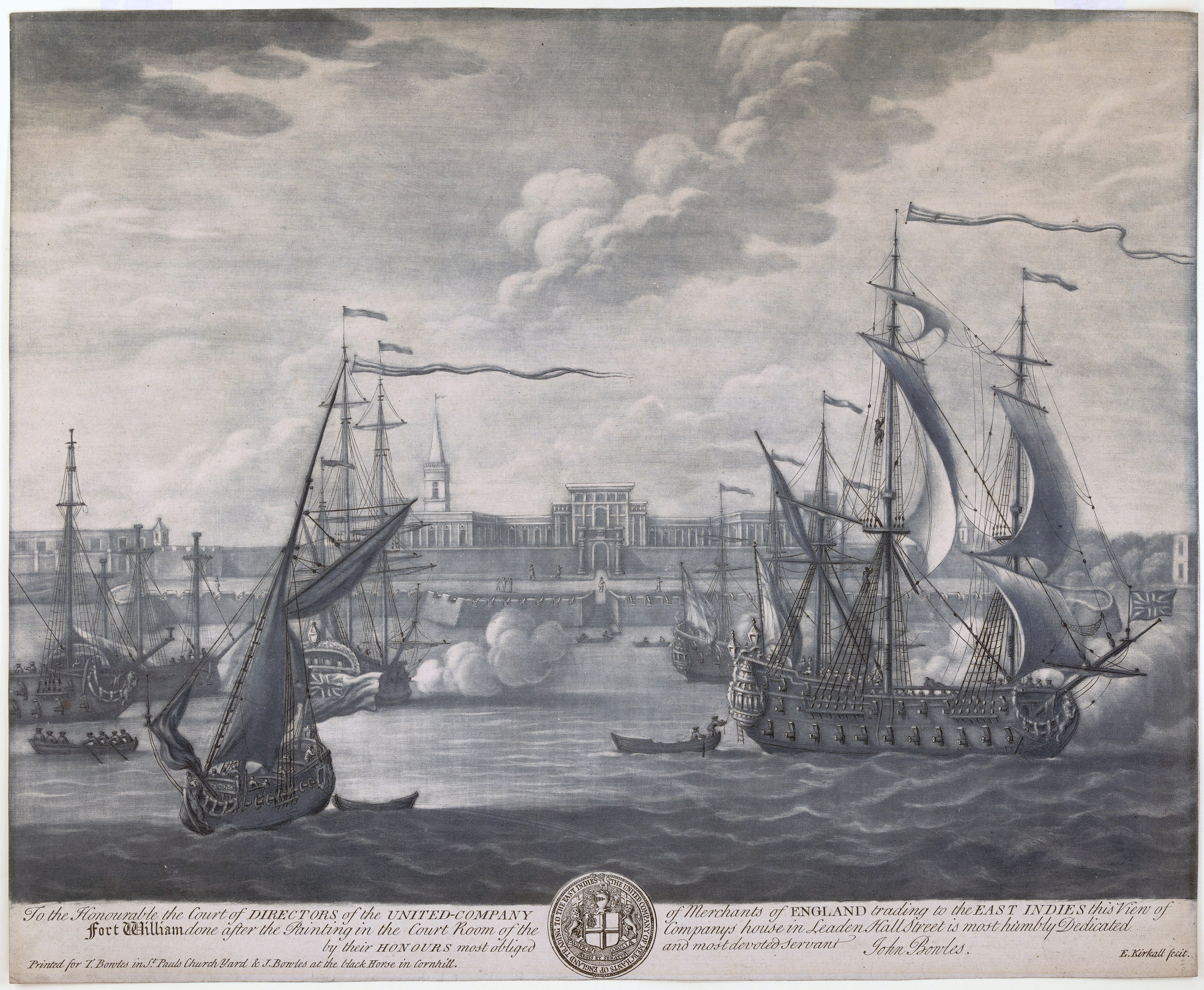
Fort William, Calcutta, ca 1735; Scott drew up plans for improving it but died before they were implemented

In November 1746, Scott was promoted major, replacing his colleague Hugh Wentworth, dismissed for surrendering Fort Augustus. Albemarle was appointed Commander-in-Chief, Scotland and supervised actions taken to control the Highlands. After the Rising, the military road network begun in 1715 was completed and garrisons placed at key points, the main ones being Inversnaid and Braemar Castle, commanded by Scott. As well as regular patrolling, they enforced the Disarming Act, permitting the confiscation of weapons, and the Dress Act, banning Highland dress unless worn on military service. Reports submitted by Scott record weapons found and arrests of those in 'Highland dress'; the latter caused considerable frustration, since local law officers routinely accepted claims by defendants they were simply 'dyed blankets'. He was relieved at the end of October 1749.

Shortly afterwards, he transferred to the 29th Foot, which had just returned to Ireland from Nova Scotia; by 1751, he was a Lieutenant-Colonel, based in Philipstown, now Daingean. The poor performance of the British military in the War of the Austrian Succession resulted in a focus on army reform; under the name 'Mr Lovetruth', Scott published a number of letters on the topic.

In October 1752, Scott joined the military service of the East India Company and appointed Engineer-General for all their settlements in India and Major Commandant of Fort William, Calcutta. He reached Calcutta in September 1753, where he began construction of new gunpowder mills and drew up detailed plans for improving Fort William's fortifications. He died of fever on 12 May 1754 visiting Madras, now Chennai; the works were still in progress when Fort William was captured in 1756. Ensign Scott, who accompanied him from England and is assumed to be a relative, was taken prisoner and died in what is known as the Black Hole of Calcutta.

== Sources ==
- Allardyce, James (1895). Historical papers relating to the Jacobite period, 1699–1750. Vol. 2. Printed for the New Spalding Club.
- Anderson, BJ, ed. (1902). The Albemarle papers; being the correspondence of William Anne, second earl of Albemarle, commander-in-chief in Scotland, 1746–1747. Aberdeen University.
- Beisner, E Calvin (2004). Stewart [Steuart], Sir James, of Goodtrees (Online ed.). Oxford DNB.
- Cannon, Richard (1829). History of the Sixth or Royal First Warwickshire Regiment of Foot. Longman, Orme & Co.
- Courtney, WP (2004). Scott, George Lewis (1708–1780) (2011 ed.). Oxford DNB.
- Craig, Maggie (2011). Bare-Arsed Banditti: The Men of the '45. Random House. ISBN 978-1-84596-970-7.
- Duffy, Christopher. (2007). The '45, Bonnie Prince Charlie and Untold Story of the Jacobite Rising. ISBN 978-0-7538-2262-3
- Everard, Hugh (1891). History of Thomas Farrington's Regiment: Subsequently designated the 29th (Worcestershire) Foot 1694–1881. Littlebury and Company.
- Guy, Alan James (1986). Economy and Discipline: Officership and the British Army, 1714–63. Manchester University Press. ISBN 978-0-7190-1099-6.
- Harbron, John D (1998). Trafalgar and the Spanish Navy The Spanish Experience of Sea Power (2004 ed.). Conway Maritime Press. ISBN 978-0-85177-477-0.
- Horn, DB (1932). British Diplomatic Representatives; 1689-1789 Volume XLVI. Royal Historical Society.
- Preeble, John (1973). Culloden (2002 ed.). Pimlico. ISBN 978-0-7126-6820-0.
- Riding, Jacqueline (2016). Jacobites: A New History of the 45 Rebellion. Bloomsbury. ISBN 978-1-4088-1912-8.
- Royle, Trevor (2016). Culloden; Scotland's Last Battle and the Forging of the British Empire. Little, Brown. ISBN 978-1-4087-0401-1.
- Wilson, CR, ed. (1906). Indian Record Series; Old Fort William in Bengal; Volume II. John Murray.
- Young, H.A (1937). The East India Company's Arsenals & Manufactories (2012 ed.). Naval and Military Press.
