= Serra (surname) =

Serra (Latin: [ˈsɛrra], Italian: [ˈsɛrra], Portuguese: [ˈsɛʁɐ], Catalan: [ˈsɛrə, ˈsɛra], Sardinian: [ˈsɛra]) is Latin for "saw" (a view from a high place, or a saw, see serrated), Italian for "greenhouse", and Sardinian, Galician, Portuguese and Catalan for "mountain range" or "saw". Notable people with the surname include:

== A ==
- Achille Serra, Italian politician
- Achille Serra, Italian architect
- Adriana Serra (1923–1995), Italian film actress
- Adriana Serra Zanetti (born 1976), Italian tennis player
- Agustín José Bernaus y Serra (1863–1930), Spanish bishop
- Albert Serra (born 1975), Spanish independent filmmaker
- Albert Serra (born 1978), Spanish footballer
- Alberto Serra (1870–1912), Spanish football pioneer and sports journalist
- Alfons Serra (born 1990), Spanish footballer
- Angel Serra (born 1951), Cuban rower
- Anna Serra (born 1968), Catalan long-distance runner
- Antonella Serra Zanetti (born 1980), Italian tennis player
- Antoni Arabí i Serra (born 1953), Spanish football player
- Antoni Serra Serra (1708–1755), Spanish religious writer
- Antonio Serra (born 1963), Italian comics writer
- Antonio Serra, Italian philosopher and economist
- Antonius Serra (1610–1669), Greek prelate

== B ==
- Barbara Serra (born 1974), British journalist
- Brampoque Serra Silva Sá (born 1996), known as Brash, Guinea-Bissauan footballer

== C ==
- Carlo Zendo Tetsugen Serra (born 1953), Italian missionary Soto Zen master
- Chico Serra (born 1957), Brazilian racing driver
- Clara Serra (born 1982), Spanish politician and feminist author
- Corinne Serra Tosio (born 1965), French sports shooter
- Cristoforo Serra (1600–1689), Italian painter

== D ==
- Daniel Serra (born 1984), Brazilian auto racing driver
- Diana Serra Cary (1918–2020), known as Baby Peggy Montgomery, American child actress
- Domenico Serra (1899–1965), Italian actor

== E ==
- Eduardo Serra (1943–2025), Portuguese cinematographer
- Eduardo Serra (born 1958), Italian naval officer
- Eduardo Serra Rexach (born 1946), Spanish politician and businessman
- Enric Serra Auqué (1858–1918), Catalan painter
- Éric Serra (born 1959), French composer
- Ernesto Serra (1860–1915), Italian painter
- Eudalt Serra, Spanish composer

== F ==
- Federico Serra (born 1997), Italian football player
- Federico Serra Miras (born 1979), Argentine rugby union player
- Fiorenzo Serra (1921–2005), Italian film director
- Florent Serra (born 1981), French tennis player

== G ==
- Gabriela Serra (born 1951), Spanish teacher and politician
- Gennaro Serra, Duke of Cassano (1772–1779), Italian revolutionary and soldier
- Giacomo Serra (cardinal) (1570–1623), Catholic cardinal
- Gianni Serra (1933–2020), Italian film director and screenwriter

== H ==
- Hidalgo Serra (born 1985), Spanish-Italian musical artist

== I ==
- Isabel Serra (born 1989), Spanish activist and politician

== J ==
- Jaume Serra (disambiguation), several people
- Jaime Serra (1921–2022), Portuguese politician
- Jaime Serra Palou (born 1964), Catalan artist and journalist
- Jaime Serra Puche (born 1951), Mexican economist
- Janni Serra (born 1998), German footballer
- Jaume Serra i Cau (died 1517), Spanish Valencian cardinal
- Jaume Serra Serra (born 1959), Andorran politician
- Jaume Collet-Serra (born 1974), Spanish-American film director
- Jean Serra (born 1940), French mathematician and engineer
- Joan Serra (1927–2015), Spanish water polo player
- Joaquín Collar Serra (1906–1933), Spanish military aviator
- José Correia da Serra (1750–1823), Portuguese polymath
- José Serra Gil (1923–2002), Spanish cyclist
- José Serra (born 1942), Brazilian politician
- Joseph Serra (1940–2024), American politician
- Juan de Serras, Jamaican Maroon chief
- St. Junípero Serra (1713–1784), Spanish missionary

== K ==
- Katia Serra (born 1973), Italian footballer
- Koldo Serra (born 1975), Spanish film director and screenwriter

== L ==
- Loïc Serra (born 1972), French Formula One engineer
- Lorenzo Serra Ferrer (born 1953), Spanish football manager
- Luciana Serra (born 1946), Italian soprano
- Luigi Serra (1846–1888), Italian painter
- Luis Serra (1935–1992), Uruguayan cyclist
- Louis-Ferdinand de Rocca Serra (1936–2021), French politician

== M ==
- Manuel Serra Moret (1884–1963), Catalan politician and writer
- Manuel Francisco Serra (1935–1994), Portuguese footballer who played as a defender for Benfica
- María Martha Serra Lima (1944–2017), Argentine singer
- Mario José Serra (1926–2005), Argentine bishop
- Màrius Serra (born 1963), Spanish writer
- Marivi Fernández-Serra, Spanish condensed matter physicist
- Matt Serra (born 1974), American martial artist
- Maurizio Serra (born 1955), Italian writer and diplomat
- Michele Serra (born 1954), Italian writer, journalist and satirist
- Miguel de los Santos Serra y Sucarrats (1868–1936), Spanish prelate of the Roman Catholic church and Bishop of Sergorbe

== N ==
- Narcís Serra (born 1943), Spanish politician
- Narciso Serra (1830–1877), Spanish poet and dramatist
- Noelia Serra (born 1977), Dominican-Spanish tennis player

== O ==
- Osvaldo de Jesus Serra Van-Dúnem (1950–2006), Angolan politician
- Otto Mayer-Serra (1904–1968), Spanish-Mexican musicologist

== P ==
- Pedro Serra (1899–1983), Spanish footballer
- Pedro Antón Serra (1585–1632), Spanish prelate
- Pedro António Joaquim Correia da Serra Garção (1724–1772), Portuguese poet
- Pere Serra (fl. 1357–1406), Catalan painter

== R ==
- Rafael Serra (1858–1909), Afro-Cuban intellectual, journalist and activist
- Raimundo Irineu Serra, (1892–1971), founder of Santo Daime, an Amazonian mystery school
- Ramón Daumal Serra (1912–2008), Spanish Bishop of the Roman Catholic Church
- Raymond Serra (1936–2003), American actor
- Richard Serra (1938–2024), American sculptor
- Robert Serra (1987–2014), Venezuelan politician
- Roberta Serra (born 1970), Italian alpine skier
- Roberto Serra (born 1982), Italian short track speed skater
- Roser Serra (born 1971), Spanish international football goalkeeper

== S ==
- Sila Calderon Serra (born 1942), first female governor of Puerto Rico

== T ==
- Tomás Pérez Serra (born 1998), Argentine football player
- Tomas Serra Olives (born 1944), Spanish chess master
- Tony Serra (born 1934), American activist

== X ==
- Xavier Serra (born 1959), Spanish researcher

== Fictional characters ==
- Inara Serra, character from the science-fiction television series Firefly

== See also ==
- Serra (disambiguation)
- Sierra (disambiguation)
- Sardinian surnames
