= 1755 in literature =

This article contains information about the literary events and publications of 1755.

LEXICOGRAPHER. A writer of dictionaries; a harmless drudge that busies himself in tracing the original, and detailing the signification of words.

—Self-deprecating definition by Samuel Johnson from A Dictionary of the English Language

== Events ==
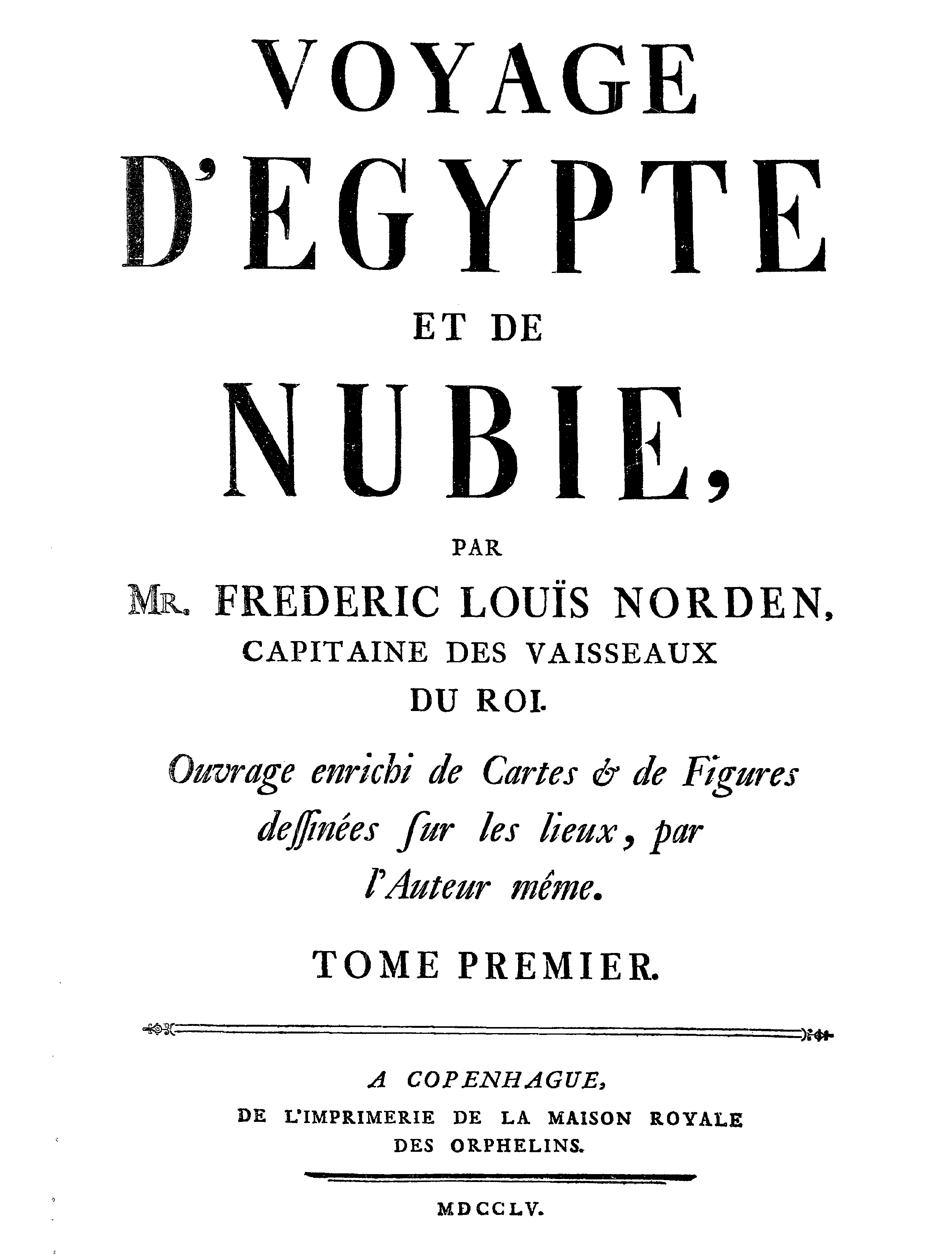
Frontpage of Voyage d'Egypte et de Nubie, 1755 edition.

- April 15 – Samuel Johnson's A Dictionary of the English Language is published by the group of London booksellers who commissioned it in June 1746, two months after Johnson was awarded the degree of Master of Arts (A.M.) by the University of Oxford, his alma mater.
- unknown dates
  - John Milton's Paradise Lost is translated into French prose by Louis Racine.
  - The first New Testament in the Ume Sami language is published.

== New Books ==
=== Fiction ===
- Charlotte Charke – The History of Mr. Henry Dumont and Miss Charlotte Evelyn
- Eliza Haywood as "Exploralibus" – The Invisible Spy
- Samuel Richardson – A Collection of ... Sentiments
- John Shebbeare – Letters on the English Nation
- Tobias Smollett – The History and Adventures of the Renowned Don Quixote

=== Poetry ===
- John Byrom – Epistle in Defence of Rhyme
- George Colman, the Elder and Bonnell Thornton (ed.) – Poems by Eminent Ladies
- John Gilbert Cooper – The Tomb of Shakespear
- David Dalrymple (editor) – Edom of Gordon: an ancient Scottish poem
- Stephen Duck – Caesar's Camp

=== Non-fiction ===
- Thomas Amory – Memoirs of Several Ladies of Great Britain
- Theophilus Cibber – An Epistle to David Garrick
- Madame de Maintenon – Mémoires
- Philip Doddridge – Hymns Founded on Various Texts
- Henry Fielding – The Journal of a Voyage to Lisbon
- Aryeh Leib ben Asher Gunzberg – Shaagas Aryeh (Hebrew: שאגת אריה, "Roar of the Lion")
- James Hervey – Theron and Aspasio; or a series of letters upon the most important and interesting subjects
- Benjamin Hoadly – Twenty Sermons
- Francis Hutcheson – A System of Moral Philosophy, in Three Books
- Samuel Johnson – A Dictionary of the English Language
- Étienne-Gabriel Morelly – Code de la nature, ou de véritable esprit de ses lois
- Frederic Louis Norden – Voyage d'Egypte et de Nubie
- Jean-Jacques Rousseau – Discourse on the Origin and Basis of Inequality Among Men
- Charles Wesley – An Epistle to John Wesley
- Edward Young – The Centaur not Fabulous; in five letters to a friend

== Drama ==
- John Brown – Barbarossa
- John Cleland – Titus Vespasian
- Thomas Francklin – The Orphan of China
- David Garrick – The Fairies (opera)
- Gotthold Ephraim Lessing – Miss Sara Sampson
- David Mallet – Britannia
- Vicente Garcia de la Huerta – Endimión

== Births ==
- February 17 – Dorothy Kilner, English children's writer (died 1836)
- February 21 – Anne Grant, Scottish poet (died 1838)
- March 5 – Jozef Ignác Bajza, pioneer Slovak novelist, satirist and priest (died 1836)
- March 15 – George Dyer, English poet and classicist (died 1841)
- December 31 – Thomas Grenville, English politician and book collector (died 1846)
- Unknown date – Maria Elizabetha Jacson, English writer on botany and gardening (died 1829)
- 1755/6 – Eliza Fay, English letter-writer and traveler (died 1816)

== Deaths ==
- February 10 – Charles de Secondat, Baron de Montesquieu, French satirist (born 1689)
- March – Jane Collier, English novelist (born 1715)
- April 6 – Richard Rawlinson, English antiquary and cleric (born 1690)
- September 9 – Johann Lorenz von Mosheim, German Lutheran church historian (born 1693)
- December 29 – Gabrielle-Suzanne Barbot de Villeneuve, French children's writer (born c. 1695)
- Unknown date – Antoni Serra Serra, Spanish religious writer (born 1708)
