= Francis Hutcheson (songwriter) =

Irish violinist, composer and physician

Francis Hutcheson (13 August 1721 – 5 September 1784) was an Irish violinist, composer, physician and lecturer in chemistry. His surname was often misspelled as "Hutchinson". He published his music under the pseudonym "Francis Ireland".

== Early life ==
Francis Hutcheson was born in Dublin. His parents were the philosopher Francis Hutcheson and his wife Mary (née Wilson).

His father was appointed to the Chair of Moral Philosophy in the University of Glasgow in 1729, necessitating a family move. Hutcheson studied in Glasgow University, graduating M.A. there in 1744, and M.D. in 1750.

His father died in 1746, leaving the younger Hutcheson property in Ballyhackamore and Drumalig, Saintfield, County Down, as well as County Longford. Hutcheson senior also left his son the task of organising his papers for publication. With the help of his father's colleague Rev. William Leechman, this task was completed in 1755 with the publishing of A System of Moral Philosophy, in Three Books, dedicated to Edward Synge.

== Medical and scientific life in Dublin ==
Francis Hutcheson was admitted to the Royal College of Physicians in Dublin in January 1754 and was appointed to the Meath Hospital. He was also appointed to lecture in chemistry in Trinity College, Dublin on 12 July 1760. He received the degree of Doctor in Physics from Trinity on 22 November 1761. Not only did he lecture the undergraduates, but in a form of early public engagement ran courses for the general public. Hutcheson resigned his post at Trinity College on 3 November 1767, the day after being elected a Fellow of the Royal College of Physicians.

Hutcheson (styled as Fra. Hutchison) was one of 49 physicians and chirurgeons who declared their public support for the construction of a Publick Bath in Dublin in May 1771 and named Achmet Borumborad as a well qualified individual for carrying such a scheme into existence.

He was then appointed consulting physician to the Rotunda Hospital in 1774, a post that he retained until 1784. He was also a member of the Board of Governors during this time. He was president of the Royal College of Physicians of Ireland in 1777 and 1780.

== Musical career ==
Francis Hutcheson was a keen violinist, and is probably the "Dr Hutchinson" who was a founder member of the Musical Academy, founded by Lord Mornington in Dublin in 1757 in whose orchestra he played violin. There is also a "Dr Hutchinson" (one of four "Gentlemen of Approved Taste") listed as a member of an organising committee for fundraising concerts in aid of the Rotunda Hospital.

Under the pseudonym "Francis Ireland", he composed glees, catches, and madrigals. These are mostly written for three voices (three sopranos or two sopranos and a bass). It is alleged he adopted this pseudonym for fear of public knowledge of his composing adversely affecting his professional prospects.

The Noblemen's and Gentlemen's Catch Club awarded prizes to three of his works: As Colin One Evening (1771), Jolly Bacchus (1772), and Where Weeping Yews (1773). Thomas Warren's series "A Collection of Catches, Canons and Glees" (London, c.1763–94) includes eleven glees and eight catches of his composition. Hutcheson's work also appeared in other collections including Henry Mountain's The Gentleman's Catch Book (Dublin, c.1790).

The Grove Dictionary (1900) describes Hutcheson as producing "many vocal compositions of considerable merit" and says that his "beautiful madrigal, 'Return, return, my lovely maid,' is universally admired".

== Personal life and death ==
Hutcheson lived in 32 Stafford Street, Dublin. He married Miss Sarah Card. They had three daughters and one son, also called Francis. This son was later Rev. Dr Francis Hutcheson, the Rector of Donaghadee.

Francis Hutcheson died in Dublin aged 63.

== Selected compositions ==
In alphabetical order, as the dating of most works is difficult.

- Ah ch'il destino mio bel tesoro, catch
- All in the Downs, glee
- As Colin One Evening, catch
- As Joan Lamenting Her Good Man, catch
- Awake My Fair, Awake, canzonetta
- Bacchus, to Arms, glee
- Black-Ey'd Susan (All in the Downs)
- Celia You Say Is Wondrous Fair, catch
- Come Thou Rosy Dimpl'd Boy, glee
- Could Gold Prolong My Fleeting Breath, glee
- Dear Hans to End, catch
- Dear Jenny I Love You, catch
- Fie, Nay Prithee John, catch
- From Flow'ry Meadows a Roving, catch
- Great God of Sleep, glee
- Have You Not in a Chimney Seen, catch
- Here's a Health to Old Brown, catch
- How Sleep the Brave (elegy), glee
- If Ever Roger Puffs or Boasts, catch
- If the Glasses Boy Are Empty, glee
- In Vain You Tell Your Parting Lover, glee
- I Pass I've Done So Well, catch
- I Say She's a Whore, catch
- I Want to Dress Pray Call, catch
- Jolly Bacchus Hear My Prayer, glee
- Let Me Alone Oh Fie upon't, catch
- Let's Drink, Boys, catch
- Love Ent'ring Chloe's Bosom, catch
- Lovely Lasting Peace of Mind, glee
- O Doctor I'm Terrified, catch
- O Lead Me to Some Peaceful Gloom, glee
- Odzooks, What a Pother, catch
- Oh Doctor, Oh Doctor, catch
- Return My Lovely Maid, glee
- Se viver non possio, catch
- There's Ned There's Tom and Harry, catch
- To Love and Wine, glee
- Tom Cobler, catch
- 'Twas on a Bright Morning, catch
- Twixt Dick and Tom, catch
- Where Weeping Yews (elegy), glee
- Why Then That Blush Allay, catch
- Zounds Hodge What Ye Devil Is Here, catch
