= A la Verge Santíssima: Dues Lletretes a Una Veu =

A la Verge Santíssima: Dues Lletretes a Una Veu (To the Most Holy Virgin: Two Letters in One Voice) is a collection of two hymns to the Virgin Mary: "Sia vostra gran puresa" (1904, Whether your high purity) and "Oració a Maria" (1908, Prayer to Mary), composed by Eudalt Serra; the text of the second hymn was written by Jacint Verdaguer in 1908. The music publisher was Foment de Pietat Catalana.
