= A System of Moral Philosophy, in Three Books =

1755 book by Francis Hutcheson

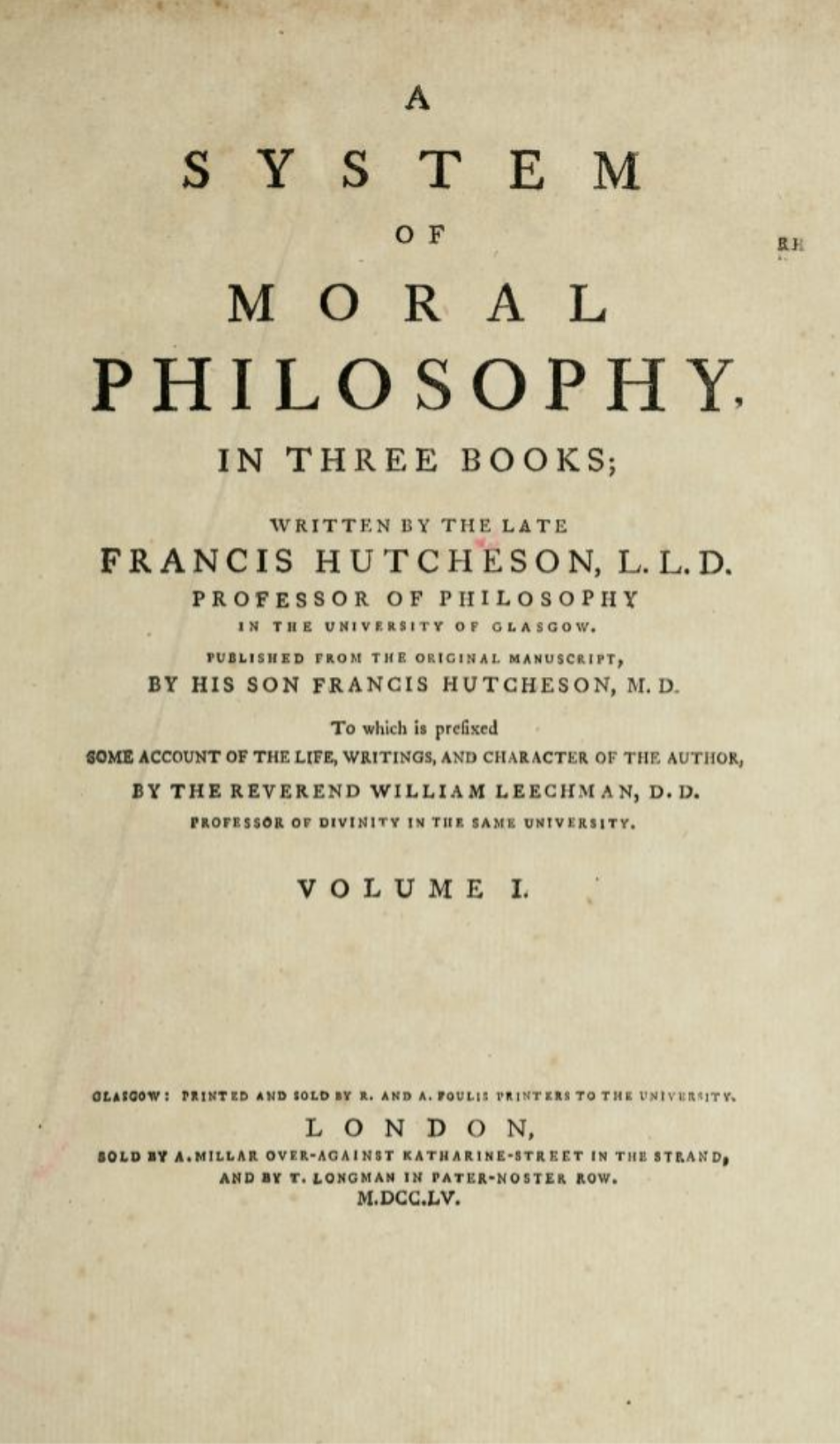
- Title page of Volume 1 of the first edition (1755)
- Author: Francis Hutcheson
- Language: English
- Subject: Moral philosophy
- Genre: Treatise
- Publisher: R. and A. Foulis
- Publication date: 1755
- Publication place: Kingdom of Great Britain
- Media type: Print (hardcover)
- Pages: 358 (volume 1); 380 (volume 2)
- OCLC: 8647481

A System of Moral Philosophy, in Three Books is a 1755 treatise by the Scottish Enlightenment philosopher Francis Hutcheson. Published after his death by his son, Francis Hutcheson the younger, it sets out Hutcheson's views on ethics, natural law, rights, and civil government. The work was issued in two volumes and includes a prefatory biographical account by William Leechman.

== Background ==
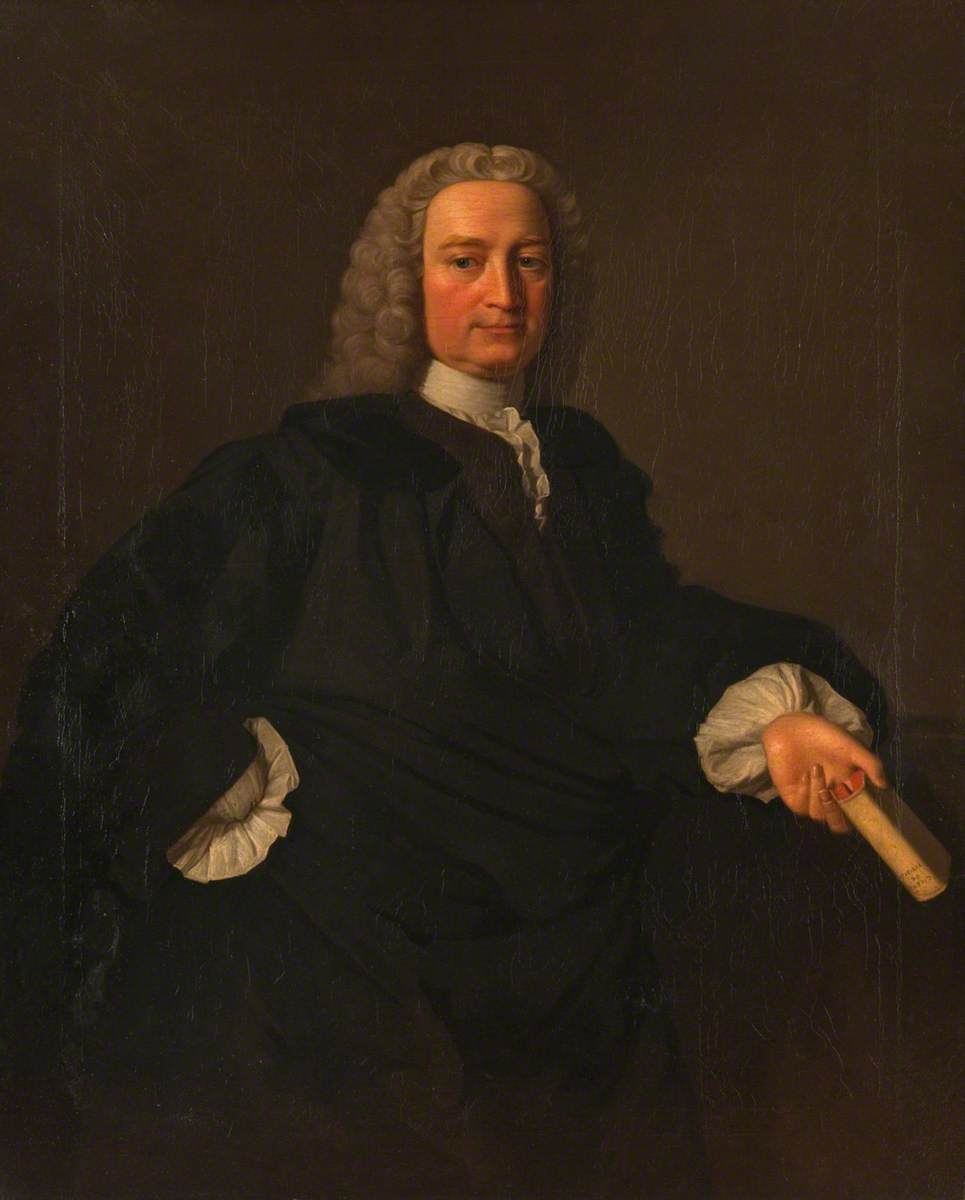
Hutcheson, c. 1745

Francis Hutcheson (1694–1746) was a philosopher of the Scottish Enlightenment and professor of moral philosophy at the University of Glasgow. He was a leading defender of moral sense theory, according to which moral judgement arises from an innate sense rather than from reason alone. He began work on A System of Moral Philosophy in 1738 and continued revising it until his death.

== Contents ==
In A System of Moral Philosophy, Hutcheson sets out a broad account of ethics, natural law, private rights, and political society.

=== Book I ===
The first book concerns human nature and the supreme good. Hutcheson discusses the faculties of the mind, the affections, and the will, and restates his view that human beings possess a moral sense by which they approve virtue and disapprove vice. He argues that virtue is grounded in benevolence directed by reason, and relates moral life to providence and natural religion.

=== Book II ===
The second book deals with natural law and private rights. Hutcheson discusses obligation, contracts, property, promises, oaths, and legal duties. He distinguishes between perfect and imperfect rights, and treats justice as distinct from broader duties of benevolence. He also argues that laws should answer to reason, public good, and natural equity.

=== Book III ===
The third book turns to civil society and government. Hutcheson examines the basis of political authority, the forms of government, and topics including marriage, family, slavery, taxation, magistracy, war, and civil law. He holds that political power must be exercised for the common good and with the consent of the governed.

== Hutcheson on animals ==
'Tis true these creatures are capable of some happiness and misery; their sufferings naturally move our compassion. We approve relieving them in many cases, and must condemn all unnecessary cruelty toward them as showing an inhuman temper.

— Francis Hutcheson

Modern commentators have drawn attention to Hutcheson's discussion of animals in the System. In a 2007 article, Aaron Garrett argued that Hutcheson offered an early argument for animal rights by grounding moral consideration in sentience and the capacity to suffer rather than in rational agency alone. Garrett also compared Hutcheson's treatment of animals with his discussion of infants, and placed him in a line of thought distinct from Lockean rights theory.

Michael Bradie likewise noted that Hutcheson treated cruelty to animals as morally wrong because animals are capable of suffering. At the same time, Bradie argued that Hutcheson retained a hierarchical account in which human beings, because of their superior rational capacities, may use animals when necessary. Bradie described this position as an early attempt to balance human interests with concern for animal suffering.

== Publication history ==
The book was printed by R. and A. Foulis in Glasgow and distributed in London by A. Millar and T. Longman. It appeared in two volumes in 1755, five years after Hutcheson's death; it was published posthumously by his son Francis Hutcheson the younger, from the original manuscript.

A new edition was published in 2000 by Thoemmes, with an introduction by Daniel Carey, and was later republished by A & C Black in 2006. A further edition was issued by Cambridge University Press in 2015.
