= Voyage d'Egypte et de Nubie =

Book by Frederic Louis Norden

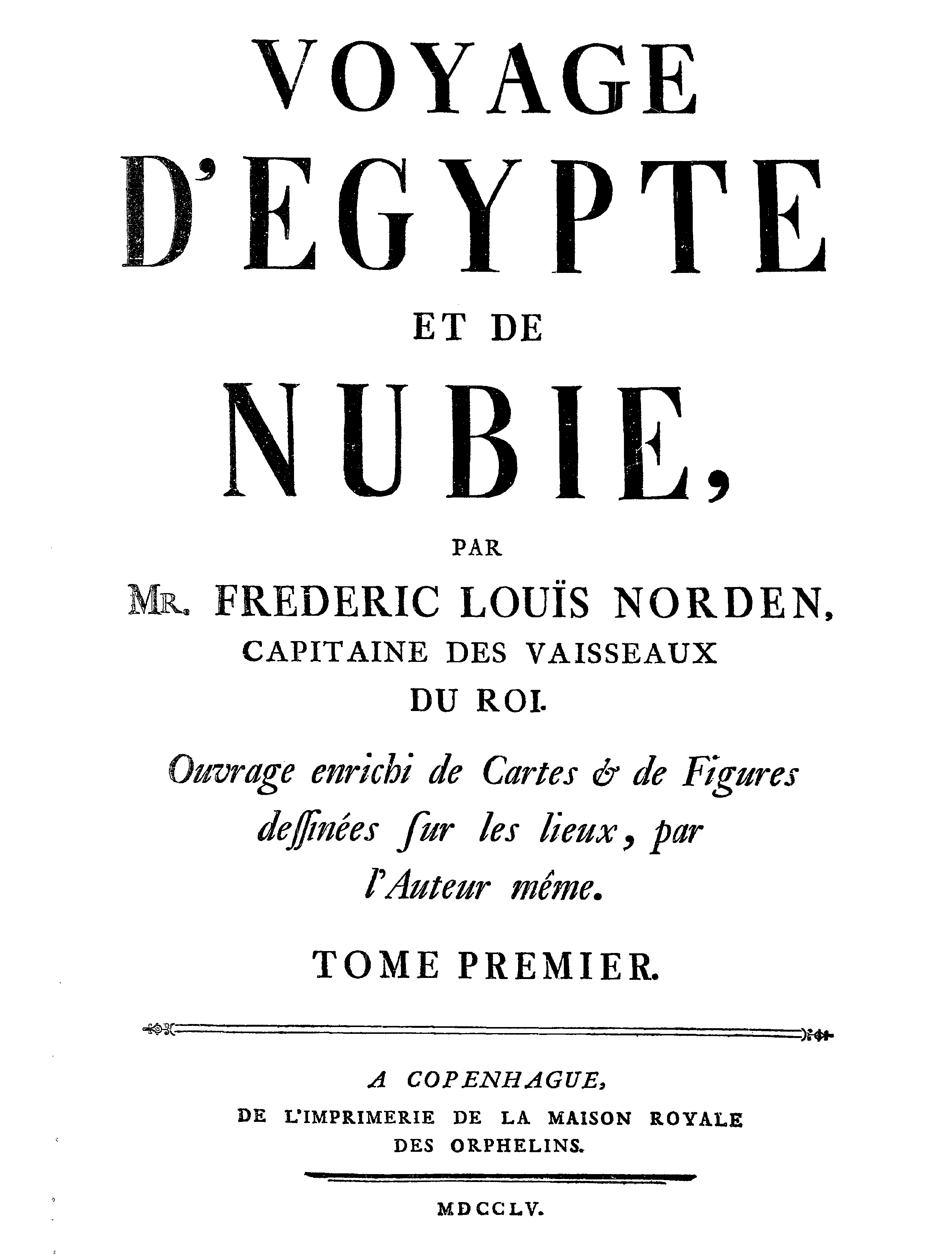
Frontpage of Voyage d'Egypte et de Nubie, 1755 edition.

Voyage d'Egypte et de Nubie (1755) records the extensive documentation and drawings by the Danish cartographer, and archaeological explorer Frederic Louis Norden of his pwn voyage through Egypt in 1737–38. The book contains some of the first realistic drawings of Egyptian monuments and to this day remains a primary source for the looks of Egyptian monuments before widespread 19th and 20th-century tourism and excavations.

== Composition and publication ==
The Royal Danish Academy of Sciences and Letters, under the order of Frederick V of Denmark, first published the book in 1755. Norden had already done some preliminary work, but got entangled in war-service for England. He died in France in 1742 of tuberculosis, before anything was ready. He left his documents and drawings to his friend.

== Copperplates and test drawings ==
Mark Tuscher from Nuremberg made the drawings into copperplates for the publication.

Norden published some test drawings from his voyage in 1741, under the long name Drawings of Some Ruins and Colossal Statues at Thebes in Egypt, with an account of the same in a letter to the Royal Society.

== Depiction of the Great Sphinx of Giza ==
A very often-used extract from this book is Norden's drawing of the Great Sphinx of Giza. As the first near-realistic drawing of the sphinx, he is the earliest known to draw the Sphinx with the nose missing. Although Richard Pococke in the same year visited and later published a stylish rendering (in A Description of the East and Some other Countries, 1743), he drew the Sphinx with the nose still on. Pococke's drawing is a faithful adoption of Cornelis de Bruijn's drawing of 1698 (Voyage to the Levant, 1702, English trans.), featuring only minor changes.

It is highly unlikely if the nose was still on that Norden out of free fantasy would leave it out. This drawing is often used to disprove the story that Napoleon I of France destroyed the nose of the Sphinx.

== Publications of the book (or parts of it) ==
- 1741 – Drawings of some ruins and colossal statues...., The Royal Society, London.
- 1755 – Voyage d'Egypte et de Nubie, tome premier, The Royal Danish Academy of Sciences and Letters, Copenhagen.
- 1757 – Travels in Egypt & Nubia, 2 Volumes in 1, Lockyer Davis & Charles Reymer, London. (translated by Peter Templeman)
- 1757 – A compendium of the travels of F.L. Norden through Egypt and Nubia, J. Smith, Dublin.
- 1775 - Beskrivelse over Ægypten og Nubien, Copenhagen, translated by Jørgen Stauning. The first Danish translation of parts of the work.
- 1779 – F.L. Norden, Beschreibung seiner Reise durch Egypten und Nubien, Johann Ernst Meyer, Leipzig and Breslau.
- 1780 – The antiquities, natural history, ruins and other curiosities of Egypt, Nubia and Thebes. Exemplified in near two hundred drawings taken on the spot, Lockyer Davis, London.
- 1790 – Frederik Ludvig Nordens Reiser igiennem Ægypten og Nubien in Samling af de bedste og nyeste Reisebeskrivelser i et udførligt Udtog, vol. 2, Gyldendal, Copenhagen.
- 1792 – The antiquities, natural history, ruins, and other curiosities of Egypt, Nubia, and Thebes. Exemplified in near two hundred drawings, taken on the spot, Edward Jeffery, London.
- 1795–98 – Voyage d'Egypte et de Nubie, Nouvelle édition, Pierre Didot l'ainé, Paris. (notes and additions by L. Langlès) v.1, v.2
- 1800 – Atlas du voyage d'Egypte et de Nubie, Bibliothèque portative des voyages, tome XI, Lepetit, Paris.
- 1814 – The travels of Frederick Lewis Norden through Egypt and Nubia, Sydney's Press, New Haven.

== See also ==
- Egypt in the European imagination
