= Gabriela Serra =

Spanish teacher and politician

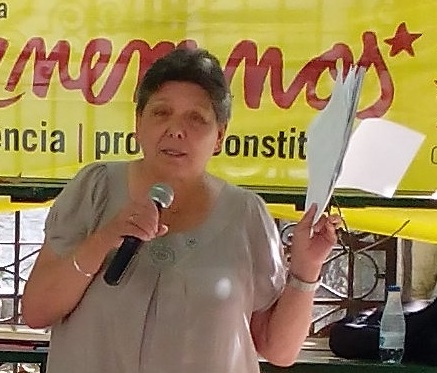

Member of the Parliament of Catalonia
- In office 26 October 2015 – 28 October 2017
- Constituency: Barcelona

Personal details
- Born: Maria Gabriela Serra i Frediani; 18 December 1951 (age 73); Mataró, Spain
- Political party: Communist Movement of Catalonia; Popular Unity Candidacy
- Occupation: Teacher, politician

Gabriela Serra i Frediani (born 18 December 1951) is a Spanish teacher and politician. An advocate of Catalan independence, she was a deputy in the Parliament of Catalonia for the Popular Unity Candidacy (CUP) from October 2015 to October 2017.

== Biography ==
Gabriela Serra was born into a middle-class family in Mataró. She and married in 1971, at age 19, and earned a licentiate in teaching and psychology. She traveled to Rome when her husband attended school there, and in late 1972 she came into contact with anti-capitalist movements.

In 1975 she moved to Santa Coloma de Gramenet, where she worked as a teacher at the Lluís Millet school in Singuerlín. There she became involved in local issues, and was president of the Singuerlín Neighborhood Association.

In 1979, Serra was head of the list of the Communist Movement of Catalonia (MCC) in the first democratic municipal elections in Santa Coloma. She was also active in Cercles Obrers Comunistes.

In 1984, she was number three on the list of the MCC's candidacy for the Parliament of Catalonia.

In 1986, she was involved in the anti-NATO campaign during Spain's membership referendum. She was part of Peace Brigades International in Guatemala from 1987 to 1989.

In 2001, Gabriela Serra, then president of the Catalan Federation of NGOs for Development, and Arcadi Oliveres, President of Justice and Peace of Spain, led a protest against Julia García-Valdecasas, delegate of the Government in Catalonia, over police charges against participants in a march against the World Bank in Barcelona. They denounced the escalation of police pressure on alternative movements.

She is currently a member of the non-governmental organization Entrepobles, FundiPau, the Delàs Center for Peace Studies, the Peace and Democracy Platform, and the Assemblea Nacional Catalana.

She was positioned as an anti-capitalist and feminist activist. She began to actively participate in the CUP at the urging of David Fernàndez during his time in the Parliament of Catalonia.

In the 2015 regional election, Serra was chosen as a candidate for the Popular Unity Candidacy–Constituent Call (CUP-CC) in primaries. She occupied the fourth position as an independent in the CUP-CC list for Barcelona, and won a seat as an autonomous deputy. Following the pact between Junts pel Sí and the CUP to elect Carles Puigdemont as president of the Generalitat de Catalunya, she was one of the deputies (along with Benet Salellas) appointed to work with the Junts pel Sí parliamentary group.

The Parliament of Catalonia was dissolved in the 2017–18 constitutional crisis. Serra was number 80 on the CUP list for the 2017 election, and did not win a seat. In October 2018 she joined the Advisory Council for the Promotion of a Civic and Social Forum for Constituent Debate.
