= Ernesto Serra =

Italian painter (1860–1915)

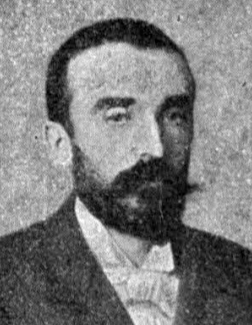
- Portrait of Ernesto Serra
- Born: Ernesto Serra; 24 March 1860; Varallo Sesia, Kingdom of Sardinia
- Died: 17 May 1915 (aged 55); Turin, Kingdom of Italy
- Education: Andrea Gastaldi
- Known for: Genre; portrait and landscape painting
- Notable work: Elda; Lo Scialle Rosso; Venditrice d'aranci; Gentiluomo A Cavallo; La Maddalena nel Deserto
- Awards: Gold medal Accademia Albertina, silver medal Esposizione d'Arte Sacra, Turin, 1898
- Patrons: Negozianti d'Arte di Colà

Ernesto Serra (24 March 1860 – 17 May 1915) was an Italian genre, landscape and portrait painter from Varallo Sesia, Province of Vercelli in the Piemonte Region.

== Biography ==
Serra was born on 24 March 1860 in Varallo Sesia, Italy. He studied at the Accademia Albertina in Turin under Professor Andrea Gastaldi (1826–1889) and won a gold medal for portrait painting. He specialized in genre, landscape and portrait painting.

At the Esposizione generale italiana del 1884, organised by the Società Promotrice dell'Industria Nazionale in Turin, he exhibited a portrait of a young lady called Lilia, also known as Elda, which was highly appreciated by the public and of which he subsequently produced about fifteen different versions. The painting was acquired by the committee of the Exposition to serve as prize for the exposition lottery. This was followed by exposition of Nadar at the 1885 Exposition Universelle d'Anvers in Antwerp. In 1886, he exhibited Così? at the Primaverile Fiorentina (Florentine Spring) exposition organised by the Società delle belle Arti di Firenze in Florence. Lilia was exposed again, together with the paintings Civetteria and Trastulli materni, at the 1887 Esposizione Nazionale Artistica di Venezia (National Artistic Exposition of Venice). From 1888 until 1895 he was sponsored by the Negozianti d'Arte di Colà and lived in Paris for two years where he exhibited Maura pienserosa and Visione at the Exposition Universelle (1889).

After his return to Italy, he had his studio at Corso Valentino 2 in Turin. In 1897 Serra exhibited paintings at the Biennale di Venezia (Venice Biennale) and in 1898 exposed three paintings (Compagni di giuochi, Venditrice d'aranci and Una mossa difficile) at the Esposizione Generale Italiana, and two religious paintings (Il Sonno del Bambino Gesù and Maddalena nel Deserto) at the Esposizione d'Arte Sacra Antica e Moderna (Exposition of Sacred Art) in Turin, for which he was awarded a silver medal. The committee responsible for the Valsesian show at the exposition published a magazine to represent the works of Valsesian artists at the exposition, which also featured works of Ernesto Serra. In 1901 he exposed Falciatore (the haymaker) at the International Art Exposition of Munich, which was very well received and re-exposed in 1904 at the Internazionale in Rome and in 1913 at the Esposizione della Promotrice di Belle Arti in Turin. In 1902 he participated in the Esposizione Quadriennale di Belle Arte in Turin with Fiori d'aprile. Many of Serra's paintings were acquired by state and municipal galleries, but he was also supporterd by king Victor Emmanuel III of Italy and by Princess Isabella of Bavaria, the Duchess of Genoa. Later in his life he focused on landscape painting of the mountains near Turin.

Ernesto Serra died in Turin on 17 May 1915 and sketches, drawings and paintings in his studio were auctioned off by Galleria Bollardi in Turin in 1917.

== List of paintings ==
- Gypsy Woman with a Tambourine, 1883. Oil on canvas, 79x125 cm.
- Farfalla nera (black butterfly, young man's portrait), no date. Exhibited at L'Esposizione di Belle Arti a Brera in 1885.
- Lilia or Elda, no date. Exhibited at the Esposizione Generale Italiana (1984-1985) dell '80 in Turin and at the National Artistic Exposition, Venice, 1887.
- Spanish Beauty, no date. Oil on canvas, 46x67 cm. Version of Lilia or Elda.
- A maiden in satin cloak, no date. Oil on canvas, 44x70 cm. Version of Lilia or Elda.
- Portrait De Jeune Orientale, no date. Oil on canvas, 43x69 cm. Version of Lilia or Elda. Private collection M.J. Waterloo, Amsterdam.
- Portrait Of A Young Beauty, no date. Oil on canvas, 39x64 cm. Version of Lilia or Elda.
- Ritratto Di Giovane Dama (A young beauty), no date. Oil on canvas, 44x72 cm. Version of Lilia or Elda.
- Ritratto Di Giovinetta, no date. Oil on canvas, 40x69 cm. Version of Lilia or Elda.
- Lo Scialle Rosso (Woman with red scarf), no date. Oil on canvas, 40x61 cm.
- Ritratto di fanciulla, no date. Oil on canvas, 38x77 cm.
- Nadar, exhibited at the 1885 Exposition Universelle d'Anvers in Antwerp, Belgium.
- Civetteria, no date. Exhibited at the National Artistic Exposition, Venice, 1887.
- Trastulli materni, no date. Exhibited at the National Artistic Exposition, Venice, 1887.
- Studio di donna, no date.
- Venetian marriage, no date.
- First communion, Venice, no date. Oil on canvas.
- Maura pienserosa (Pensive Maura), no date. Oil on canvas, 30x40 cm. Galleria Nazionale d'Arte Moderna, Rome, Italy.
- Visione, no date. Galleria Civica d'Arte Moderna, Turin, Italy.
- Alla Fontana, no date. Oil on canvas, 85x130 cm.
- Atmospheric sunsets, no date. Oil on canvas, pair of paintings, one signed, 60 x 100 cm.
- Compagni di giuochi, no date. Oil on canvas. Exposed at the 1898 Esposizione Generale Italiana in Turin.
- Una mossa difficile, no date. Oil on canvas. Exposed at the 1898 Esposizione Generale Italiana in Turin.
- Venditrice d'aranci (The orange seller), no date. Oil on canvas, 85x130 cm. Exposed at the 1898 Esposizione Generale Italiana in Turin.
- Venditrice d'aranci (The orange seller), no date, Oil on canvas, 58x90 cm.
- Il Sonno del Bambino Gesù, Oil on canvas. Exposed at the 1898 Esposizione d'Arte Sacra Antica e Moderna in Turin.
- La Maddalena nel Deserto, Oil on canvas. Exposed at the 1898 Esposizione d'Arte Sacra Antica e Moderna in Turin.
- Girl with basket of lambs, no date. Oil on canvas, 90x133 cm.
- Haymaking in the Forest, no date. Oil on canvas, 119x168 cm.
- Mucca al pascolo (cow in meadow), no date. Oil on panel, 12x18 cm.
- Gentiluomo A Cavallo (Gentleman Riding Horse), 1899. Oil on canvas, 143x300 cm.
- Dama Che Legge (Lady reading), no date. Oil on canvas, 112x167 cm.
- Dolci Pensieri, no date. Oil on canvas, 66x91 cm.
- Fanciulla Col Gatto, no date. Oil on canvas, 36x50 cm.
- Val di Cogne, no date. Oil on canvas, 140x100 cm.

== Art gallery ==
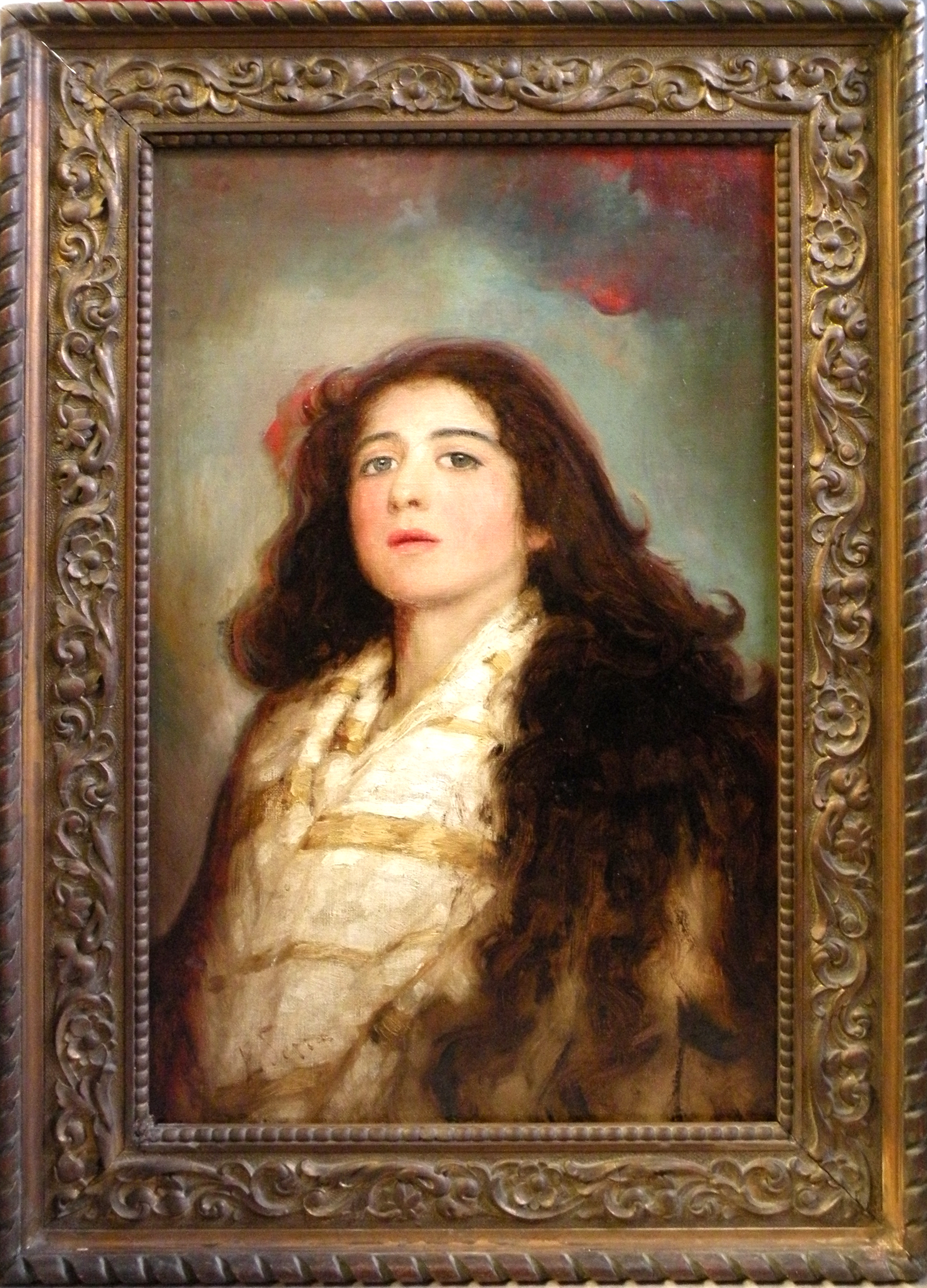
Version of Lilia or Elda, 1885–1890, oil on canvas

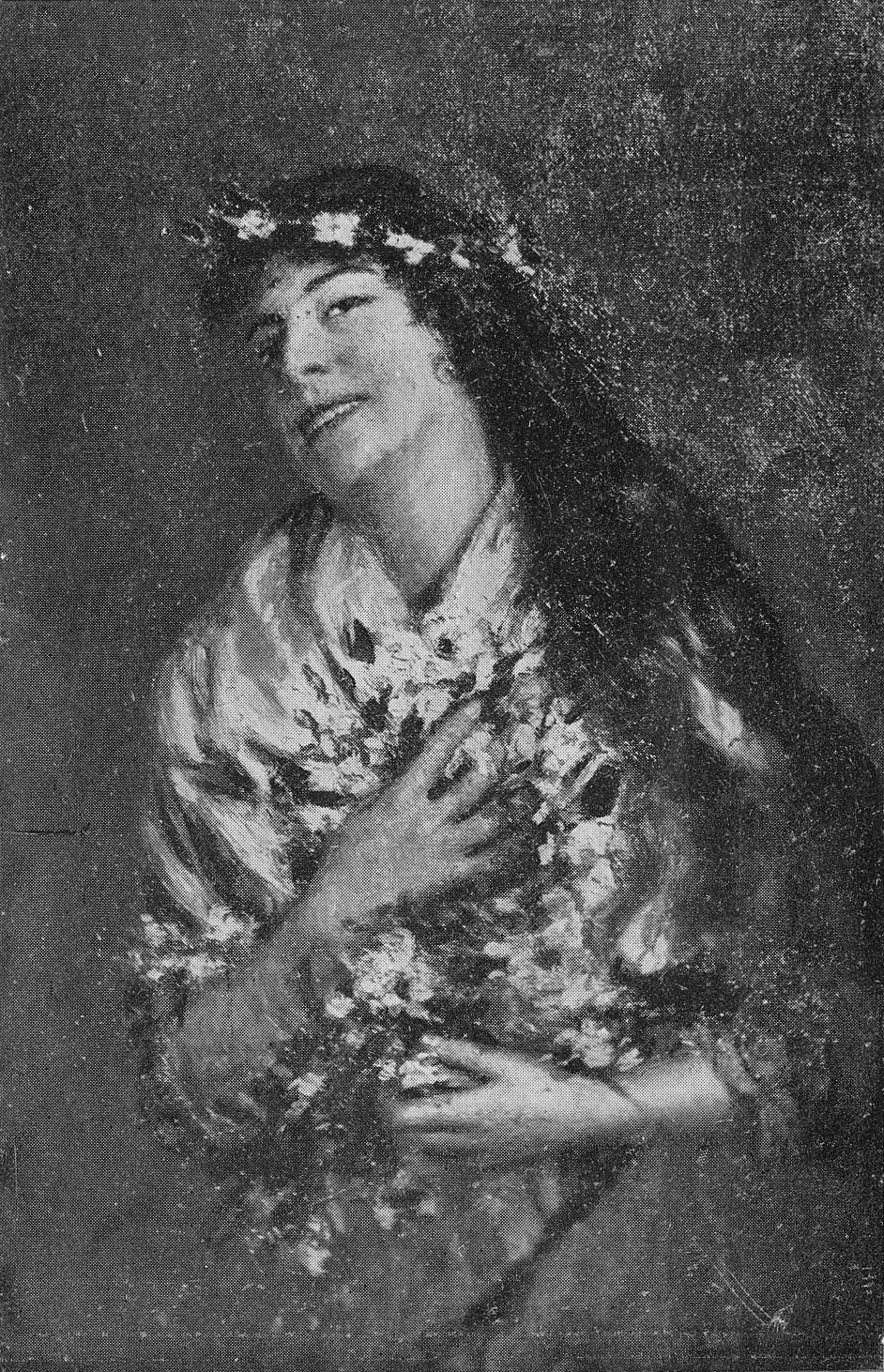
Primavera

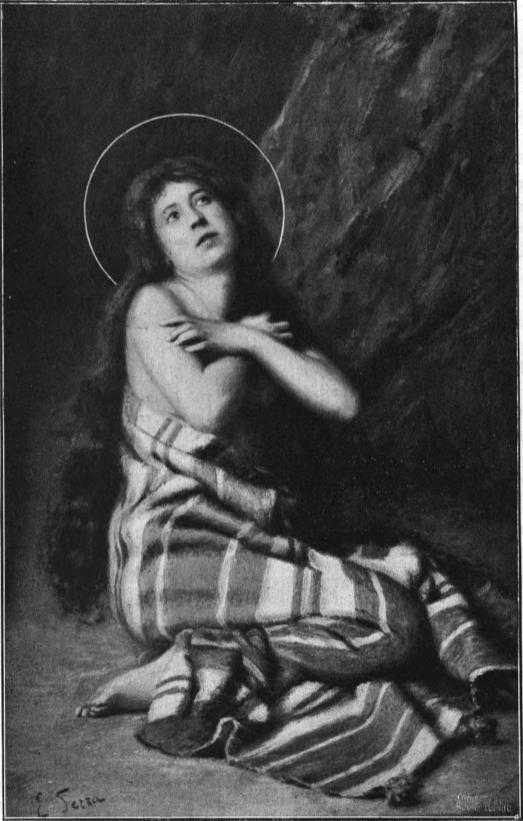
La Maddalena nel Deserto, oil on canvas. Exhibited at the Galleria d'Arte Moderna all'Esposizine d'Arte Sacra, Turin, 1898.

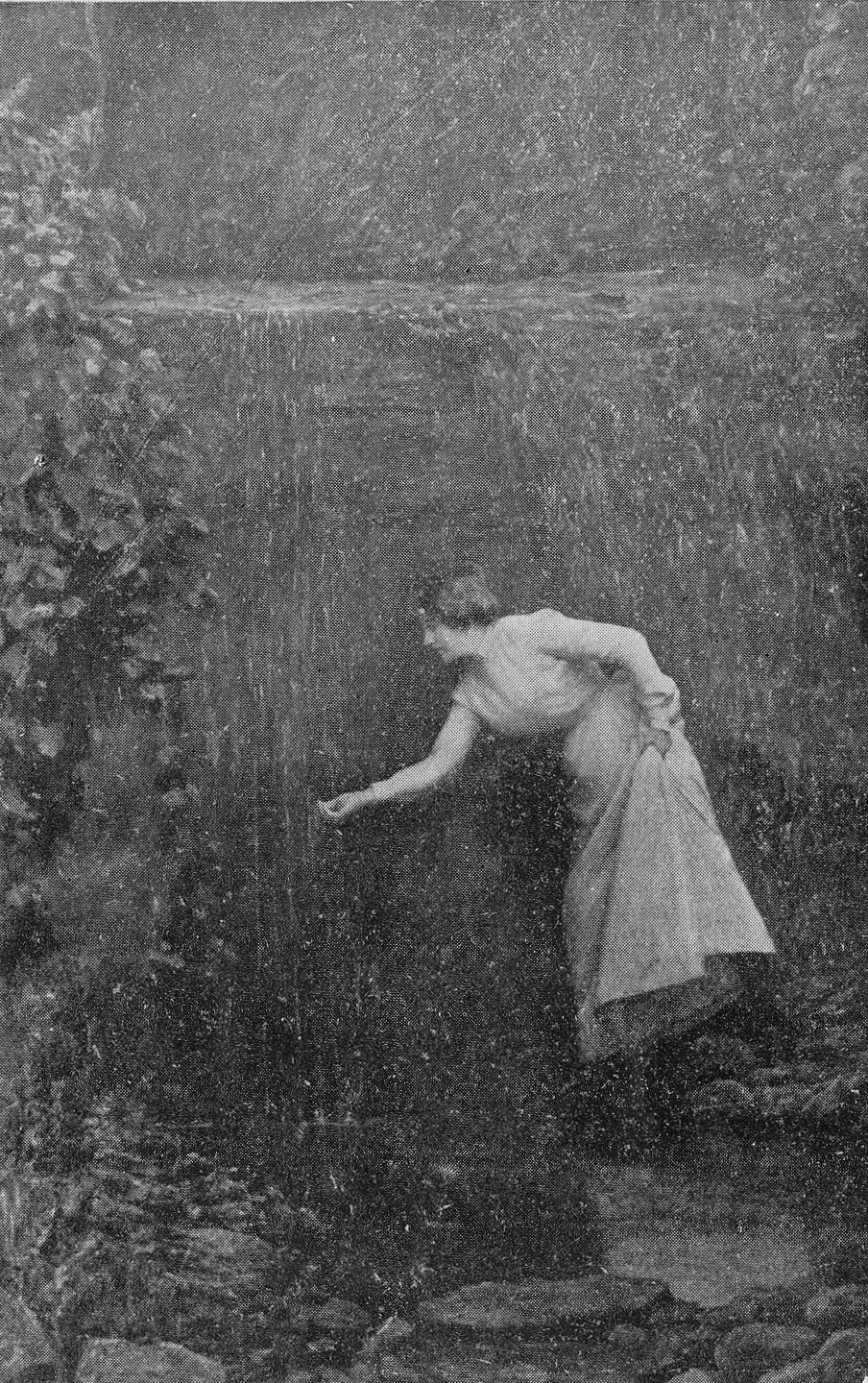
Alla Fontana

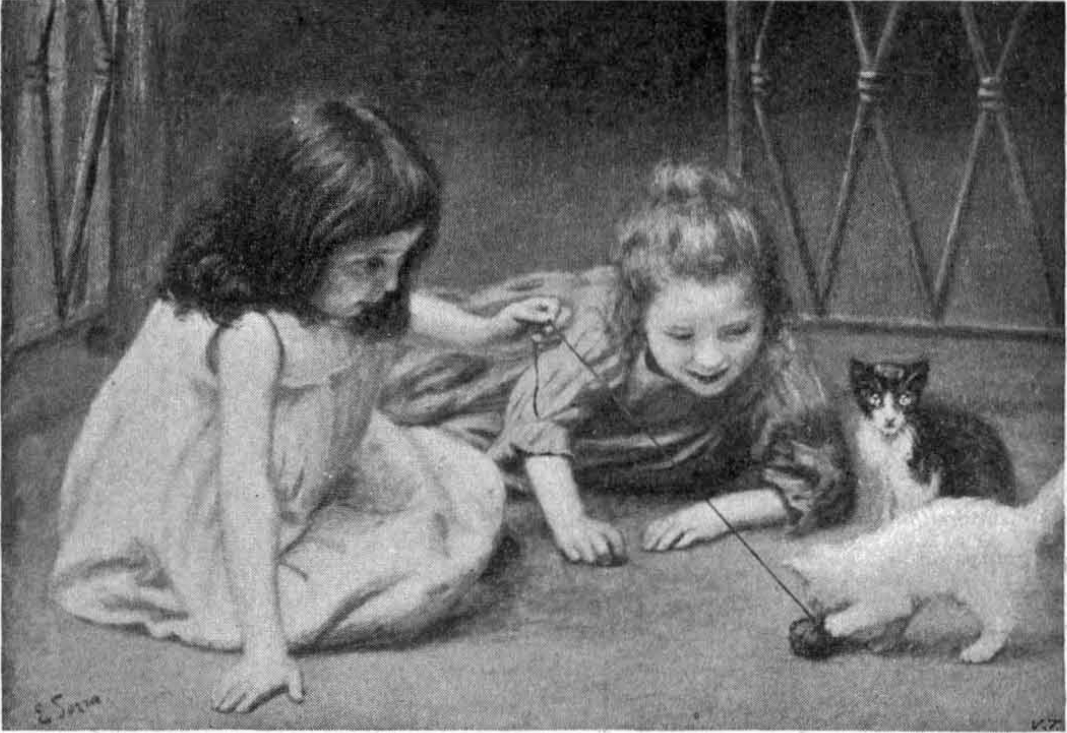
Compagni di giuochi. Exhibited at the Esposizione Generale Italiana, Turin, 1898.
