= Francis Hutcheson (philosopher) =

Irish philosopher (1694–1746)

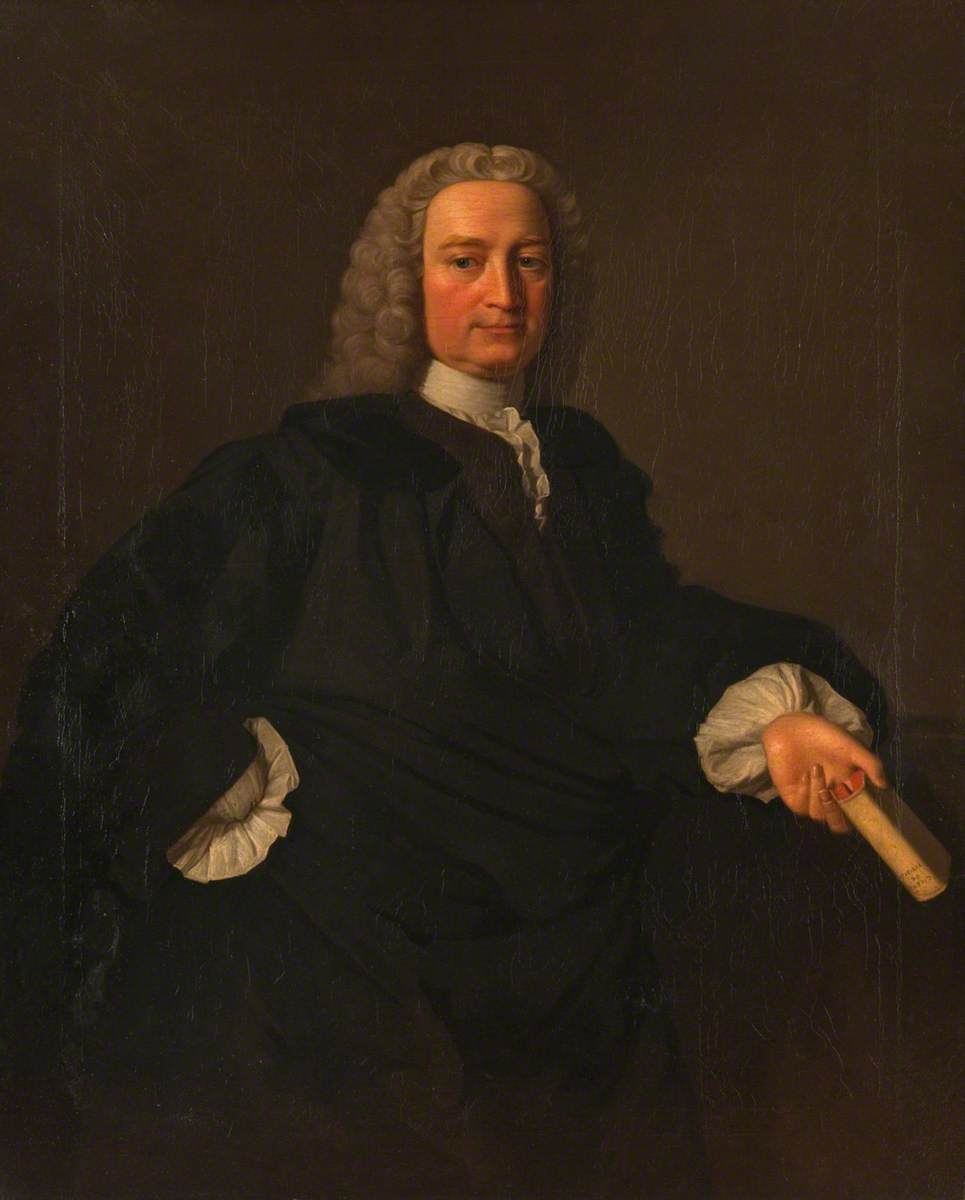
- Portrait by Allan Ramsay, c. 1745
- Born: 8 August 1694; Saintfield, County Down, Ulster, Kingdom of Ireland
- Died: 8 August 1746 (aged 52); Dublin, Kingdom of Ireland
- Children: Francis Hutcheson the younger

Education
- Education: University of Glasgow

Philosophical work
- Era: 18th-century philosophy
- Region: Western philosophy
- School: Empiricism; Scottish Enlightenment
- Institutions: University of Glasgow
- Notable works: A System of Moral Philosophy, in Three Books (1755)
- Notable ideas: Moral sense theory

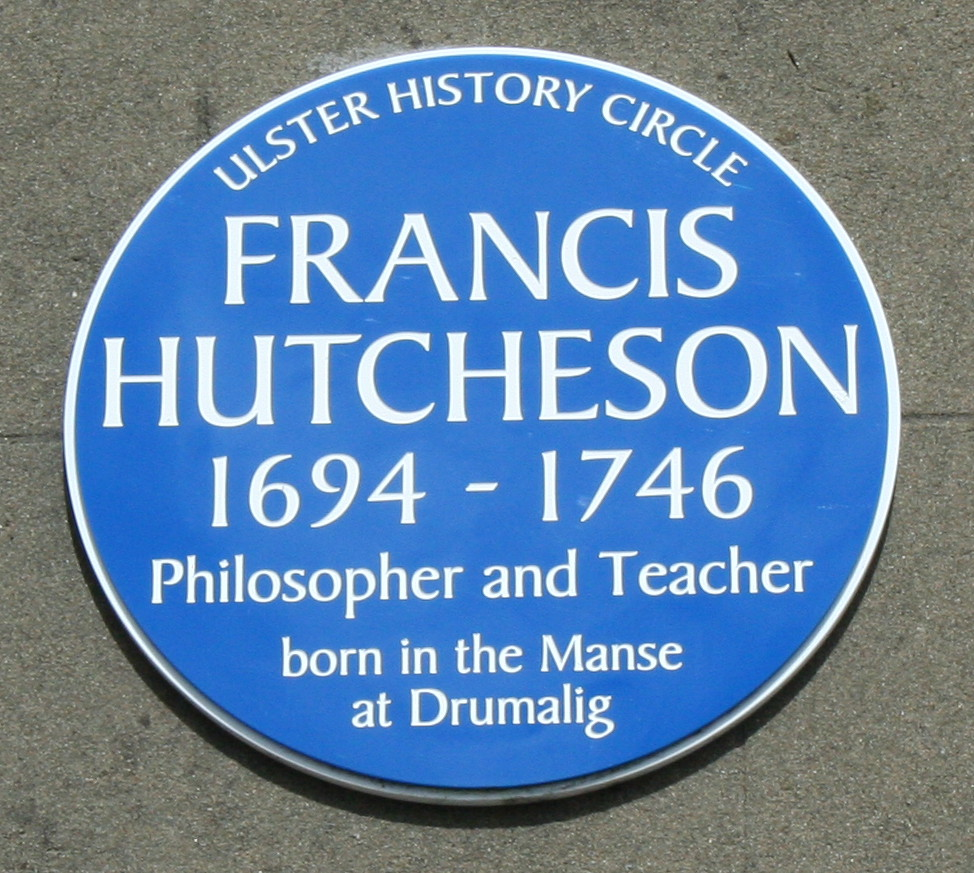
Plaque to Francis Hutcheson on the Guildhall, Saintfield

Francis Hutcheson (/ˈhʌtʃɪsən/; 8 August 1694 – 8 August 1746) was an Irish philosopher widely regarded as one of the key figures of the early Scottish Enlightenment. He served as Professor of Moral Philosophy at the University of Glasgow and was a major advocate of moral sense theory, which holds that humans possess an innate sense that guides moral judgments. Hutcheson is best known for his ethical writings, in which he defends benevolence as the primary source of moral virtue and anticipates later utilitarian theories with his formulation of "the greatest happiness for the greatest number".

Beyond ethics, Hutcheson made significant contributions to aesthetics, epistemology, logic, and metaphysics. He was among the first modern thinkers to explore beauty as a product of an internal sense, helping to establish aesthetics as a distinct branch of philosophy. In epistemology, he engaged critically with John Locke's empiricism while defending the role of innate dispositions. In logic and metaphysics, he proposed early versions of common-sense realism and contributed to the development of the Scottish school of common sense.

Hutcheson also developed an early argument for animal rights, contending that sentient creatures deserve moral consideration based on their capacity to experience pleasure and pain. His influence extended to later Enlightenment thinkers such as David Hume, Adam Smith, Jeremy Bentham, and Thomas Reid, and his writings were widely read in both Britain and colonial America.

== Biography ==
=== Early life ===
Hutcheson is thought to have been born at Drumalig in the parish of Saintfield, County Down, in modern-day Northern Ireland. He was the "son of a Presbyterian minister of Ulster-Scottish stock, who was born in Ireland" but whose roots were in Ayrshire in Scotland. Hutcheson was educated at Killyleagh, and went on to Scotland to study at the University of Glasgow, where he spent 1710 to 1718 in the study of philosophy, classics and general literature, and afterwards in the study of theology, receiving his degree in 1712. While a student, he worked as tutor to the Earl of Kilmarnock.

=== Return to Ireland ===
Facing suspicions about his "Irish" roots and his association with New Licht theologian John Simson (then under investigation by Scottish ecclesiastical courts), a ministry for him in Scotland was unlikely to be a success, so he returned to Ireland and received a licence to preach. When, however, he was about to enter upon the pastorate of a small dissenting congregation he changed his plans in order to pursue a career in academia. He established a private academy in Dublin, where, assisted by Thomas Drennan, he taught for 11 years until 1730.

In Dublin his literary attainments gained him the friendship of many prominent inhabitants. Among these was The Rt. Hon. and Most Rev. Dr William King, the Church of Ireland Lord Archbishop of Dublin, who refused to prosecute Hutcheson in the Archbishop's Court for keeping a school without the episcopal licence. Hutcheson's relations with the clergy of the established church, especially with Archbishop King and with The Rt. Hon. and Most Rev. Dr Hugh Boulter, Lord Archbishop of Armagh, seem to have been cordial, and his biographer, speaking of "the inclination of his friends to serve him, the schemes proposed to him for obtaining promotion", etc., probably refers to some offers of preferment, on condition of his accepting episcopal ordination.

In 1725 Hutcheson married his cousin Mary, daughter of Francis Wilson of Longford. Her dowry included extensive property holdings including the townlands of Drumnacross, Garrinch, and Knockeagh, in County Longford. They had seven children of whom only one survived, also called Francis.

While living in Dublin, Hutcheson published anonymously the four essays for which he is best known: in 1725 Inquiry concerning Beauty, Order, Harmony and Design, and Inquiry concerning Moral Good and Evil, which together comprise his Inquiry into the Original of our Ideas of Beauty and Virtue; and in 1728, the Essay on the Nature and Conduct of the Passions and Affections and Illustrations upon the Moral Sense. The alterations and additions made in the second edition of these essays were published in a separate form in 1726. To the period of his Dublin residence are also to be referred the Thoughts on Laughter (1725) (a criticism of Thomas Hobbes) and the Observations on the Fable of the Bees, being in all six letters contributed to Hibernicus' Letters, a periodical that appeared in Dublin (1725–1727, 2nd ed. 1734). At the end of the same period occurred the controversy in the London Journal with Gilbert Burnet (probably the second son of The Rt. Rev. Dr Gilbert Burnet, Lord Bishop of Salisbury) on the "True Foundation of Virtue or Moral Goodness". All these letters were collected in one volume (Glasgow, 1772).

=== Chair of Moral Philosophy at Glasgow ===
In 1729, Hutcheson succeeded his old master, Gershom Carmichael, in the Chair of Moral Philosophy at the University of Glasgow, being the first professor there to lecture in English instead of Latin. It is curious that up to this time all his essays and letters had been published anonymously, but their authorship appears to have been well known. In 1730, he entered on the duties of his office, delivering an inaugural lecture (afterwards published), De naturali hominum socialitate (About the natural fellowship of mankind). He appreciated having leisure for his favourite studies; "non-levi igitur laetitia commovebar cum almam matrem Academiam me, suum olim alumnum, in libertatem asseruisse audiveram." (I was, therefore, moved by no mean frivolous pleasure when I had heard that my alma mater had delivered me, its one time alumnus, into freedom.) Yet the works on which Hutcheson's reputation rests had already been published. During his time as a lecturer in Glasgow College he taught and influenced Adam Smith, the economist and philosopher. "[T]he order of topics discussed in the economic portion of Hutcheson's System [of Moral Philosophy, 1755] is repeated by Smith in his Glasgow Lectures and again in the Wealth of Nations."

However, it was likely something other than Hutcheson's written work that had such a great influence on Smith. Hutcheson was well regarded as one of the most prominent lecturers at the University of Glasgow in his day and earned the approbation of students, colleagues, and even ordinary residents of Glasgow with the fervour and earnestness of his orations. His roots as a minister indeed shone through in his lectures, which endeavoured not merely to teach philosophy but also to make his students embody that philosophy in their lives (appropriately acquiring the epithet, preacher of philosophy). Unlike Smith, Hutcheson was not a system builder; rather, it was his magnetic personality and method of lecturing that so influenced his students and caused the greatest of those to reverentially refer to him as "the never to be forgotten Hutcheson", a title that Smith in all his correspondence used to describe only two people, his good friend David Hume and influential mentor, Hutcheson.

=== Death ===
Francis Hutcheson spent time in Dublin, and died while on a visit to that city in 1746. He is buried in the churchyard of Saint Mary's, which is also the final resting place of his cousin, the architect Sir William Bruce. Today Saint Mary's is a public park located in what is now Wolfe Tone Street. Many United Irishmen would have revered the memory of Francis Hutcheson. Some of the leaders of the Dublin United Irishmen are remembered in the street and place-names of the city. Most Dubliners can direct a visitor to Wolfe Tone Street, Oliver Bond Street, Russell Street, Lord Edward Street and Emmet Road. "Never to be forgotten Hutcheson" lies in what is now an unmarked grave in the Dublin he loved and "where his best work was done".

== Ethics ==
According to Hutcheson, man has a variety of senses, internal as well as external, reflex as well as direct, the general definition of a sense being "any determination of our minds to receive ideas independently on our will, and to have perceptions of pleasure and pain" (Essay on the Nature and Conduct of the Passions, sect. 1). He does not attempt to give an exhaustive enumeration of these "senses", but, in various parts of his works, he specifies, besides the five external senses commonly recognized (which he hints might be added to):

1. consciousness, by which each man has a perception of himself and of all that is going on in his own mind (Metaph. Syn. pars i. cap. 2)
2. the sense of beauty (sometimes called specifically "an internal sense")
3. a public sense, or sensus communis, "a determination to be pleased with the happiness of others and to be uneasy at their misery"
4. the moral sense, or "moral sense of beauty in actions and affections, by which we perceive virtue or vice, in ourselves or others"
5. a sense of honour, or praise and blame, "which makes the approbation or gratitude of others the necessary occasion of pleasure, and their dislike, condemnation or resentment of injuries done by us the occasion of that uneasy sensation called shame"
6. a sense of the ridiculous. It is plain, as the author confesses, that there may be "other perceptions, distinct from all these classes," and, in fact, there seems to be no limit to the number of "senses" in which a psychological division of this kind might result.

Of these "senses," the "moral sense" plays the most important part in Hutcheson's ethical system. It pronounces immediately on the character of actions and affections, approving those that are virtuous, and disapproving those that are vicious. "His principal design," he says in the preface to the two first treatises, "is to show that human nature was not left quite indifferent in the affair of virtue, to form to itself observations concerning the advantage or disadvantage of actions, and accordingly to regulate its conduct. The weakness of our reason, and the avocations arising from the infirmity and necessities of our nature, are so great that very few men could ever have formed those long deductions of reasons that show some actions to be in the whole advantageous to the agent, and their contraries pernicious. The Author of nature has much better furnished us for a virtuous conduct than our moralists seem to imagine, by almost as quick and powerful instructions as we have for the preservation of our bodies. He has made virtue a lovely form, to excite our pursuit of it, and has given us strong affections to be the springs of each virtuous action."

Passing over the appeal to final causes involved in this passage, as well as the assumption that the "moral sense" has had no growth or history, but was "implanted" in man exactly as found among the more civilized races (an assumption common to both Hutcheson and Butler), his use of the term "sense" tends to obscure the real nature of the process of moral judgement. For, as established by Hume, this act consists of two parts: an act of deliberation leading to an intellectual judgement; and a reflex feeling of satisfaction at actions we consider good, and of dissatisfaction at those we consider bad. By the intellectual part of this process, we refer the action or habit to a certain class; but no sooner is the intellectual process complete than there is excited in us a feeling similar to what myriads of actions and habits of (apparently) the same class excited in us on former occasions.

Even if the latter part of this process is instantaneous, uniform and exempt from error, the former is not. All mankind may approve of that which is virtuous or makes for the general good, but they entertain the most widely divergent opinions and frequently arrive at directly opposite conclusions as to particular actions and habits. Hutcheson recognizes this obvious distinction in his analysis of the mental process preceding moral action, and does not ignore it, even when writing on the moral approbation or disapprobation that follows action. Nonetheless, Hutcheson, both by his phraseology and the language he uses to describe the process of moral approbation, has done much to favour that loose, popular view of morality which, ignoring the necessity of deliberation and reflection, encourages hasty resolves and unpremeditated judgements.

The term "moral sense" (which, it may be noticed, had already been employed by Shaftesbury, not only, as William Whewell suggests, in the margin, but also in the text of his Inquiry), if invariably coupled with the term "moral judgement," would be open to little objection; but, taken alone, as designating the complex process of moral approbation, it is liable to lead not only to serious misapprehension but to grave practical errors. For, if each person's decisions are solely the result of an immediate intuition of the moral sense, why be at any pains to test, correct or review them? Or why educate a faculty whose decisions are infallible? And how do we account for differences in the moral decisions of different societies, and the observable changes in a person's own views? The expression has, in fact, the fault of most metaphorical terms: it leads to an exaggeration of the truth it is intended to suggest.

But though Hutcheson usually describes the moral faculty as acting instinctively and immediately, he does not, like Butler, conflate the moral faculty with the moral standard. The test or criterion of right action is with Hutcheson, as with Shaftesbury, its tendency to promote the general welfare of mankind. He thus anticipates the utilitarianism of Bentham, not only in principle, but even in the use of the phrase "the greatest happiness for the greatest number" (Inquiry concerning Moral Good and Evil, section 3). Hutcheson does not seem to have seen an inconsistency between this external criterion with his fundamental ethical principle. Intuition has no possible connection with an empirical calculation of results, and Hutcheson in adopting such a criterion practically denies his fundamental assumption. Connected with Hutcheson's virtual adoption of the utilitarian standard is a kind of moral algebra, proposed for the purpose of "computing the morality of actions". (Note: This calculus occurs in the Inquiry concerning Moral Good and Evil, section 3.)

Hutcheson's other distinctive ethical doctrine is what has been called the "benevolent theory" of morals. Hobbes had maintained that all other actions, however disguised under apparent sympathy, have their roots in self-love. Hutcheson not only maintains that benevolence is the sole and direct source of many of our actions, but, by a not unnatural recoil from the repellent doctrine of Hobbes, that it is the only source of those actions of which, on reflection, we approve. Consistently with this position, actions that flow from self-love only are morally indifferent. But surely, by the common consent of civilized men, prudence, temperance, cleanliness, industry, self-respect and, in general, the "personal virtues", are regarded, and rightly regarded, as fitting objects of moral approbation.

This consideration could hardly escape any author, however wedded to his own system, and Hutcheson attempts to extricate himself from the difficulty by laying down the position that a man may justly regard himself as a part of the rational system, and may thus "be, in part, an object of his own benevolence" (Ibid.), a curious abuse of terms, which really concedes the question at issue. Moreover, he acknowledges that, though self-love does not merit approbation, neither, except in its extreme forms, did it merit condemnation, indeed the satisfaction of the dictates of self-love is one of the very conditions of the preservation of society. To press home the inconsistencies involved in these various statement would be a superfluous task.

The vexed question of liberty and necessity appears to be carefully avoided in Hutcheson's professedly ethical works. But, in the Synopsis metaphysicae, he touches on it in three places, briefly stating both sides of the question, but evidently inclining to what he designates as the opinion of the Stoics, in opposition to what he designates as the opinion of the Peripatetics. This is substantially the same as the doctrine propounded by Hobbes and Locke (to the latter of whom Hutcheson refers in a note), namely that our will is determined by motives in conjunction with our general character and habit of mind, and that the only true liberty is the liberty of acting as we will, not the liberty of willing as we will. Though, however, his leaning is clear, he carefully avoids dogmatising, and deprecates the angry controversies to which the speculation on this subject had given rise.

It is easy to trace the influence of Hutcheson's ethical theories on the systems of Hume and Adam Smith. The prominence given by these writers to the analysis of moral action and moral approbation with the attempt to discriminate the respective provinces of the reason and the emotions in these processes, is undoubtedly due to the influence of Hutcheson. To a study of the writings of Shaftesbury and Hutcheson we might, probably, in large measure, attribute the unequivocal adoption of the utilitarian standard by Hume, and, if this be the case, the name of Hutcheson connects itself, through Hume, with the names of Priestley, Paley and Bentham. Butler's Sermons appeared in 1726, the year after the publication of Hutcheson's two first essays, and there are parallels between the "conscience" of the one writer and the "moral sense" of the other.

== Mental philosophy ==
In the sphere of mental philosophy and logic, Hutcheson's contributions are by no means so important or original as in that of moral philosophy. They are interesting mainly as a link between Locke and the Scottish school. In the former subject the influence of Locke is apparent throughout. All the main outlines of Locke's philosophy seem, at first sight, to be accepted as a matter of course. Thus, in stating his theory of the moral sense, Hutcheson is peculiarly careful to repudiate the doctrine of innate ideas (see, for instance, Inquiry concerning Moral Good and Evil, sect. I ad fin., and sect. 4; and compare Synopsis Metaphysicae, pars i. cap. 2). At the same time he shows more discrimination than does Locke in distinguishing between the two uses of this expression, and between the legitimate and illegitimate form of the doctrine (Syn. Metaph. pars i. cap. 2).

All our ideas are, as by Locke, referred to external or internal sense, or, in other words, to sensation and reflection. It is, however, a most important modification of Locke's doctrine, and connects Hutcheson's mental philosophy with that of Reid, when he states that the ideas of extension, figure, motion and rest "are more properly ideas accompanying the sensations of sight and touch than the sensations of either of these senses"; that the idea of self accompanies every thought, and that the ideas of number, duration and existence accompany every other idea whatsoever (see Essay on the Nature and Conduct of the Passions, sect. i. art. I; Syn. Metaph. pars i. cap. 1, pars ii. cap. I; Hamilton on Reid, p. 124, note). Other important points in which Hutcheson follows the lead of Locke are his depreciation of the importance of the so-called laws of thought, his distinction between the primary and secondary qualities of bodies, the position that we cannot know the inmost essences of things ("intimae rerum naturae sive essentiae"), though they excite various ideas in us, and the assumption that external things are known only through the medium of ideas (Syn. Metaph. pars i. cap. I), though, at the same time, we are assured of the existence of an external world corresponding to these ideas.

Hutcheson attempts to account for our assurance of the reality of an external world by referring it to a natural instinct (Syn. Metaph. pars i. cap. 1). Of the correspondence or similitude between our ideas of the primary qualities of things and the things themselves God alone can be assigned as the cause. This similitude has been effected by Him through a law of nature. "Haec prima qualitatum primariarum perceptio, sive mentis actio quaedam sive passio dicatur, non-alia similitudinis aut convenientiae inter ejusmodi ideas et res ipsas causa assignari posse videtur, quam ipse Deus, qui certa naturae lege hoc efilcit, Ut notiones, quae rebus praesentibus excitantur, sint ipsis similes, aut saltem earum habitudines, si non-veras quantitates, depingant" (pars ii. cap. I). Locke does speak of God "annexing" certain ideas to certain motions of bodies; but nowhere does he propound a theory so definite as that here propounded by Hutcheson, which reminds us at least as much of the speculations of Nicolas Malebranche as of those of Locke.

Amongst the more important points in which Hutcheson diverges from Locke is his account of the idea of personal identity, which he appears to have regarded as made known to us directly by consciousness. The distinction between body and mind, corpus or materia and res cogitans, is more emphatically accentuated by Hutcheson than by Locke. Generally, he speaks as if we had a direct consciousness of mind as distinct from body, though, in the posthumous work on Moral Philosophy, he expressly states that we know mind as we know body" by qualities immediately perceived though the substance of both be unknown (bk. i. ch. 1). The distinction between perception proper and sensation proper, which occurs by implication though it is not explicitly worked out (see Hamilton's Lectures on Metaphysics, – Lect. 24).

Hamilton's edition of Dugald Stewart's Works, v. 420 (the imperfection of the ordinary division of the external senses into two classes, the limitation of consciousness to a special mental faculty) (severely criticized in Sir W Hamilton's Lectures on Metaphysics Lect. xii.) and the disposition to refer on disputed questions of philosophy not so much to formal arguments as to the testimony of consciousness and our natural instincts are also amongst the points in which Hutcheson supplemented or departed from the philosophy of Locke. The last point can hardly fail to suggest the "common-sense philosophy" of Reid.

Thus, in estimating Hutcheson's position, we find that in particular questions he stands nearer to Locke, but in the general spirit of his philosophy he seems to approach more closely to his Scottish successors.

The short Compendium of Logic, which is more original than such works usually are, is remarkable chiefly for the large proportion of psychological matter that it contains. In these parts of the book Hutcheson mainly follows Locke. The technicalities of the subject are passed lightly over, and the book is readable. It may be specially noticed that he distinguishes between the mental result and its verbal expression judgment-proposition, that he constantly employs the word "idea," and that he defines logical truth as "convenientia signorum cum rebus significatis" (or "propositionis convenientia cum rebus ipsis," Syn. Metaph. pars i. cap. 3), thus implicitly repudiating a merely formal view of logic.

== Aesthetics ==
Hutcheson may further be regarded as one of the earliest modern writers on aesthetics. His speculations on this subject are contained in the Inquiry concerning Beauty, Order, Harmony and Design, the first of the two treatises published in 1725. He maintains that we are endowed with a special sense by which we perceive beauty, harmony and proportion. This is a reflex sense, because it presupposes the action of the external senses of sight and hearing. It may be called an internal sense, both to distinguish its perceptions from the mere perceptions of sight and hearing, and because "in some other affairs, where our external senses are not much concerned, we discern a sort of beauty, very like in many respects to that observed in sensible objects, and accompanied with like pleasure" (Inquiry, etc., sect. 1, XI). The latter reason leads him to call attention to the beauty perceived in universal truths, in the operations of general causes and in moral principles and actions. Thus, the analogy between beauty and virtue, which was so favourite a topic with Shaftesbury, is prominent in the writings of Hutcheson also. Scattered up and down the treatise there are many important and interesting observations that our limits prevent us from noticing. But to the student of mental philosophy it may be specially interesting to remark that Hutcheson both applies the principle of association to explain our ideas of beauty and also sets limits to its application, insisting on there being "a natural power of perception or sense of beauty in objects, antecedent to all custom, education or example" (see Inquiry, etc., sects. 6, 7; Hamilton's Lectures on Metaphysics, Lect. 44 ad fin.).

Hutcheson's writings gave rise to much controversy. To say nothing of minor opponents, such as "Philaretus" (Gilbert Burnet, already alluded to), Dr John Balguy (1686–1748), prebendary of Salisbury, the author of two tracts on "The Foundation of Moral Goodness", and Dr John Taylor (1694–1761) of Norwich, a minister of considerable reputation in his time (author of An Examination of the Scheme of Amorality advanced by Dr Hutcheson), the essays appear to have suggested, by antagonism, at least two works that hold a permanent place in the literature of English ethics—Butler's Dissertation on the Nature of Virtue, and Richard Price's Treatise of Moral Good and Evil (1757). In this latter work the author maintains, in opposition to Hutcheson, that actions are – in themselves right or wrong, that right and wrong are simple ideas incapable of analysis, and that these ideas are perceived immediately by the understanding. We thus see that, not only directly but also through the replies that it called forth, the system of Hutcheson, or at least the system of Hutcheson combined with that of Shaftesbury, contributed, in large measure, to the formation and development of some of the most important of the later schools of ethics.

== Animal rights ==
Francis Hutcheson is recognized as a foundational yet underappreciated figure in the early history of animal rights philosophy. According to Aaron Garrett, Hutcheson challenges prevailing early modern views that deny animals moral standing on the grounds that they lack rationality. Philosophers such as Thomas Hobbes, John Locke, Samuel Pufendorf, and Baruch Spinoza typically exclude animals from the domain of rights or justify humane treatment solely in terms of human benefit or divine order. In contrast, Hutcheson argues that the capacity of animals to feel pleasure and pain provides a sufficient basis for moral consideration and duties toward them, regardless of their cognitive abilities.

Hutcheson's moral philosophy, rooted in moral sense theory and influenced by Richard Cumberland and Shaftesbury, emphasizes benevolence and the general good as foundations of rights. In his A System of Moral Philosophy, in Three Books (1755), Hutcheson maintains that animals have a right not to suffer unnecessary pain, and that this right is grounded in their sentience and the obligations of humans as moral agents within a divinely ordered system. He views domesticated animals, in particular, as forming part of a moral community with humans, due to their capacity for mutual benefit and their role in human society.

Hutcheson's approach anticipates later utilitarian arguments for animal rights by thinkers such as Humphrey Primatt and Jeremy Bentham. Like Hutcheson, they emphasize that the ability to suffer, not reason or speech, is the relevant criterion for moral consideration. His work thus represents an early and significant contribution to the intellectual history of animal ethics.

== Other works ==
In addition to the works named, the following were published during Hutcheson's lifetime: a pamphlet entitled Considerations on Patronage (1735); Philosophiae moralis institutio compendiaria, ethices et jurisprudentiae naturalis elementa continens, lib. iii. (Glasgow, 1742); Metaphysicae synopsis ontologiam et pneumatologiam campleciens (Glasgow, 1742). The last work was published anonymously. After his death, his son, Francis Hutcheson published much the longest of his works, A System of Moral Philosophy, in Three Books (2 vols. London, 1755). To this is prefixed a life of the author, by Dr William Leechman, professor of divinity in the University of Glasgow. His Reflections Upon Laughter: And Remarks Upon the Fable of the Bees was published in 1750. The only remaining work assigned to Hutcheson is a small treatise on Logic (Glasgow, 1764). This compendium, together with the Compendium of Metaphysics, was republished at Strasbourg in 1722.

Thus Hutcheson dealt with metaphysics, logic and ethics. His importance is, however, due almost entirely to his ethical writings, and among these primarily to the four essays and the letters published during his time in Dublin. His standpoint has a negative and a positive aspect; he is in strong opposition to Thomas Hobbes and Bernard de Mandeville, and in fundamental agreement with Shaftesbury, whose name he very properly coupled with his own on the title page of the first two essays. Obvious and fundamental points of agreement between the two authors include the analogy drawn between beauty and virtue, the functions assigned to the moral sense, the position that the benevolent feelings form an original and irreducible part of our nature, and the unhesitating adoption of the principle that the test of virtuous action is its tendency to promote the general welfare.

== Later scholarly mention ==
References to Hutcheson occur in histories, both of general philosophy and of moral philosophy, as, for instance, in part 7 of Adam Smith's Theory of Moral Sentiments.

Other writings include:

- Mackintosh's Progress of Ethical Philosophy;
- Cousin, Cours d'histoire de la philosophie morale du XVIII' siècle;
- Whewell's Lectures on the History of Moral Philosophy in England;
- Alexander Bain's Mental and Moral Science;
- Noah Porter's appendix to the English translation of Ueberweg's History of Philosophy;
- Sir Leslie Stephen's History of English Thought in the Eighteenth Century, etc. (Note: See also Martineau, Types of Ethical Theory (London, 1902); WR Scott, Francis Hutcheson (Cambridge, 1900); Albee, History of English Utilitarianism (London, 1902); T Fowler, Shaftesbury and Hutcheson (London, 1882); J McCosh, Scottish Philosophy (New York, 1874) and William Leechman's biography of Hutcheson. John Veitch gives an interesting account of his professorial work in Glasgow, Mind, ii. 209–12.)

== Influence in colonial America ==
Norman Fiering, a specialist in the intellectual history of colonial New England, has described Francis Hutcheson as "probably the most influential and respected moral philosopher in America in the eighteenth century". Hutcheson's early Inquiry into the Original of Our Ideas of Beauty and Virtue, introducing his perennial association of "unalienable rights" with the collective right to resist oppressive government, was used at Harvard College as a textbook as early as the 1730s. In 1761, Hutcheson was publicly endorsed in the annual semi-official Massachusetts Election Sermon as "an approved writer on ethics." Hutcheson's Short Introduction to Moral Philosophy was used as a textbook at the College of Philadelphia in the 1760s. Francis Alison, the professor of moral philosophy at the College of Philadelphia, was a former student of Hutcheson who closely followed Hutcheson's thought. Alison's students included "a surprisingly large number of active, well-known patriots", including three signers of the Declaration of Independence, who "learned their patriotic principles from Hutcheson and Alison". Another signer of the Declaration of Independence, John Witherspoon of the College of New Jersey (now Princeton University), relied heavily on Hutcheson's views in his own lectures on moral philosophy.

John Adams read Hutcheson's Short Introduction to Moral Philosophy shortly after graduating from Harvard. Garry Wills argued in 1978 that the phrasing of the Declaration of Independence was due largely to Hutcheson's influence, but Wills's work suffered a scathing rebuttal from Ronald Hamowy. Wills' view has been partially supported by Samuel Fleischacker, who agreed that it is "perfectly reasonable to see Hutcheson's influence behind the appeals to sentiment that Jefferson put into his draft of the Declaration...".

== See also ==
- List of abolitionist forerunners

== Sources ==
- Smith, George H. (2008). "Hutcheson, Francis (1694–1746)". In Hamowy, Ronald (ed.). The Encyclopedia of Libertarianism. Thousand Oaks, CA: SAGE; Cato Institute. pp. 231–32. doi:10.4135/9781412965811.n143. ISBN 978-1-4129-6580-4. LCCN 2008009151. OCLC 750831024.
