= Eudalt Serra =

Spanish composer

Eudalt Serra was a Spanish composer of music.

== Works ==
- A la Verge Santíssima: Dues Lletretes a Una Veu (Sia Vostra Gran Puresa, Oració a Maria) (1908)
- Nostra Seynora de la Mercè
