= Antoni Arabí =

Spanish footballer and politician

Personal information
- Full name: Antoni Arabí i Serra
- Date of birth: 13 November 1953 (age 72)
- Place of birth: Sant Antoni de Portmany, Spain
- Height: 1.77 m (5 ft 10 in)
- Position: Wingback

Senior career*
Years	Team	Apps	(Gls)
1970–1974	Portmany		
1974–1978	Ibiza		
1978–1986	RCD Espanyol	173	(7)
1986–1987	Ibiza		
1987	Portmany		
- * Club domestic league appearances and goals

Antoni Arabí i Serra (born 13 November 1953) is a Spanish retired footballer who played as a right wingback. He is also a politician for the Balearic Islands' People's Party.

== Football career ==
Born in Sant Antoni de Portmany, Eivissa, Balearic Islands, Arabí began his career with local SD Portmany and also represented neighbouring SD Eivissa in his early years, winning promotion to Segunda División B in 1978 with the latter. He moved straight into La Liga after that achievement, signing for RCD Espanyol in June.

Arabí made his official debut for the Catalans on 9 September 1978, playing the last 19 minutes in a 1–0 home win against Sporting de Gijón. He scored his first goal on 29 October, but in a 3–4 away loss against Sevilla FC.

Initially a midfielder, Arabí was converted to a right wingback in 1980 by manager José María Maguregui. At the start of the 1982–83 season he was appointed captain, replacing CE Sabadell FC-bound Marañon.

In August 1986, after suffering a severe knee injury in a Copa del Rey match on 8 May, Arabí returned to Eivissa. He appeared in more than 200 official games with the Pericos during his eight-year tenure, being subsequently honoured by fans and club.

Arabí retired with his first club Portmany in 1987, aged 34.

== Political career ==
After his retirement, Arabí worked as an athletic director and coach, managing the likes of Portmany SD, CF Sant Rafel and SCR Peña Deportiva. He was also active in the conservative People's Party of the Balearic Islands.
