= Frederic Louis Norden =

Danish sailor

Frederik Ludvig Norden
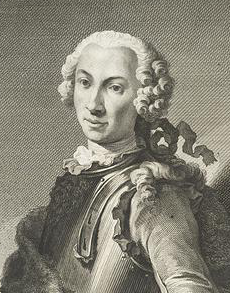
- Frederic Louis Norden, from Voyage d'Egypte et de Nubie, 1755
- Born: 22 October 1708; Glückstadt, Schleswig-Holstein
- Died: 22 September 1742 (aged 33); Paris, France

Frederik Ludvig Norden (22 October 1708 – 22 September 1742) was a Danish naval captain, cartographer, and archaeological explorer. His given names were written in a variety of ways depending on the language of publication, including Frederic Louis, Friderik Ludwig, Frederik Ludvig, and Frederick Lewis. He is the author in French of one of the very first travelogues about Egypt, Voyage d'Egypte et de Nubie, written half a century before Napoleon's expedition (1798–1801).

Norden came from a military family and entered the Royal Danish Naval Academy at the age of 13. Having excelled there in illustration he directed to travel abroad and gather information to be sent back to Denmark. He travelled extensively through the Netherlands from 1732–1734, Italy from 1734–1737, and most famously from Egypt through Sudan and Ethiopia in 1737–1738.

== Early life and education ==
Frederik Ludvig Norden was born in Holstein-Glückstadt on 22 October 1708 to Catherine Henrichsen of Rendsburg and Jørgen Norden. At the time, his father was an artillery Captain; he would become a Lieutenant colonel before his death in 1728. Frederik Ludvig was one of five sons.

Norden entered the Royal Danish Naval Academy at Copenhagen in 1722 where he became a cadet in 1723. While at the Naval Academy, Norden excelled at illustration. He was ordered to retouch and repair a collection of maps belonging to the king in 1727.

== Career ==
At the recommendation of Frederik Danneskiold-Samsøe, he applied to the king to travel abroad to undertake further training in 1732 and was promoted as a second lieutenant. He was permitted to study abroad alongside Lieutenant Frederik Wegersløff to study foreign fortifications and water engineering while producing illustrations. Norden's first journey was to the Netherlands where he remained from 1732–1734 studying the maintenance of levees. While there, he became acquainted with the artist Jan de Ruyter, who taught him engraving techniques. In May 1734 he continued on to Italy, where was introduced with Ancient Egyptian art and culture by the archaeologist Philippe Baron de Stosch.

In 1737, Norden left Italy for Egypt on orders to collect as much information for about the region as possible for the monarchy. His expedition first reached Alexandria before staying in Cairo for about four months. They then departed on the Nile for Ethiopia. At the request of King Christian VI of Denmark, he was to enter into a trade agreement with Ethiopia on behalf of Denmark. Norden made abundant notes, observations and drawings of everything around him, including people, pharaonic monuments, architecture, installations and maps. In 1738, he and the expedition returned to Denmark.

Back in Denmark, Norden was appointed to the commission overseeing the navy's shipbuilding. In 1740, he followed orders to take part in the War of the Austrian Succession aboard the English fleet under. A chest infection, however, forced him to remain in England instead of with the fleet. On 8 January 1741 he became a Fellow of the Royal Society of London (registered as Frederic Lewis Norden). The society published a sample of his work that year in Drawings of some ruins and colossal statues at Thebes in Egypt.

He died of tuberculosis in Paris while on a tour of France on 22 September 1742. Norden had prepared the publication of his travel notes all of which were published in the posthumous Voyage d'Egypte et de Nubie (Copenhagen, 1755). Carl Marcus Tuscher made the drawings into copperplates for the publication. In 1757 an English edition was published, followed by a 1779 German edition, and a 1795 French edition.

== Drawing from Voyage d'Egypte et de Nubie ==
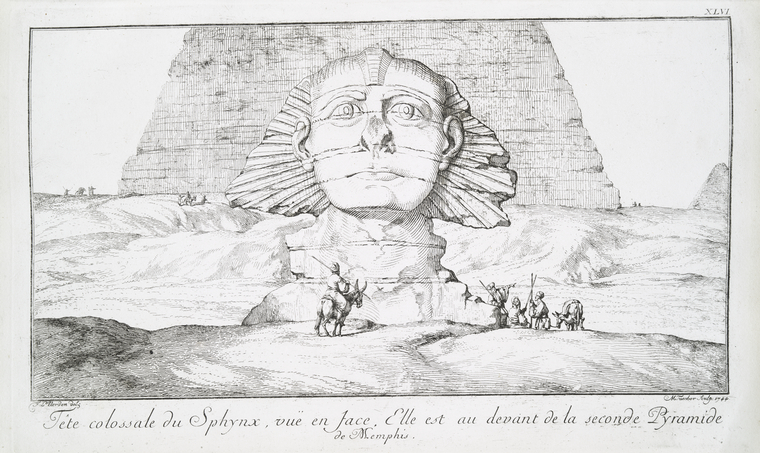
Voyage d'Egypte et de Nubie (1795).
Head of the Sphinx of Giza by Norden, one of the first realistic representations published; the nose was missing in 1755.

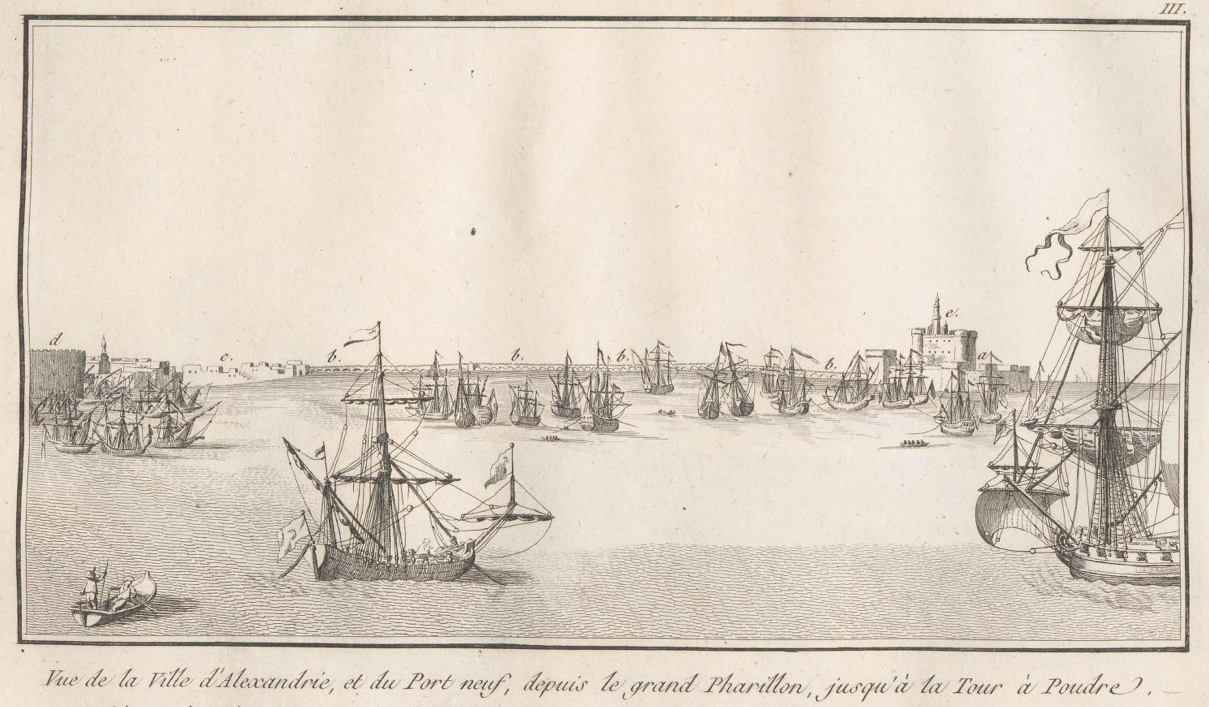
Voyage d'Egypte et de Nubie
(1795) Paris: Pierre Didot l'aine

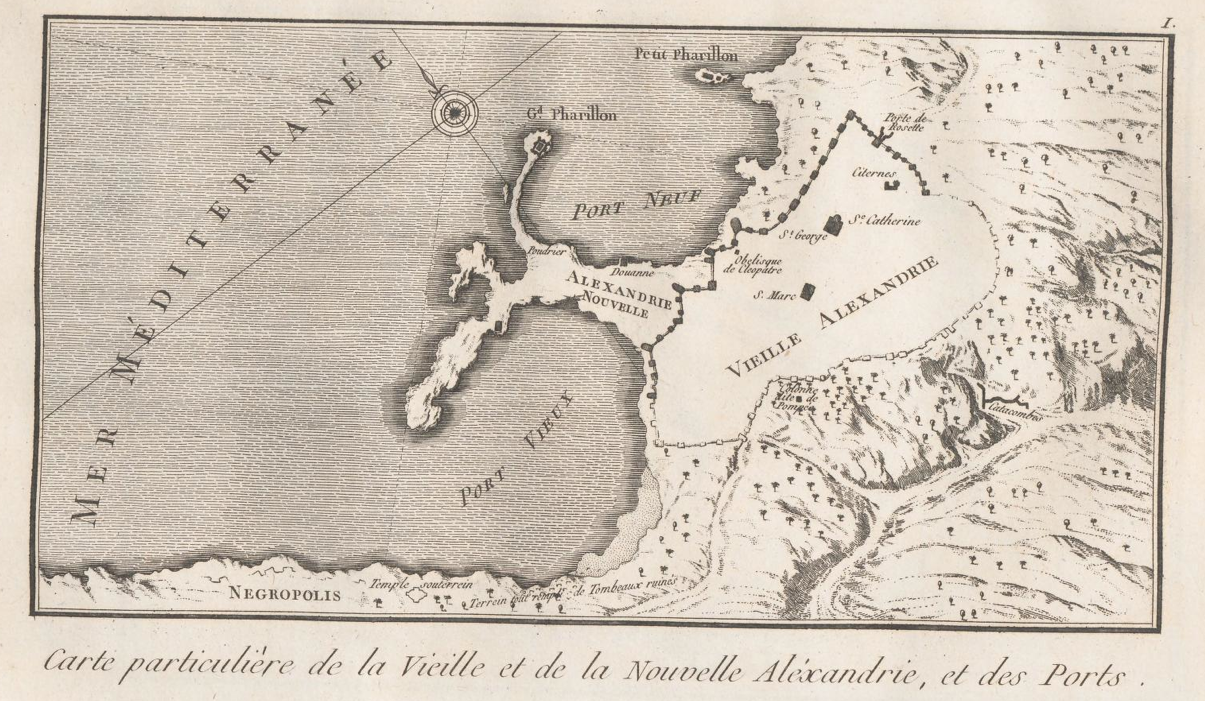
Voyage d'Egypte et de Nubie
(1795) Paris: Pierre Didot l'aine

== Additional reading ==
- Buhl, Marie-Louise, et al.: The Danish Naval Officer, Frederik Ludvig Norden, (Royal Danish Academy of Sciences and Letters: Copenhagen, 1986) ISBN 87-7304-168-8.
- Norden, Frederic Louis (1755). Voyage d'Egypte et de Nubie (in French). Archived from the original on 21 December 2004.
- Norden, Frederik Ludvig (1741). Drawings of some ruins and colossal statues at Thebes in Egypt : with an account of the same in a letter to the Royal Society. London.
