= Antoni Serra Serra =

Spanish religious writer

Antoni Serra Serra (1708–1755) was a religious writer and member of the Order of Minims.

Serra was born in Sa Pobla. He was in the Convent of Saint Francis of Pauoa of Palma and was a Reader of philosophy and theology, Visitor, Mallorca's Order of Minims General and Provincial Vicar Inquisition Qualifier; Postulator in 1739 of the cause of beatification of Catherine Thomas. He died in Palma, Majorca, aged about 47.

== Works ==
- De vita moribus et miraculis Catharine Thomas expositio. Ms.
- Mística centella de la caridad ideada en el amoroso incendio con que en aras de la caridad ardia siempre el corazón abrasado del gran Padre y Patriarca San Pedro Nolasco... 1731
- Mística carroça de Ezequiel noble sabia universidad. Solemne novenario... 1737.

== Bibliography ==
- Sa Marjal, Vol. IV, Tom VII, ed. facsímil, 1990, Ajuntament de sa Pobla
