= Richard of Clapwell =

English Thomist philosopher (fl. 1285)

Richard of Clapwell (fl. 1285) was a British Thomist philosopher at Oxford.
