= Thomas Blantyre Simpson =

Scottish advocate and sheriff

Thomas Blantyre Simpson QC FRSE (27 July 1892 – 18 October 1954) was a Scottish advocate and sheriff.

== Life ==
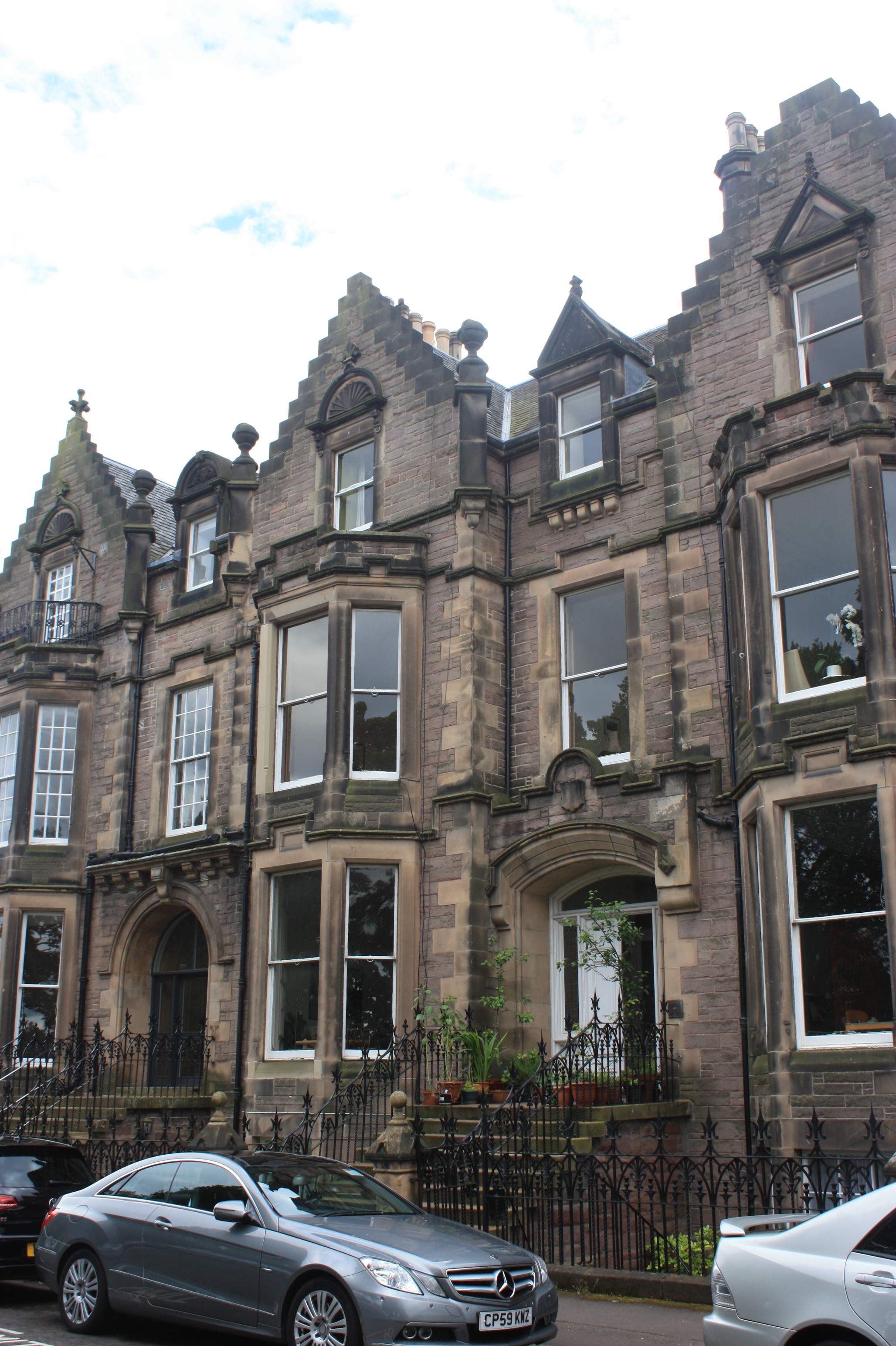
Bruntsfield Crescent, Edinburgh

He was born at 8 Bruntsfield Crescent in Edinburgh the son of Sir Robert Russell Simpson (1840-1923) and his wife, Helen Dymock Raleigh.

He was educated at Edinburgh Academy (1900 to 1911) then studied law at Oxford University.

In the First World War he was commissioned into the Royal Scots, rising to the rank of captain. He completed his Law studies after the war and qualified as an advocate in 1921.

He was Treasurer of the Faculty of Advocates 1937 to 1954. In 1944, he became King's Counsel and on the coronation of Queen Elizabeth was Queen's Counsel.

In 1952 he was elected a Fellow of the Royal Society of Edinburgh. His proposers were Thomas Cooper, 1st Baron Cooper of Culross, David King Murray, Lord Birnam, John Cameron, Lord Cameron and Douglas Guthrie.

He was Sheriff variously of Caithness, Sutherland, Orkney and finally Perth and Angus.

He died on 18 October 1954, aged 62, whilst still in office. He was unmarried and had no children.

== Publications ==
- The Wagering Club and the Memory of Bain Whyt (1951)

== Family ==
His great uncle was James Young Simpson. His maternal great uncle was Samuel Raleigh an eminent accountant.

His paternal uncle was Alexander Russell Simpson and his cousins were James Young Simpson and George Freeland Barbour Simpson.
