= David Berry Hart =

Scottish gynaecological surgeon and academic

David Berry Hart FRSE FRCPE
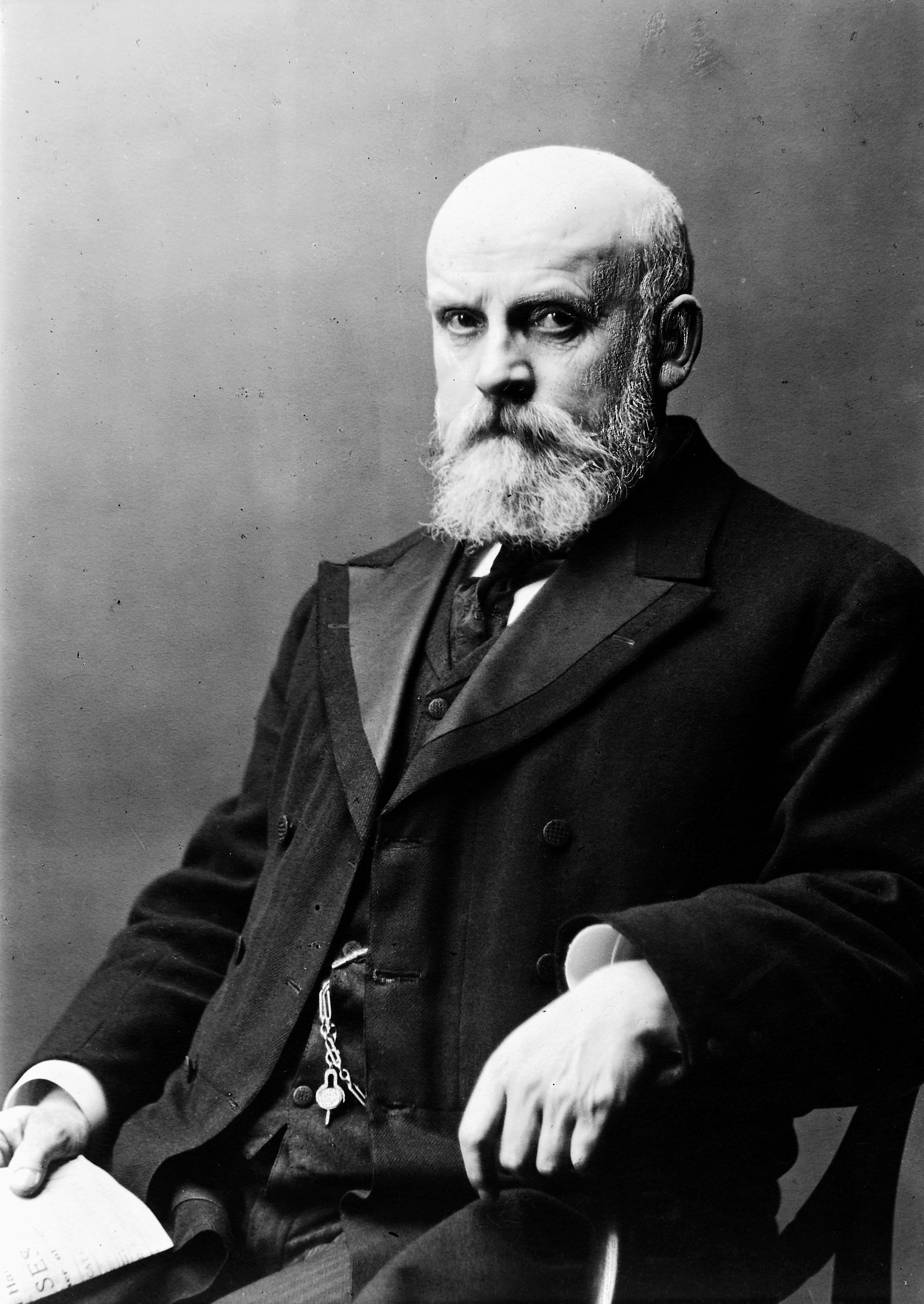
- Portrait of David Berry Hart
- Born: October 12, 1851; Edinburgh, Scotland
- Died: June 10, 1920 (aged 68); Edinburgh, Scotland

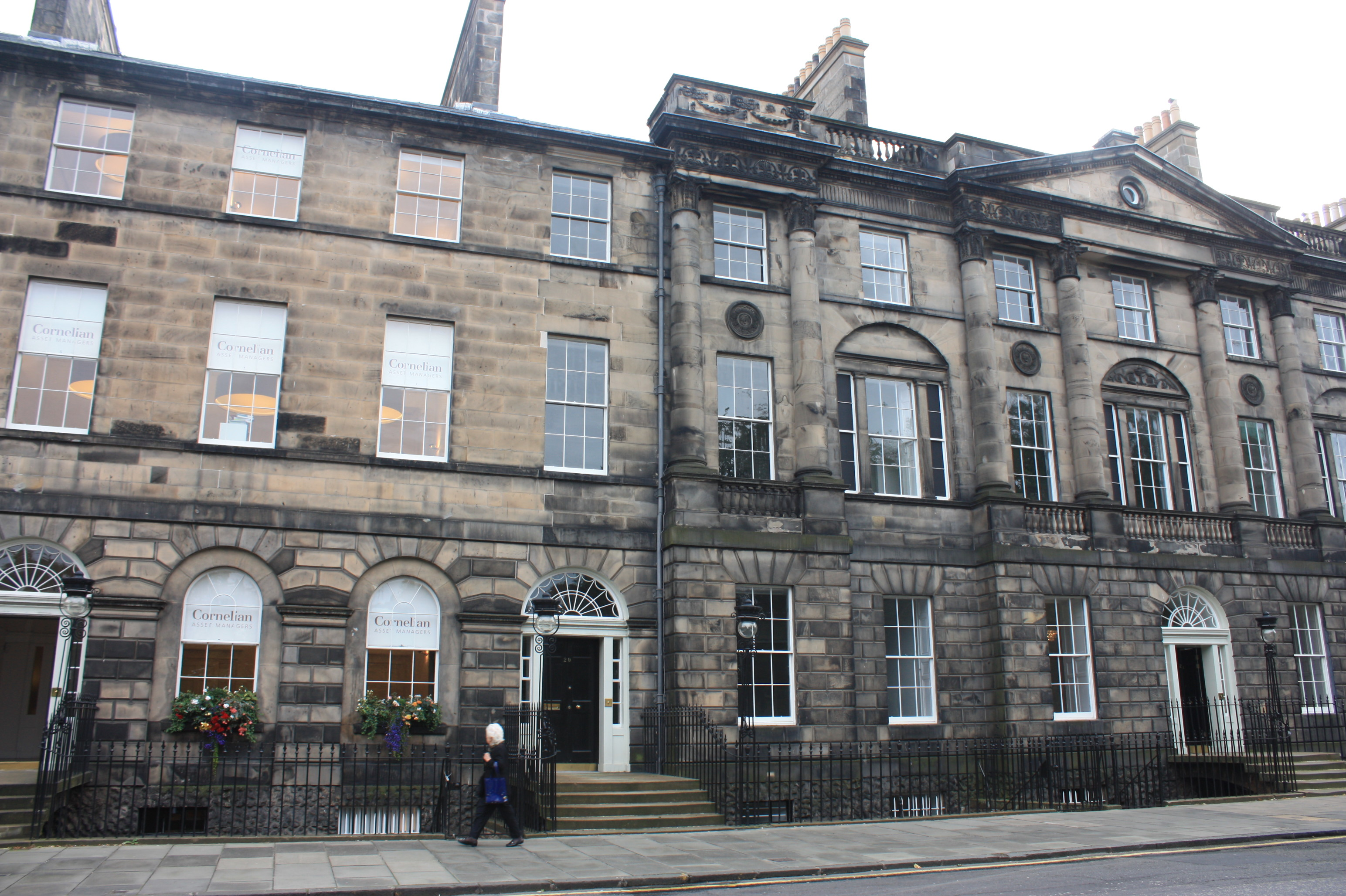
29 Charlotte Square, Edinburgh

David Berry Hart (12 October 1851 – 10 June 1920) was a Scottish gynaecological surgeon and academic.

== Life ==
David Berry Hart was born in Edinburgh on 12 October 1851.

He graduated M.B., C.M. from the University of Edinburgh in 1877. Specialising in obstetrics and gynaecology, he continued his studies and obtained his doctorate MD in 1880, with a gold medal and the Syme Surgical Fellowship on "The Structural Anatomy of the female pelvic floor".

He was Secretary of the Edinburgh Obstetrical Society between 1879 and 1883 and became President in 1890. He was also Librarian to the Royal College of Physicians of Edinburgh. In 1881 he was elected a member of the Harveian Society of Edinburgh. In 1888 he was elected a Fellow of the Royal Society of Edinburgh. His proposers were Andrew Douglas Maclagan, Sir Alexander Russell Simpson, Sir William Turner, and Sir German Sims Woodhead.

Dr Hart lived in an exceptionally fine Georgian townhouse designed by Robert Adam at 29 Charlotte Square in Edinburgh's First New Town.

He was an examiner in midwifery in the universities of Edinburgh, Oxford, Birmingham and Liverpool.

He was devoted to Liberalism and the United Free Church of Scotland.

In later life he lived at 5 Randolph Cliff on the edge of the Moray Estate in Edinburgh's affluent West End.

He died in Edinburgh on 10 June 1920.

== Family ==
His maternal grandfather, David Berry, had been a builder in Edinburgh.

His wife was Jessie Smith Welsh Berry, a first cousin, and they had two daughters and two sons.

A granddaughter was Marian Lines, a writer and actress, and his grandson David Berry-Hart, painter and sculptor.

A great-grandchild is Tess Berry-Hart, playwright and novelist.

== Professional interests ==
Professor Hart wrote nine books and more than 70 papers. Among these were "Manual of Gynaecology", "Guide to Midwifery" and "Some Phases of Evolution". He contributed an article on "Hermaphrodism in Man" for "Encyclopaedia Medica".

Regarded by others as a tour de force of dubious utility, he drew on Mendelian principles with singular vigour. The sides of the vulval vestibule are visible as Hart’s line on the inside of the inner lips. Hart's line is the outer edge of the area and marks the change from vulvar skin to the smoother transitional skin of the vulva.

== Honours ==
- Honorary Fellow of the American Gynaecological Society
- Honorary Fellow of the Berlin Obstetrical Society German. ″Gesellschaft für Geburtshilfe und Gynäkologie in Berlin (GGG)″
- Corresponding Fellow of the Leipzig Obstetrical Society, German. ″Gesellschaft für Geburtshilfe zu Leipzig″

== Publications ==
- Manual of Gynaecology (2 volumes), co-written with Alexander Hugh Freeland Barbour (1882 + 1891)
- Atlas of the Female Pelvic Anatomy (1884)
- Phases of Evolution and Heredity (1910)
- Guide to Midwifery (1912)
