= George Freeland Barbour Simpson =

Scottish physician and gynaecologist

George Freeland Barbour Simpson FRSE FRCPE FRCSE JP (21 September 1874 – 8 April 1958) was a 20th-century Scottish physician and gynaecologist. In 1913 he served as President of the Obstetrical Society of Edinburgh.

== Life ==
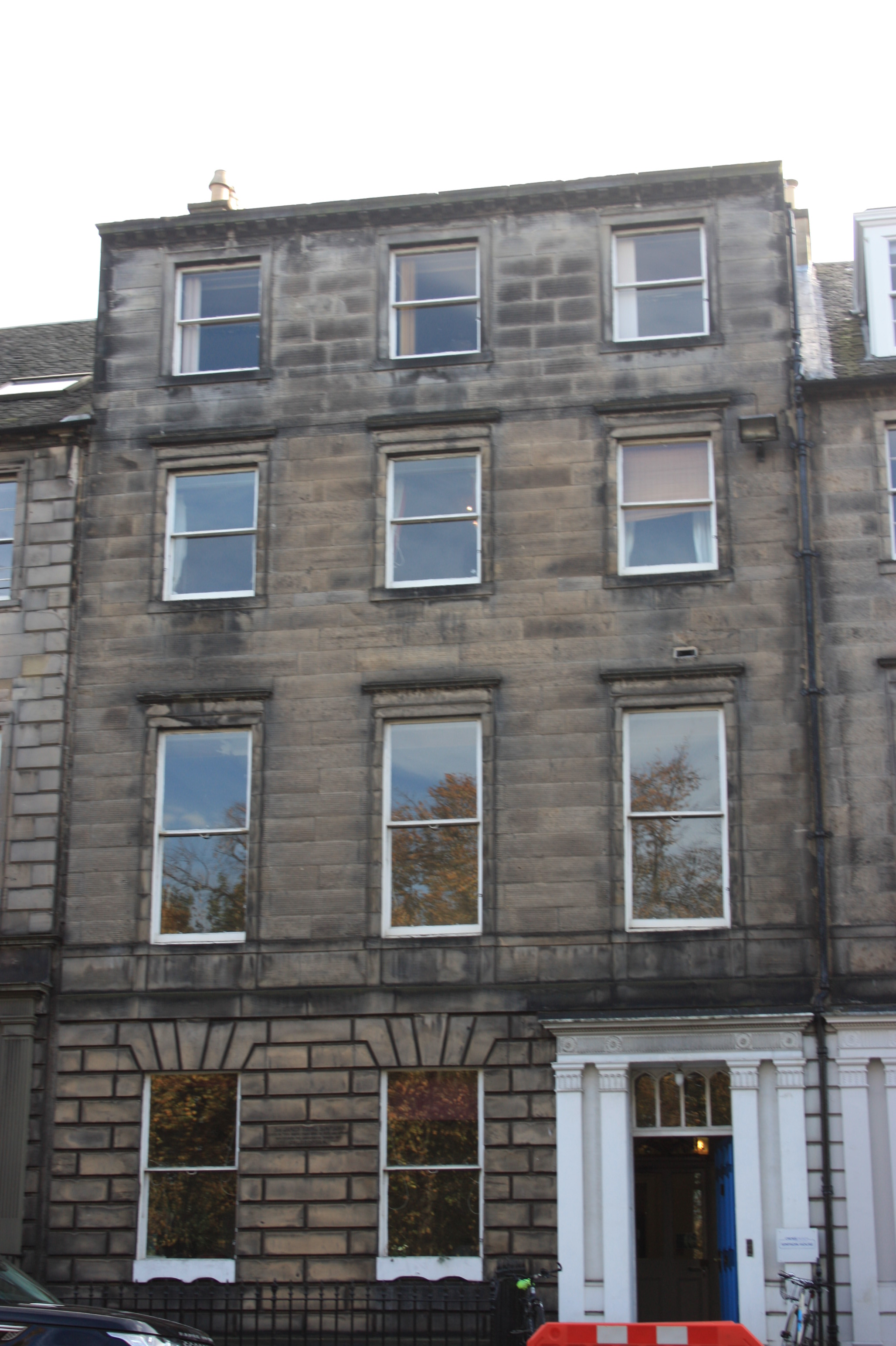
52 Queen Street, Edinburgh

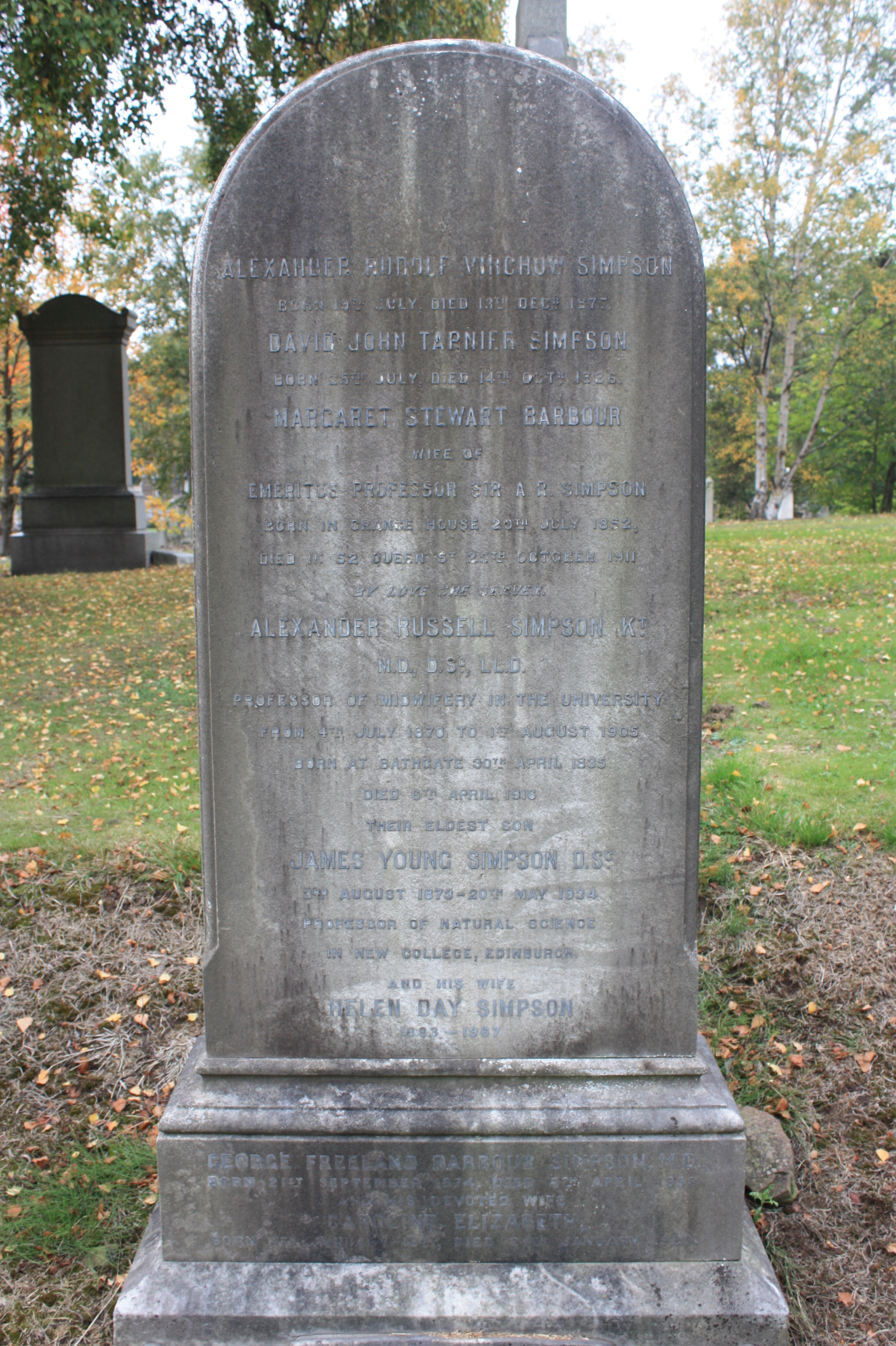
The grave of Alexander Russell Simpson, Grange Cemetery, Edinburgh

He was born on 21 September 1874 at 52 Queen Street in Edinburgh the son of Margaret Stewart Barbour, sister of Alexander Hugh Freeland Barbour, and her husband Alexander Russell Simpson. The house where they lived had been inherited on the death of his great uncle, James Young Simpson.

He was educated at George Watson's College (1884-1892), and then studied medicine at the University of Edinburgh, graduating with an MB ChB in 1898 and gaining his MD in 1905.

He followed in his father's shoes as head Physician of the Simpson Maternity Hospital in Edinburgh (named after his great uncle). He also lectured in gynaecology at the University of Edinburgh.

In 1908 he was elected a Fellow of the Royal Society of Edinburgh. His proposers were Daniel John Cunningham, Alexander Crum Brown, James Cossar Ewart and Cargill Gilston Knott. In 1911 he was elected a member of the Harveian Society of Edinburgh.

During World War I he served as a Major in the Royal Army Medical Corps. He died at home, 5 Randolph Cliff in Edinburgh on 8 April 1958.

== Family ==
In 1899, he married his cousin Caroline Elizabeth Barbour. Their children included Alexander Rudolph Barbour Simpson (1900-1977).

His brother was the scientist James Young Simpson, and his cousin the politician George Freeland Barbour.

His daughter, Margaret E. B. Simpson, is considered the first professional woman archaeologist in Scotland.

== Publications ==
- The Edinburgh Stereoscopic Atlas of Obstetrics (1909) a curious 3D medical book
