= Xiaochangliang =

Archaeological site in Hebei, China

- location in China
- 40.1167°N 114.1667°E
- Periods: Paleolithic China
- Location: Hebei
- Region: China

History
- Built: 1.36 mya

Xiaochangliang (simplified Chinese: 小长梁; traditional Chinese: 小長梁; pinyin: Xiǎochángliáng) is the site of some of the earliest Paleolithic remains in East Asia, located in the Nihewan (泥河灣) Basin in Yangyuan County, Hebei, China, most famous for the stone tools discovered there.

== Stone tools ==
Stone tools discovered at the Xiaochangliang site

The tool forms discovered include side and end scrapers, notches, burins, and disc cores. Although it is generally more difficult to date Asian sites than African sites because Asian sites typically lack volcanic materials that can be dated isotropically, the age of the tools has been magnetostratigraphically dated as 1.36 million years. This method hinges upon dated reversals in the Earth's magnetic field.

== Research ==
The site was first discovered by the Scottish geologist George Barbour in 1923. He was amazed when he saw the ancient sediments from the lake. Although he guessed wrong about how old they were and found basically nothing, Barbour invited Pere Licent and Pierre Teilhard de Chardin, two of the most brilliant prehistoric archaeologists of that time, for a visit.

Licent and Chardin not only pushed the sediment's age to over a million years but also found, among many things, a flint tool. It was the oldest stone tool found at the time - so old, in fact, that even Chardin himself had suspicions about its authenticity. Barbour invited French archaeologists Pierre Teilhard de Chardin and Émile Licent. In 1935 Teilhard found a stone (flint) tool and determined the age of the site to be over a million years – it was the oldest artefact then known. Many scientists, including Teilhard, debated whether this tool might not be naturally formed.

The discovery by Pei Wenzhong of Peking Man hundreds of kilometers to the south (followed by wars and revolution) distracted the attention of the world's scientific community. However, from 1972 to 1978 more than 2000 pieces of stone tools were discovered, together with some bone tools, which confirmed Xiaochangliang (or Nihewan) as a Paleolithic site.

In the basin, Archaeologists have identified 40 "million year old sites".

In 1982, Wei Qi (衛奇), then 44, found a huge hominid settlement at Donggutuo (東谷坨) Village. He took samples to Pei, whose Peking Man was not half as old. "He said nothing," said Wei. "But I guess he had accepted it." Pei died of a heart attack a few days later.
