= Margaret E. B. Simpson =

Scottish archaeologist (1906–1994)

- Born: 13 October 1906
- Died: 1 November 1994 (aged 88)
- Education: University of Edinburgh
- Occupation: Archaeologist
- Known for: The first professional woman archaeologist in Scotland
- Parents: George Freeland Barbour Simpson MD FRCPE FRCSE (father); Caroline Elizabeth Barbour (mother)

Margaret Eleanor Barbour Simpson, FSA Scot (13 October 1906 – 1 November 1994) was a Scottish archaeologist. She is considered as the first professional woman archaeologist in Scotland. She was a member of V. Gordon Childe's team of archaeologists at Skara Brae and Kindrochat, as well as the writer of some of the first guidebooks for state-owned historic properties in Scotland.

== Early life ==
Margaret Simpson grew up in Edinburgh, within a family of medics. She was the daughter of George Freeland Barbour Simpson, a Scottish physician, and Caroline Elizabeth Barbour, the granddaughter of Sir Alexander Russell Simpson (1838-1916), and the great-great niece of Sir James Young Simpson (1811-1870).

== Personal life ==
In 1941, Simpson married Frederick Root, private secretary to the First Commissioner of Works, at St. Giles Cathedral in Edinburgh. The couple lived in London before moving to Surrey in 1944. They had a daughter called Marilyn Ainslie. Simpson died at Haslemere, Surrey, on 1 November 1994.

University of Edinburgh Cimer

== Education ==
Simpson matriculated (began studying) at the University of Edinburgh in 1925. From 1928 to 1929, she attended an archaeology class taught by Gordon Childe, entitled the First Ordinary Archaeology Class. Throughout her university degree, she participated in excavations at Kindrochat and Skara Brae in Orkney, under Professor Gordon Childe.

== Career ==
From 1929-30 she was the first secretary of the Edinburgh League of Prehistorians. She was elected as a Fellow of the Society of Antiquaries of Scotland in 1930.

In June 1930, Simpson applied for a post as the Assistant Inspector of Ancient Monuments in the Ministry of Works. In a letter to Simpson, regarding her application, Gordon Childe wrote: "I am really very keen that they should get the right person and I think that you are it. It's good to have a woman." Childe went on to recommended her for the job, writing '... I know of no one better qualified for it. Miss Simpson has not only a sound grounding in the principle of archaeology... but also other rare qualifications...' Margaret was successful in her application and held the post until 1948. In doing so, Margaret became the first of Childe's student to obtain permanent employment in archaeology and so has been dubbed the first professional female archaeologist in Scotland. Her work involved the maintenance of monuments and the scheduling of ancient monuments.

== Archaeology ==
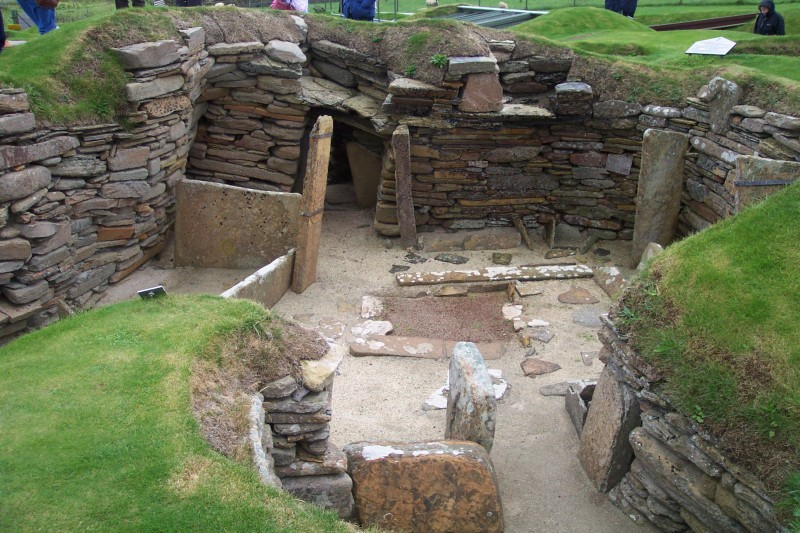
Skara Brae

=== Skara Brae Excavation 1927-1930 ===
Simpson participated in the excavation at Skara Brae, led by Prof. Gordon Childe in the years 1927–1930, and was later acknowledged by him in a monograph on the subject. She also features in several photographs from the excavation (currently in the collection of Orkney Library and Archive), along with other female archaeologists (Margaret Mitchell, Mary Kennedy, and Dame Margaret Cole). They were initially considered to be either tourists or local women visiting the site, but are now identified as Prof. Childe's students and members of his excavation crew.

=== Kindrochat Excavation 1929-1930 ===
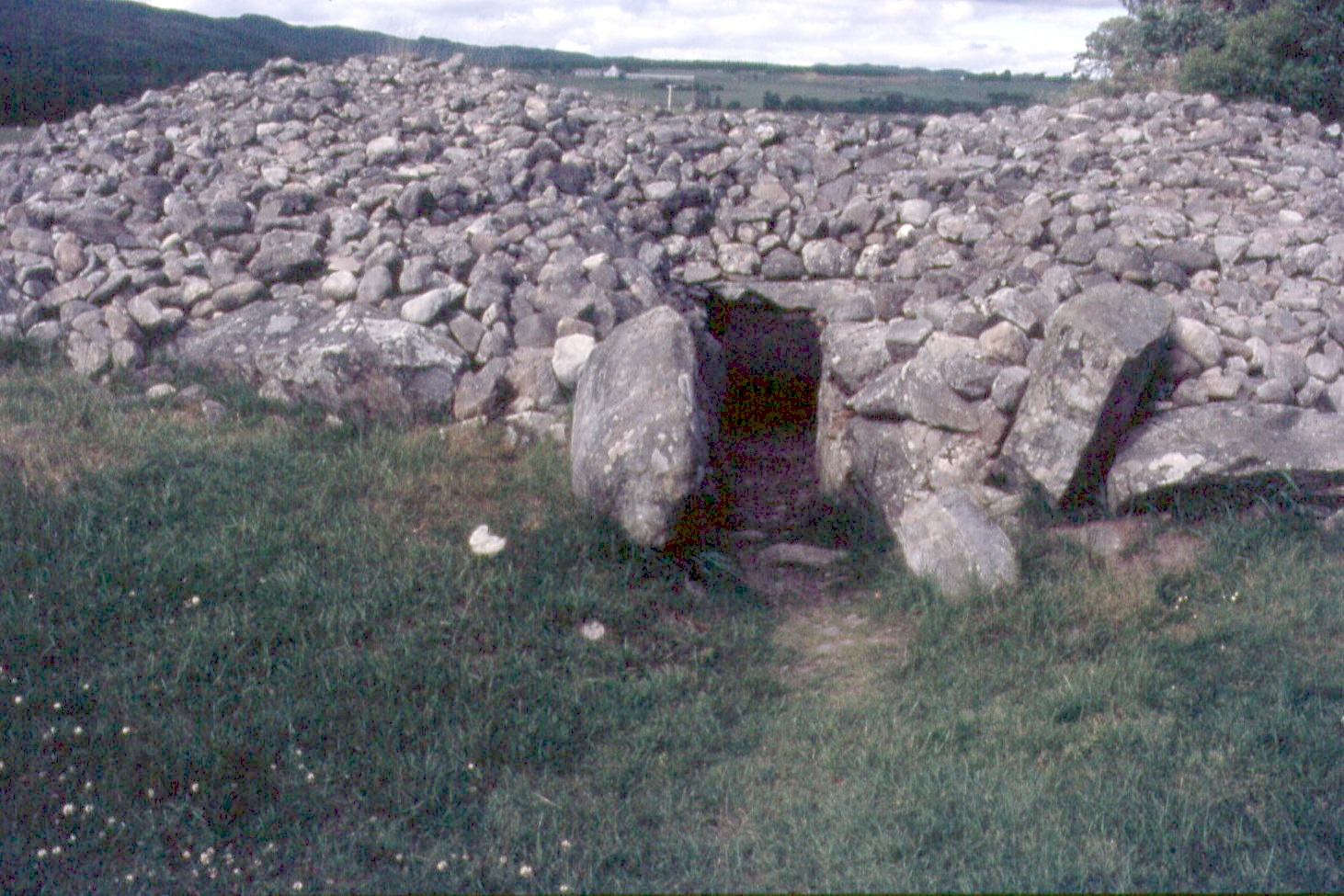
Example of a Chambered Cairn - Corrimony Chambered Cairn

In 1929 Simpson was also one of the team of archaeologists who excavated the chambered cairn at Kindrochat (aka Kindrochet) in Perthshire, once more under the leadership of Gordon Childe. In his later correspondence he wrote that "she was entrusted with the examination of one of the megalithic chambers and produced, quite unaided, an excellent plan with elevations." Her drawings and observations can be found in the Proceedings of the Society of Antiquaries of Scotland.

=== Guidebooks ===
Simpson used her communication and writing skills to create some of the first guidebooks for state-owned properties in Scotland with James Richardson. These include Stirling and Balvenie Castles (1936) and Inchmahome Priory (1936) with Richardson, and Dunkeld Cathedral (1935) as a sole author.

== Selected publications ==
- The Cathedral of Dunkeld, Perthshire, Ancient monuments and historic buildings official guide. Margaret E. B. Simpson, Ministry of Works
- The Castle of Balvenie, Banffshire, Ancient monuments and historic buildings official guide. James Smith Richardson, Margaret E. B. Simpson, Ministry of Works
- The Priory of Inchmahome, Perthshire, Ancient monuments and historic buildings official guide. James Smith Richardson, Margaret E. B. Simpson, Ministry of Works

Some later editions were published under her changed name of Margaret E. Root.
