= A. H. Freeland Barbour =

Scottish gynecologist and medical author (1856–1927)

Alexander Hugh Freeland Barbour FRSE FRCPE
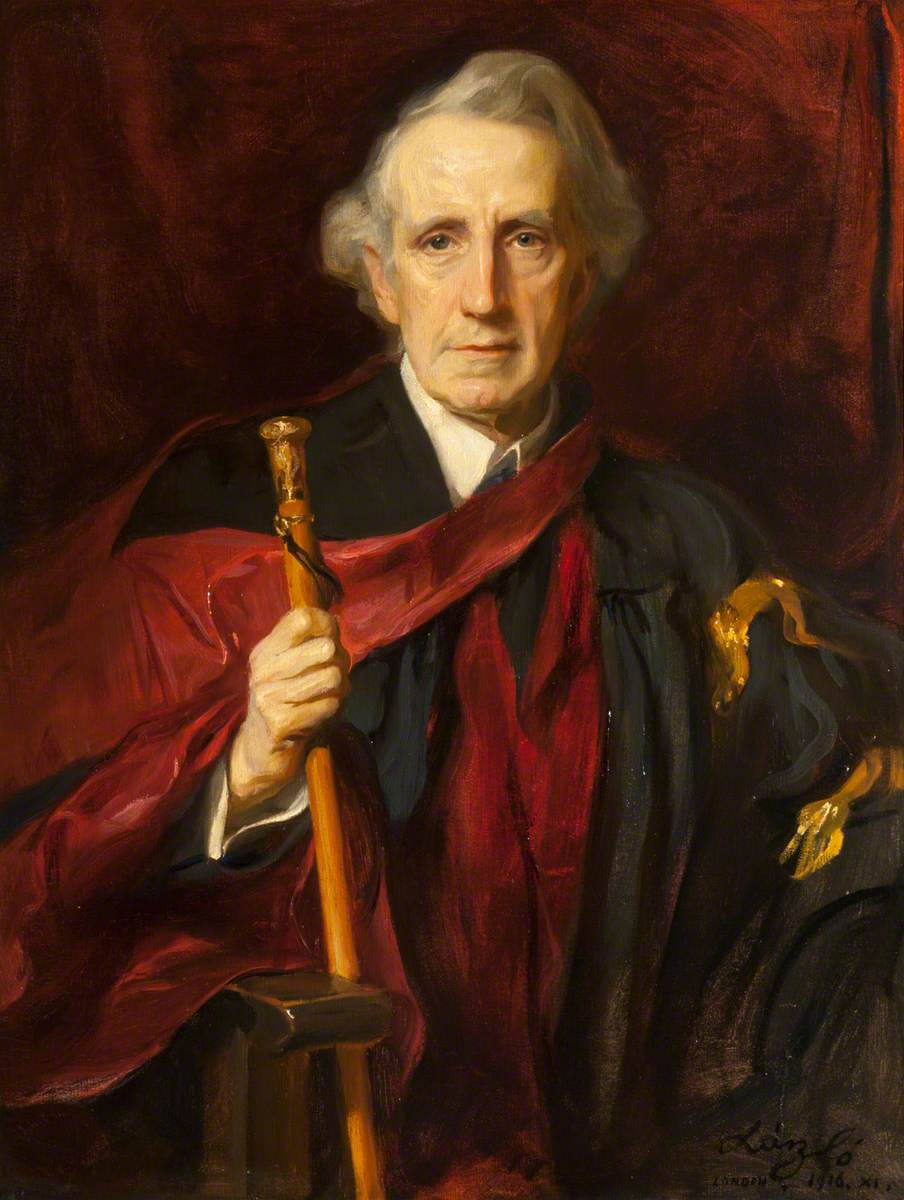
- Born: January 7, 1856; Edinburgh, Scotland
- Died: June 11, 1927 (aged 71); Edinburgh, Scotland
- Burial place: Dean Cemetery, Edinburgh
- Education: University of Edinburgh
- Title: President of the Royal College of Physicians of Edinburgh
- Term: 1914-1916
- Predecessor: John James Graham Brown
- Successor: William Russell
- Spouse: Margaret Nelson Brown (married 1889)
- Children: George Brown Barbour
- Parents: George Freeland Barbour; Margaret Fraser Sandeman
- Relatives: George Freeland Barbour Simpson (Nephew)

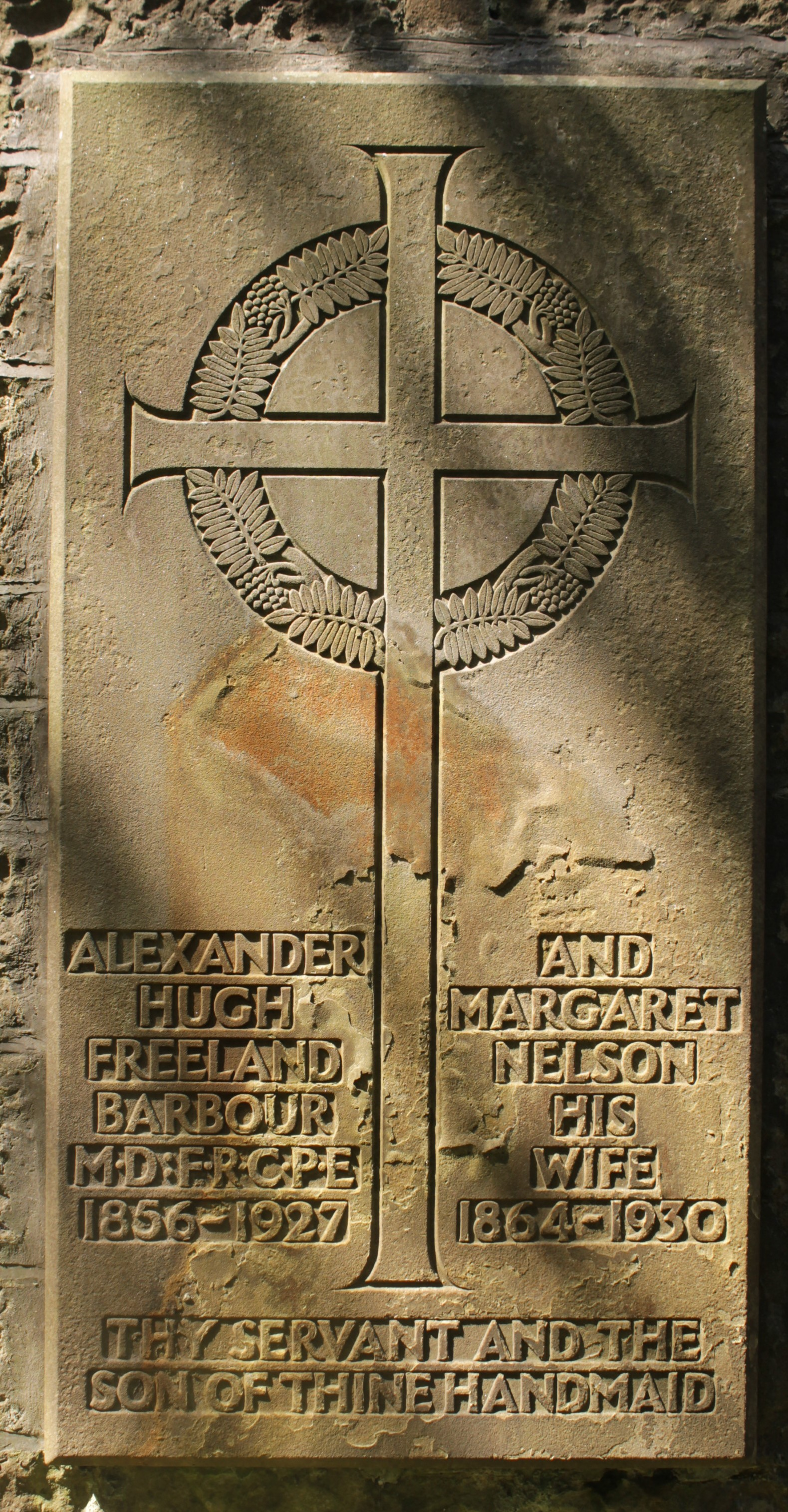
Grave of Alexander Hugh Freeland Barbour, Dean Cemetery

Alexander Hugh Freeland Barbour FRSE FRCPE (7 January 1856 – 11 June 1927) was a Scottish gynaecologist and noted medical author. He was President of the Royal College of Physicians of Edinburgh and co-author of the world-acclaimed Manual of Gynaecology.

== Life ==
Barbour was born on 7 January 1856 in Edinburgh, the youngest son of Margaret Fraser Sandeman and George Freeland Barbour of Bonskeid (1810-1887), a Director of the North British Railway.

He graduated from the University of Edinburgh with an MA and BSc in Natural Sciences, continuing at the University to study medicine. He graduated with an MD in 1884, having won a gold medal for his thesis On Spinal Deformity in relation to Obstetrics.

With his sister and others (including Patrick Geddes) Barbour co-founded the Edinburgh Social Union which restored housing areas such as Chessels Court (1897) and White Horse Close (1902) to new social ideals. He was President of the Royal College of Physicians of Edinburgh 1914 to 1916.

In later life he is listed as living at 4 Charlotte Square, an elite Edinburgh address. He died in Edinburgh and was buried in Dean Cemetery on the lower concealed south terrace.

== Family ==
In 1889 he married Margaret Nelson Brown (1864-1930). Their son George Brown Barbour (1890-1977) became a geologist, spending time in America and China, and is known as the discoverer of the Xiaochangliang site.

Barbour's sister, Margaret Stewart Barbour, married Alexander Russell Simpson. Their son was George Freeland Barbour Simpson. Alexander Russell Simpson was a near neighbour to Barbour, living at 52 Queen Street.

== Religious affiliations ==
Barbour was for 40 years an elder at St George's United Free Church, Edinburgh, ministered by his brother-in-law Dr Alexander Whyte, having joined the church when a student. He was president of the Scottish Auxiliary of the China Mission of the Presbyterian Church of England, succeeding his father.

== Publications ==
- The Anatomy of Labour (1889)
- Manual of Gynaecology (2 volumes) co-written with Dr David Berry Hart (1882)
- Gynaecological Diagnosis and Treatment, co-written with Benjamin P. Watson (1913)

Academic offices
Preceded by John Joseph Graham Brown	President of the Royal College of Physicians of Edinburgh; 1914–1916	Succeeded by William Russell
