= George Brown Barbour =

Scottish geologist and educator

George Brown Barbour FGS FRSE FRSSA (1890–1977) was a Scottish geologist and educator.

== Life ==
He was born on August 22, 1890, in Edinburgh, Scotland. He was the son of the eminent gynaecologist, Alexander Hugh Freeland Barbour and Margaret Nelson Brown.

From 1899 he attended Merchiston Castle School in the south of Edinburgh. In 1906 he left the school to attend Marburg University in Germany for one year.

He received an Honours degree of Master of Arts in classics from the University of Edinburgh in 1910. In 1912 he was accepted to study for a Master of Arts in science from Cambridge University, but his studies were interrupted by the war.

During the First World War he joined the Friends Ambulance Unit at Dunkirk before joining the British Ambulance Unit in Italy but eventually enlisted, probably in 1916.

He graduated from Cambridge in 1918.

In 1919 he travelled to America to attend Columbia University in New York. Here he met Dorothy Dickinson, whom he married in a small ceremony at her summer home, "Kakro", in Westhampton Beach, Long Island on 15 May 1920. She was from a very well-connected Christian family.

Together they then travelled to China (his wife having the intention to act as a Christian missionary) where he then became Professor of Applied Geology at Yenching University (in Peking) from 1920 to 1922. In 1922 and 1923 he was Head of Geology at Peiyang University in Tientsin. Then returning to Yenching as Professor of Geology from 1923 to 1932. During his time in China he served on the staff of the Chinese Geological Survey's Cenozoic Laboratory and was intimately associated with the discovery and dating of Peking Man.

During this period based in China, he communicated with Columbia University, who in 1929 awarded him, in-absentia, a PhD in his field.

In 1932 he left China, as their eldest son Hugh had contracted Peking fever. Return to China then proved impossible due to the ongoing cultural revolution. They settled temporarily in Cincinnati where he took the role of Professor of Geology at Cincinnati University for one year.

In 1934 the Rockefeller Foundation offered him a grant to return to China, but as this did not include visas for his family he declined and instead took up a two-year role lecturing in geology at the University of London, back in Britain.

He returned to Cincinnati in 1937 as associate professor. In 1938 he became Dean of the College of Arts and Sciences, but resigned the position in 1958 to return to teaching geology, a work for which he had great enthusiasm and in which he was distinguished.

In 1960 he retired as emeritus professor of geology and dean emeritus of the College of Arts and Sciences in Cincinnati. After retirement he taught at some other American universities.

Barbour continued to travel the world on important geological expeditions in many parts of the world, notably in China, Mongolia, and Africa.

He spent a number of summers on expeditions in Africa searching for remains of prehistoric man. His work there after 1947 centered on the prehistoric Men-Apes of the Transvaal veldt. For his scientific contributions on four continents, he was honored by the British and the Belgian Royal Geographic Society, Royal Society of South Africa and of Edinburgh, Geological Society of South Africa, and the Italian Institute of Human Paleontology. He was honorary lecturer at the University of London and guest lecturer at the University of Witwatersand, South Africa.

He attended international geological congresses in the United States, Moscow, London, Algiers, and Mexico City, and two Pan-American congresses.

He died peacefully in his sleep, at home in Cincinnati on 11 July 1977, aged 86.

== Bibliography ==
His bibliography consists of over one hundred items, including several books, two monographs, publications in scientific journals, and encyclopaedia articles.

- Recent Observations on the Loess of North China (1935)
- In the Field with Teilhard de Chardin (1965)
- In China When (1975)

== Memberships and affiliations ==
- Royal Society of Edinburgh (1928)
- Assistant Editor to Geological Society of America (1933–4)
- Royal Society of South Africa (1934)
- Royal Geological Society (1937)
- President of the Ohio Academy of Science (1948)
- Geological Society of South Africa (1949)
- Italian Institute of Palaeontology (1955)

== Family ==
The Barbours had three sons (all born in China), Hugh Stewart and John Graham ("Ian") and Robert Freeland.

In later life he lived at 340 Thrall Street in Cincinnati, USA.
