= Alexander Russell Simpson =

Scottish physician

Sir Alexander Russell Simpson FRCPE FRSE
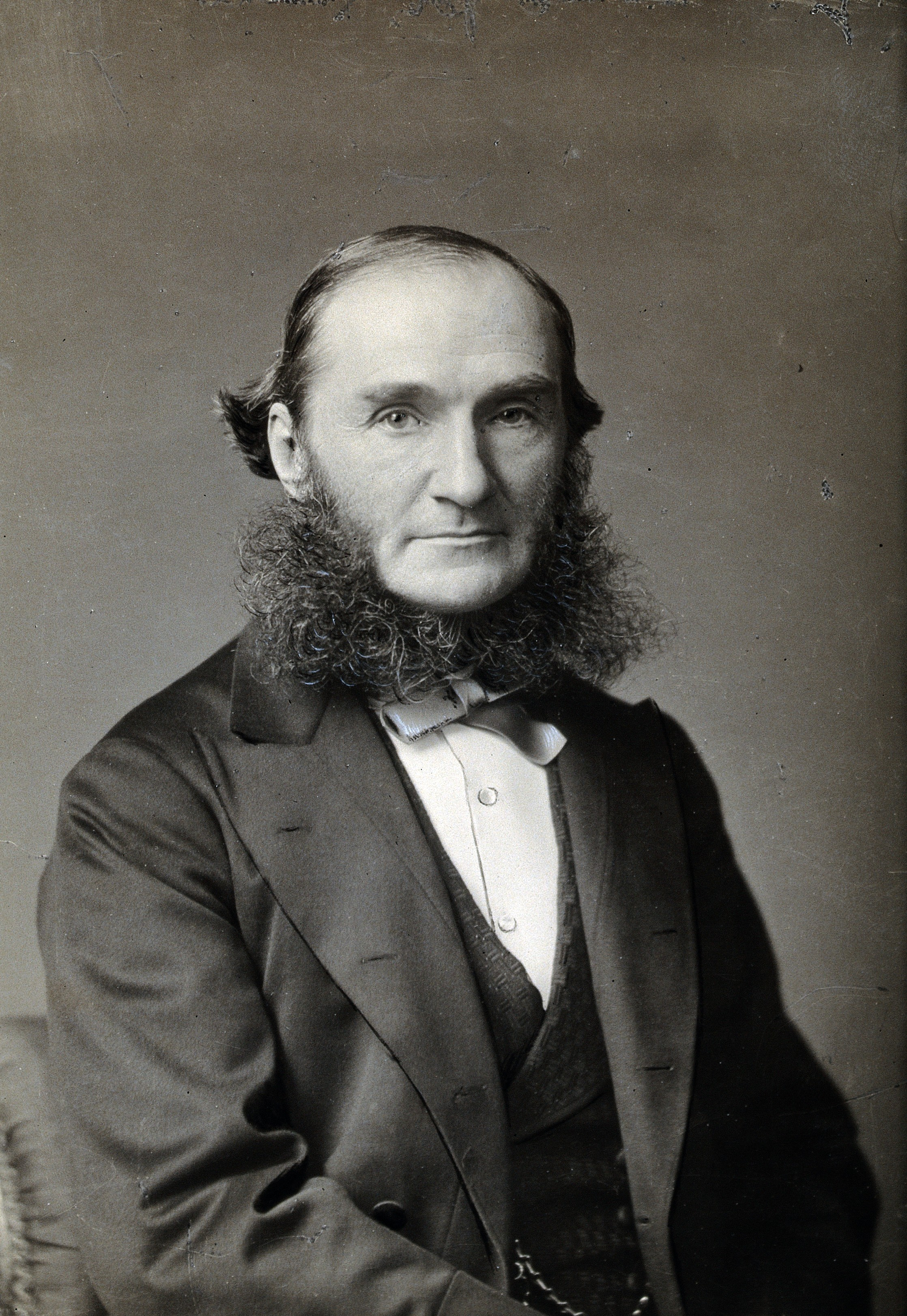
- Born: 30 April 1835; Bathgate, Scotland
- Died: 6 April 1916 (aged 80)
- Resting place: Grange Cemetery, Edinburgh; 55.935228°N 3.187578°W
- Education: University of Edinburgh
- Known for: inventor of obstetrical forceps
- Spouse: Margaret Stewart Barbour
- Scientific career
- Fields: obstetrics
- Workplaces: University of Edinburgh, Royal Society of Edinburgh

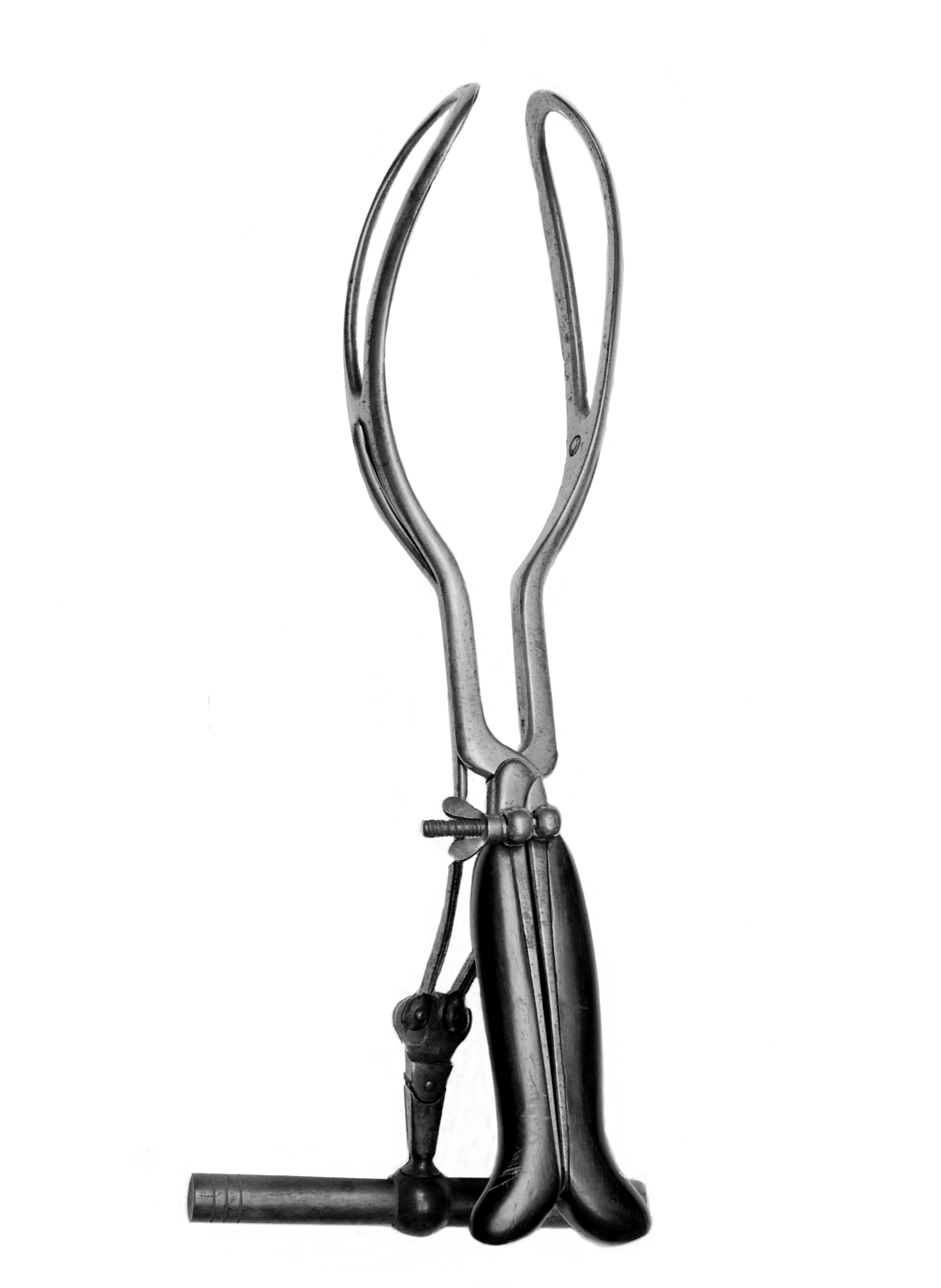
Axis Traction or Obstetrics Forceps

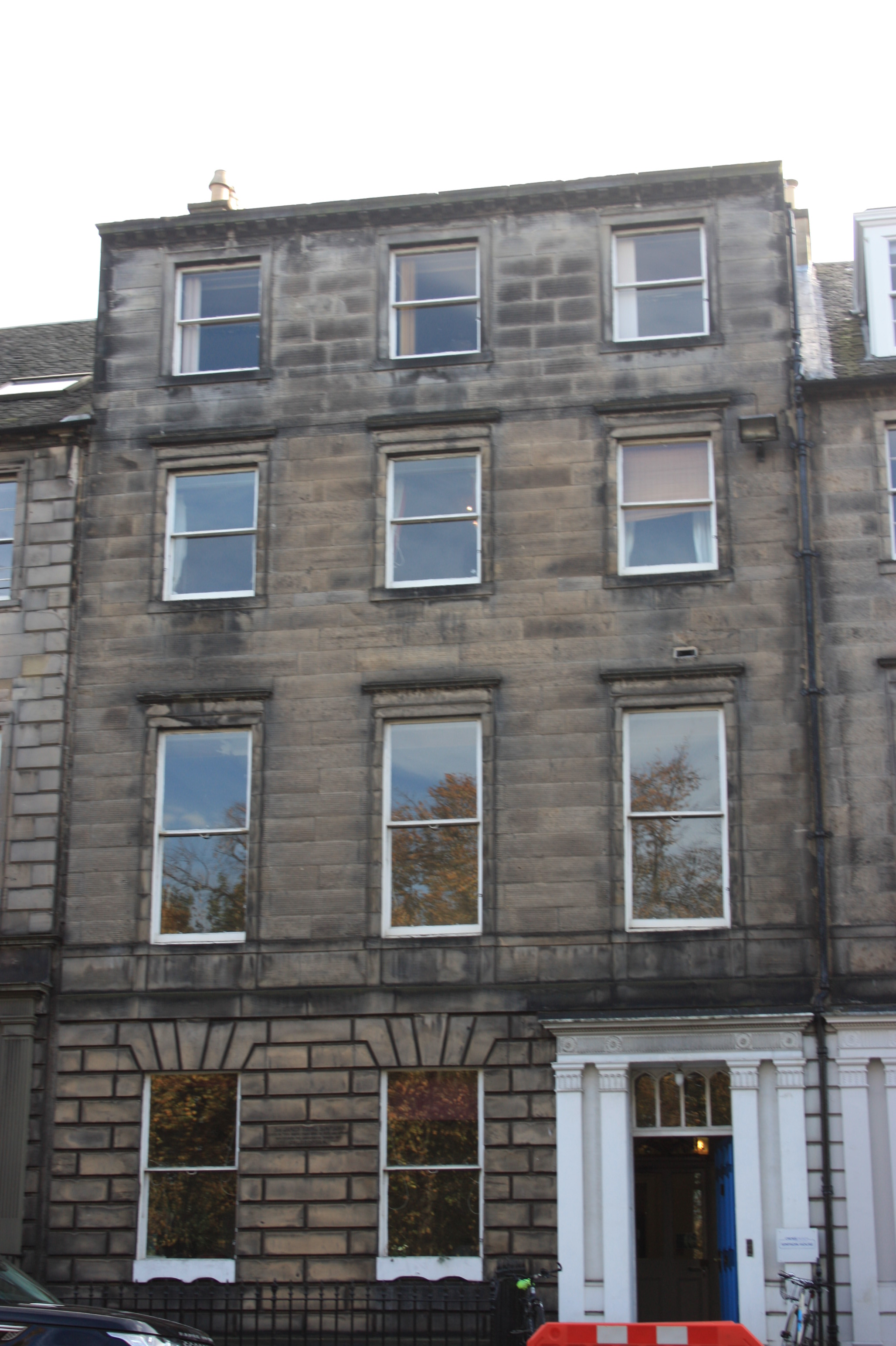
52 Queen Street, Edinburgh

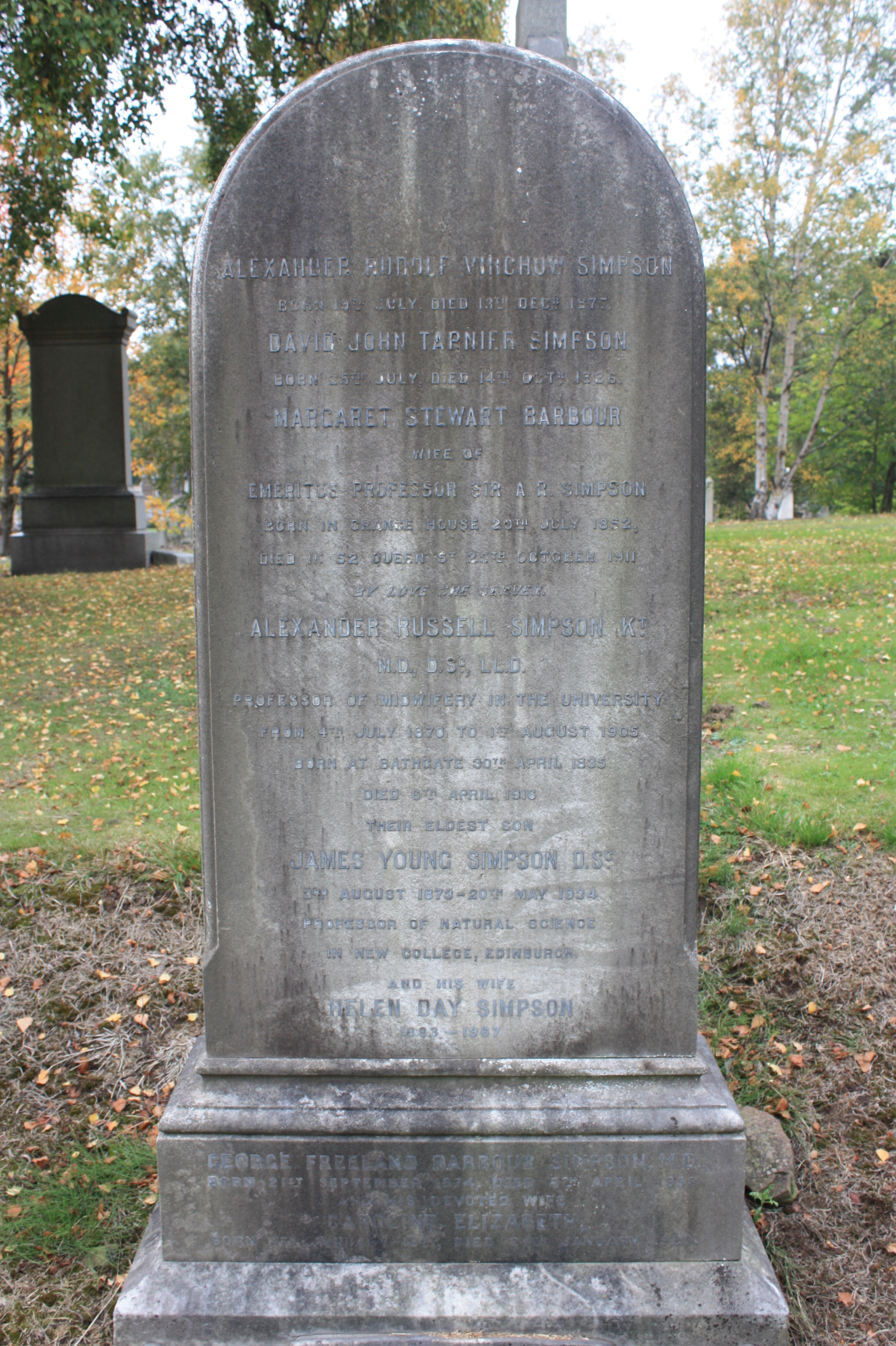
The grave of Alexander Russell Simpson, Grange Cemetery, Edinburgh

Sir Alexander Russell Simpson FRCPE FRSE LLD (20 April 1835 – 6 April 1916) was a Scottish physician and Professor of Midwifery at the University of Edinburgh. He invented the axis-traction forceps also known as obstetrics forceps which assisted in childbirth and reducing pain.

== Life ==
Simpson was born in Bathgate on 30 April 1835, the son of Alexander Simpson (1797–1877), and nephew of James Young Simpson. He was educated locally then studied medicine primarily at the University of Edinburgh but also at Montpellier, Berlin and Vienna, graduating with an MD in 1856 with the thesis "On the anatomy of the umbilical cord" .

From 1865 to 1870 he operated a doctor's surgery in Glasgow at 1 Blythswood Square. In 1870, on the death of his uncle, Professor James Young Simpson, he inherited his uncle's large townhouse at 52 Queen Street in Edinburgh and returned to that city, also taking over his uncle's position at the University of Edinburgh as Professor of Midwifery.

In 1871 he was elected a Fellow of the Royal Society of Edinburgh his proposer being John Hutton Balfour. He was President of the Medico-Chirurgical Society in 1889, President of the Royal College of Physicians of Edinburgh from 1891 to 1893 and President of the Harveian Society of Edinburgh 1911.

General Election Jan 1910: Edinburgh & St Andrews Universities
Party	Candidate	Votes	%	±%
Liberal Unionist	Robert Finlay	5,205	65.9	−2.0
Liberal	Alexander Russell Simpson	2,693	34.1	N/A
Majority		2,512	31.8	−4.0
Turnout		7,898	69.8	+5.1
Registered electors		11,319		
Liberal Unionist hold		Swing	N/A	

He was a member of the United Free Church of Scotland and helped to run the Carrubbers Close Mission. He was a strong supporter of the Temperance Movement.

He retired in 1905 and was knighted in 1906.

He died in a road accident on 6 April 1916, and was buriedon 10 April in Grange Cemetery in the south of Edinburgh. The grave lies in the main south-west section.

== Publications ==
- On the Head Flexion in Labour (1879)
- Contributions to Obstetrics and Gynaecology (1880)
- Obstetrics in the Encyclopædia Britannica Eleventh Edition (1911)

== Family ==
In 1872 he married Margaret Stewart Barbour (died 1911), sister of Professor Alexander Hugh Freeland Barbour. She was an author and wrote Awakings or Butterfly Chrysalids in 1892.

Their children included James Young Simpson and George Freeland Barbour Simpson (1875–1958).

He was grandfather to the geographer Alexander Rudolph Barbour Simpson FRSE (died 1977) and the first women professional archaeologist in Scotland, Margaret E. B. Simpson (1906–1994).

He was paternal uncle to Thomas Blantyre Simpson FRSE QC.

== Artistic recognition ==
His sketch portrait of 1884, by William Brassey Hole, is held by the Scottish National Portrait Gallery.

Academic offices
Preceded by James Young Simpson	Professor of Midwifery, Edinburgh; 1870-1905	Succeeded by John Halliday Croom
