= James Young Simpson =

Scottish obstetrician (1811–1870)

Sir James Young Simpson Bt FRCPE FSA Scot
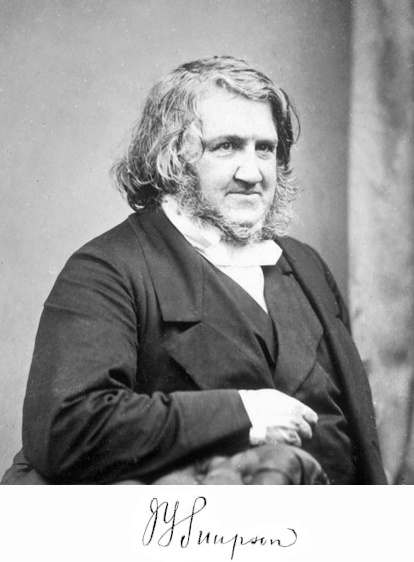
- James Simpson
- Born: 7 June 1811; Bathgate, West Lothian, Scotland
- Died: 6 May 1870 (aged 58); Edinburgh, Scotland
- Education: University of Edinburgh
- Known for: Use of chloroform as anaesthetic in childbirth, design of obstetric forceps
- Spouse: Janet Grindlay (m. 1839)
- Children: Margaret Grindlay Simpson; Sir Walter Grindlay Simpson, 2nd Baronet; Eve Blantyre Simpson; And 6 others

Notes
- James Young Simpson (great nephew)

Sir James Young Simpson, 1st Baronet FRSE FRCPE FSA Scot (7 June 1811 – 6 May 1870) was a Scottish obstetrician and a significant figure in the history of medicine. He was the first physician to demonstrate the anaesthetic properties of chloroform in humans and helped to popularize its use in medicine.

Simpson's intellectual interests ranged from archaeology to an almost taboo subject at the time: hermaphroditism. He was an early advocate of the use of midwives in the hospital environment. Many prominent women also consulted him for their gynaecological problems. Simpson wrote Homœopathy, its Tenets and Tendencies, refuting the ideas put forward by Hahnemann.

His services as an early founder of gynaecology and proponent of hospital reform were rewarded with a knighthood, and by 1847 he had been appointed as physician to the Queen in Scotland. Queen Victoria also used anaesthesia for her childbirth, resulting in a significant increase of popularity in anaesthesia.

Simpson was a close friend of Sir David Brewster, and was present at his deathbed. His contribution to the understanding of the anaesthetic properties of chloroform had a major impact on surgery.

== Education and early career ==
James Simpson was born in Bathgate, a younger son of Mary Jervais and David Simpson, a baker. He attended the local school, and in 1825, at the age of 14, entered the University of Edinburgh to study for an arts degree. Two years later he began his medical studies at the university, graduating with an MBChB. He became a licentiate of the Royal College of Surgeons of Edinburgh in 1830 and received his MD in 1832. While at University he took additional classes including those delivered by the surgeon Robert Liston. As a result of the quality of his MD thesis on inflammation, Professor of Pathology John Thomson took him on as his assistant.

As a student he became a member and then Senior President of the Royal Medical Society, initiating a lifelong interest in the Society's advancement. His first role was as a general practitioner in the Stockbridge district based at 2 Deanhaugh Street, and at the age of 28, he succeeded James Hamilton as Professor of Medicine and Midwifery at the University of Edinburgh.

== Obstetric anaesthesia ==
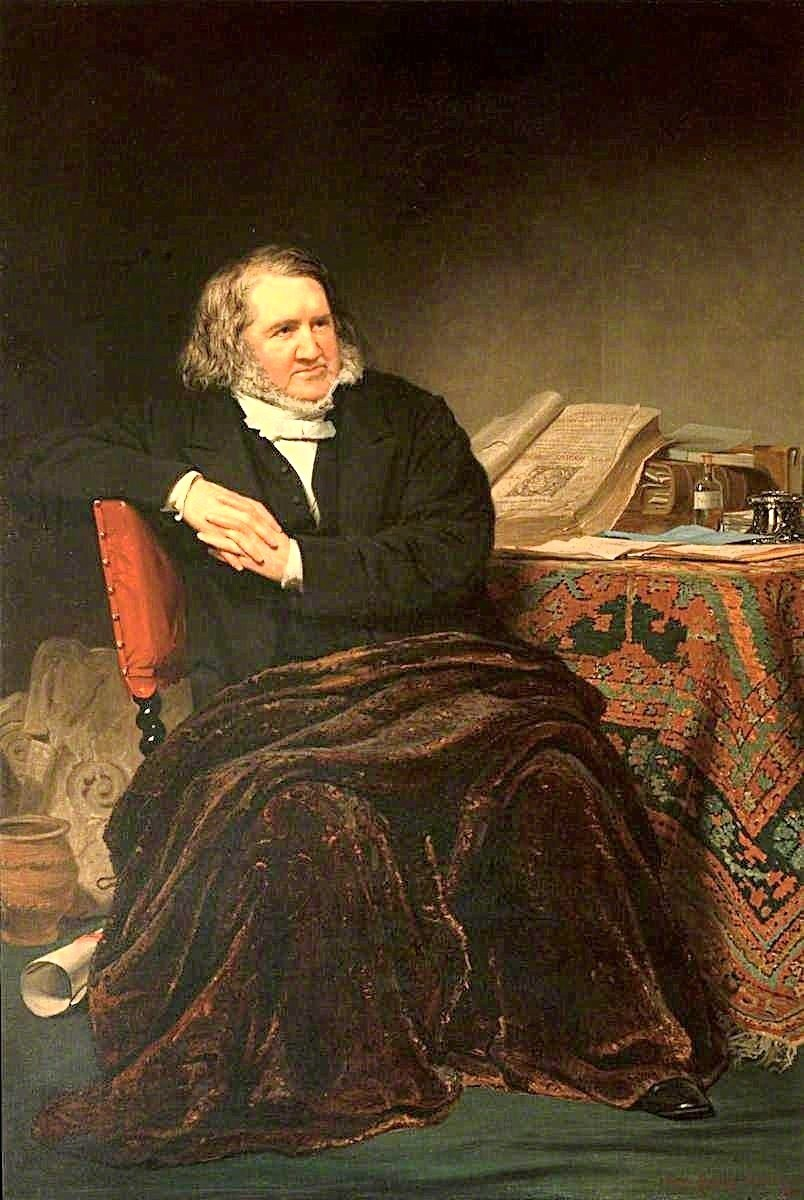
Norman Macbeth - Sir James Young Simpson. Royal College of Physicians of Edinburgh collection

Sir Humphry Davy used the first anaesthetic in 1799: nitrous oxide (laughing gas). William T. G. Morton's demonstration of ether as an anaesthetic in 1846 was initially dismissed because it irritated the lungs of the patients. Chloroform had been synthesised in 1831, but its uses had not been greatly investigated. Dr Robert Mortimer Glover had first described the anaesthetic properties of chloroform upon animals in 1842 in a thesis which won the Harveian Society's Gold Medal that year, but had not thought to use it on humans (fearing its safety).

Simpson's most significant contribution to medicine was the introduction of anaesthesia to childbirth; In 1834 he first demonstrated the properties of chloroform upon humans, during an experiment with friends in which he confirmed that it could be used to put one to sleep. Dr Simpson and two of his assistants, Dr George Skene Keith (1819–1910) and James Matthews Duncan (1826–1890), used to sit every evening in Dr Simpson's dining room to try new chemicals to see if they had any anaesthetic effect. Following a visit to Linlithgow, where Simpson was recommended to trial a sample of chloroform from a local pharmacist, David Waldie, Simpson then returned to Edinburgh. On 4 November 1847, Simpson and his friends decided to try chloroform themselves, which Simpson had obtained from local pharmacist William Flockhart of Duncan and Flockhart of North Bridge, Edinburgh. On inhaling the chemical they found that a general mood of cheer and humour had set in, but suddenly all of them collapsed only to regain consciousness the next morning. Simpson knew, as soon as he woke up, that he had found something that could be used as an anaesthetic. They soon had Miss Agnes Petrie, Simpson's niece, try it. She fell asleep soon after inhaling it while singing the words, "I am an angel!". There is a prevalent myth that the mother of the first child delivered under chloroform christened her child "Anaesthesia"; the story is retailed in Simpson's biography as written by his daughter Eve. However, the son of the first baby delivered by chloroform explained that Simpson's parturient had been one Jane Carstairs, and her child was baptised Wilhelmina. "Anaesthesia" was a nickname Simpson had given the baby.

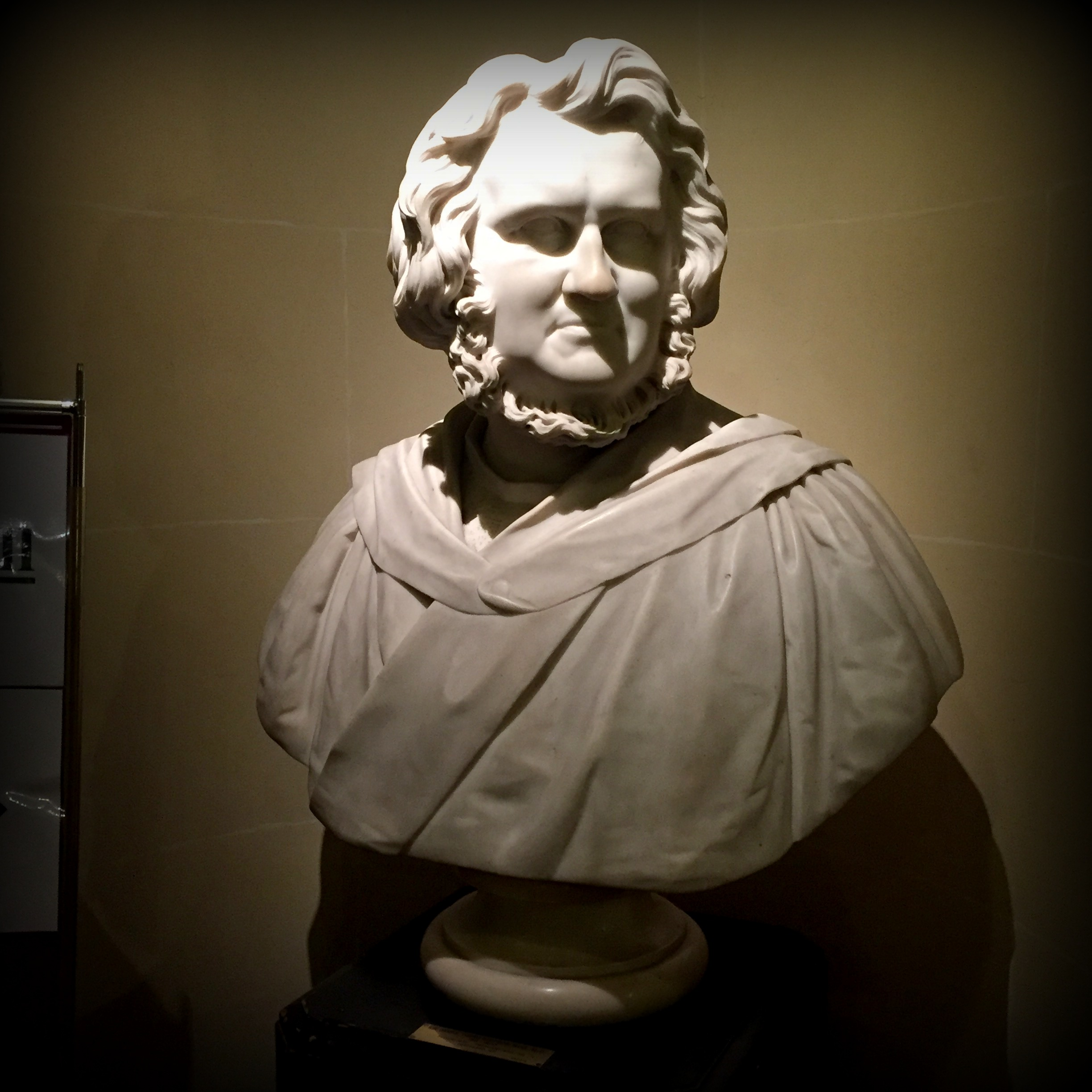
Bust of Sir James Y. Simpson at the Royal College of Physicians of Edinburgh, Scotland

It was much by chance that Simpson survived the chloroform dosage he administered to himself. If he had inhaled too much and died, chloroform would have been seen as a dangerous substance, which in fact it is. Conversely, if Simpson had inhaled slightly less it would not have put him to sleep. It was his willingness to explore the possibilities of the substance that set him on the road to a career as a pioneer in the field of medicine. Subsequently, organising supplies to Florence Nightingale and Queen Victoria, led to its use in obstetrics and for the military, and according to the British Medical Journal changed the face of medicine for a century.

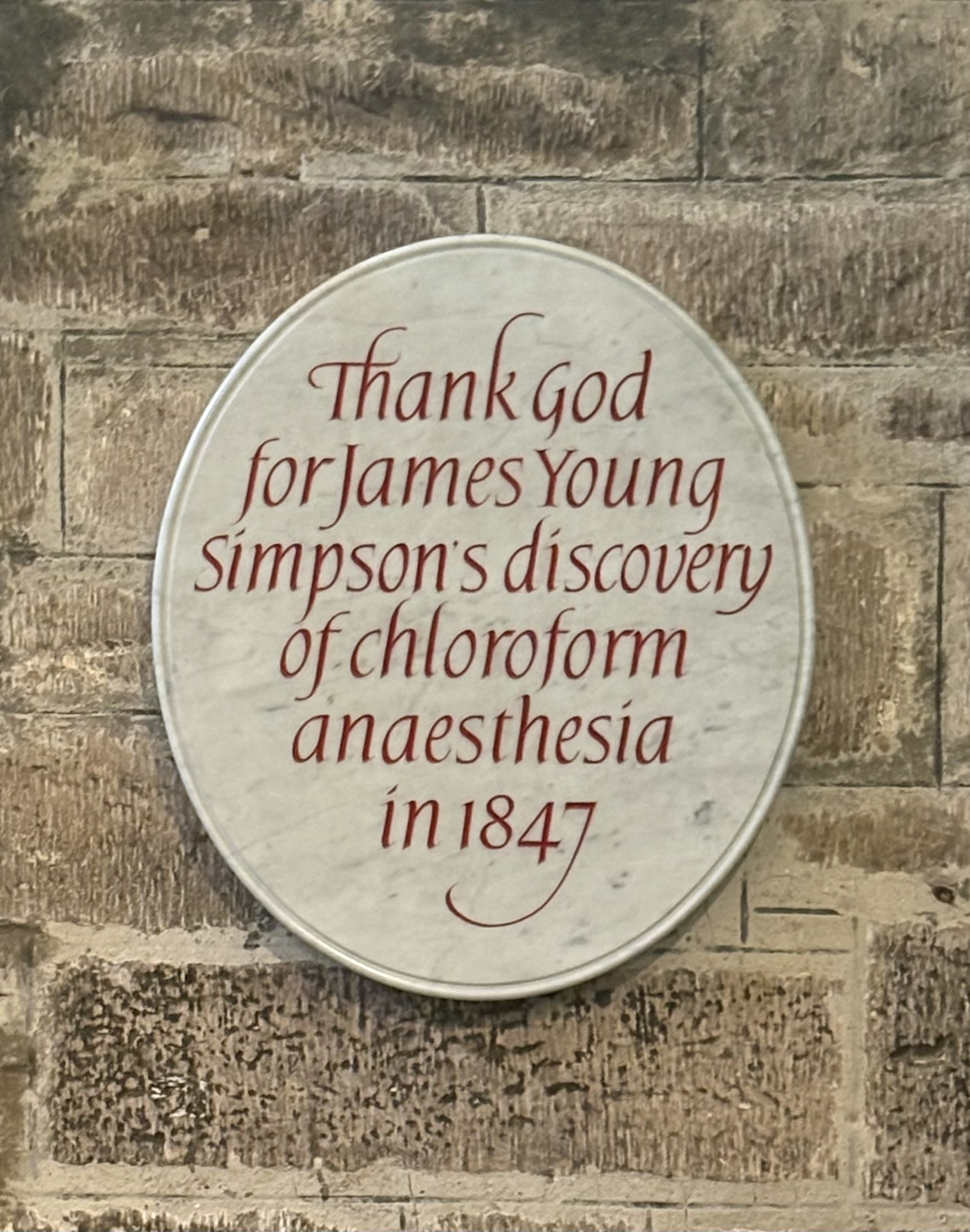
Signage posted inside St. Gile’s Cathedral in Edinburgh, Scotland, honoring the groundbreaking work of James Young Simpson.

An account of some of Simpson's early uses of ether in childbirth are related by Manchester-based doctor Edmund Lund who visited him in 1847 and can be found in a manuscript held by special collections at the University of Manchester with the reference MMM/12/2.

== Other medical contributions ==
Simpson improved the design of obstetric forceps, and to this day they are known in obstetric circles as "Simpson's Forceps", as well as designing the Air Tractor in 1838. The Air Tractor was the earliest known vacuum extractor to assist childbirth; however, the method did not become popular until the invention of the ventouse over a century later.

In 1859 Simpson described coccydynia (coccyx pain) and its treatment by coccygotomy (severing the tendons and ligaments attached to the coccyx) or coccygectomy (surgical removal of the coccyx). Coccydynia was described in The American Journal of the Medical Sciences as "…the disease made celebrated by the recent admirable researches of Dr Simpson of Edinburgh".

== Antiquarian research ==
Simpson joined the Society of Antiquaries of Scotland in 1849, and became its vice-president in 1860. He made contributions to both the history of medicine and to archaeology. He published several papers on leprosy and syphilis. In both cases he was concerned with the symptoms of the diseases and the relation between historical reports and contemporary cases, and also with the institutions that were set up to care for and segregate the patients. Another area he worked on was medicine in Roman Britain.

Simpson published an early and important work on prehistoric rock art Archaic Sculpturings of Cups, Circles, &c. Upon Stones and Rocks in Scotland, England, & Other Countries. Simpson listed and categorized examples of sculpturings from many parts of the British Isles, often from personal examination, and also included examples from other countries for comparison. Many illustrations are provided. After Simpson's death, a collection of his antiquarian essays was published in two volumes.

His great-grand-niece, Margaret E. B. Simpson, would later become the first women professional archaeologist in Scotland. It is speculated that his interest in Antiquarian research may have influenced her in regards to her career.

== Personal life ==
Simpson was a devout adherent of the Free Church of Scotland, but he refused to sign the Westminster Confession of Faith, because of what he believed to be its literal interpretation of the book of Genesis.

Simpson's principal residence was Strathavon Lodge, but he also kept a town house at 52 Queen Street, Edinburgh, and a country house near Bathgate. The family seat was Strathavon, Linlithgow.

== Marriage and Grindlay family ==
The Simpson and Grindlay families of Edinburgh were closely interrelated, forming a single extended family.

In 1839, Simpson married Janet Grindlay (later Lady Janet Grindlay Simpson), daughter of the Edinburgh and Liverpool shipping grandee Walter Grindlay, a member of the Scottish branch of the landed gentry Grindlay family. Simpson and Walter were cousins, sharing grandparents in Alexander Simpson and his wife Isabella Grindlay, and Walter's daughter Janet or 'Jessie', was Simpson's first cousin once removed. Simpson's son, Walter Grindlay Simpson, 2nd Baronet was Walter Grindlay's nephew and godson.

Simpson relied on Walter Grindlay and his estate for financial support a number of times during his career.

== Death and memorials ==
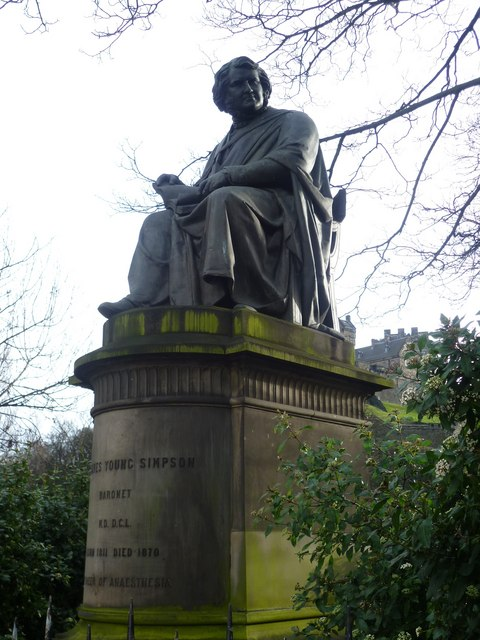
Sir James Young Simpson statue, West Princes Street Gardens, Edinburgh

In 1840 Simpson was elected a member of the Harveian Society of Edinburgh and served as president in 1848. He was elected President of the Royal College of Physicians of Edinburgh in 1850 and an international member of the American Philosophical Society in 1863. In 1850 he was also elected a member of the Aesculapian Club. He was created a Baronet of Strathavon in the County of Linlithgow, and of the City of Edinburgh, in 1866. He died at his home in Edinburgh in May 1870 at the age of 58. A burial spot in Westminster Abbey was offered to his family, but they declined and instead buried him closer to home in Warriston Cemetery, Edinburgh. However, a memorial bust of Simpson can be found in a niche at Westminster Abbey in London. On the day of Simpson's funeral, a Scottish holiday was declared, including the banks and stock markets, with over 100,000 citizens lining the funeral cortege on its way to the cemetery, while over 1,700 colleagues and business leaders took part in the procession itself. A year later, chloroform supplier, William Flockhart was buried nearby.

Dr Alexander Russell Simpson, his nephew, inherited his town house at 52 Queen Street and lived there until his death in 1916, when it was then bequeathed to the Church of Scotland. Since then the building has been through many uses including being requisitioned by the army during the Second World War and being used as a centre for training Sunday School teachers in the 1950s. Today, the town house is the premises of a charity called Simpson House, which provides a counselling service for adults and children affected by alcohol and drug use. There is a plaque on the wall outside to mark the house as having been the home of James Young Simpson from 1845 to 1870.

In 1879 the Edinburgh Royal Maternity and Simpson Memorial Hospital and in 1939 the Simpson Memorial Maternity Pavilion were named in his honour, as is the current Simpson Centre for Reproductive Health at the Royal Infirmary of Edinburgh. The Quartermile development, which consists of the Old Royal Infirmary in Edinburgh, named its main residential street Simpson Loan in his honour.

== Coat of arms ==
The coat of arms of the Simpson Baronets, award to James Young Simpson on 3 February 1866, are influenced by his work in medicine and anaesthesia.

Coat of arms of Simpson of Strathavon and Edinburgh
Crest A staff erect encircled by a serpent or. Escutcheon Or, on a chief vert a goshawk between two crescents argent. Motto "Victo Dolore" (pain conquered or victory over pain)

== In popular culture ==
Ambrose Parry's historical novels of the Raven, Fisher, and Simpson series (2018–) feature Simpson as a key protagonist.

== Gallery ==
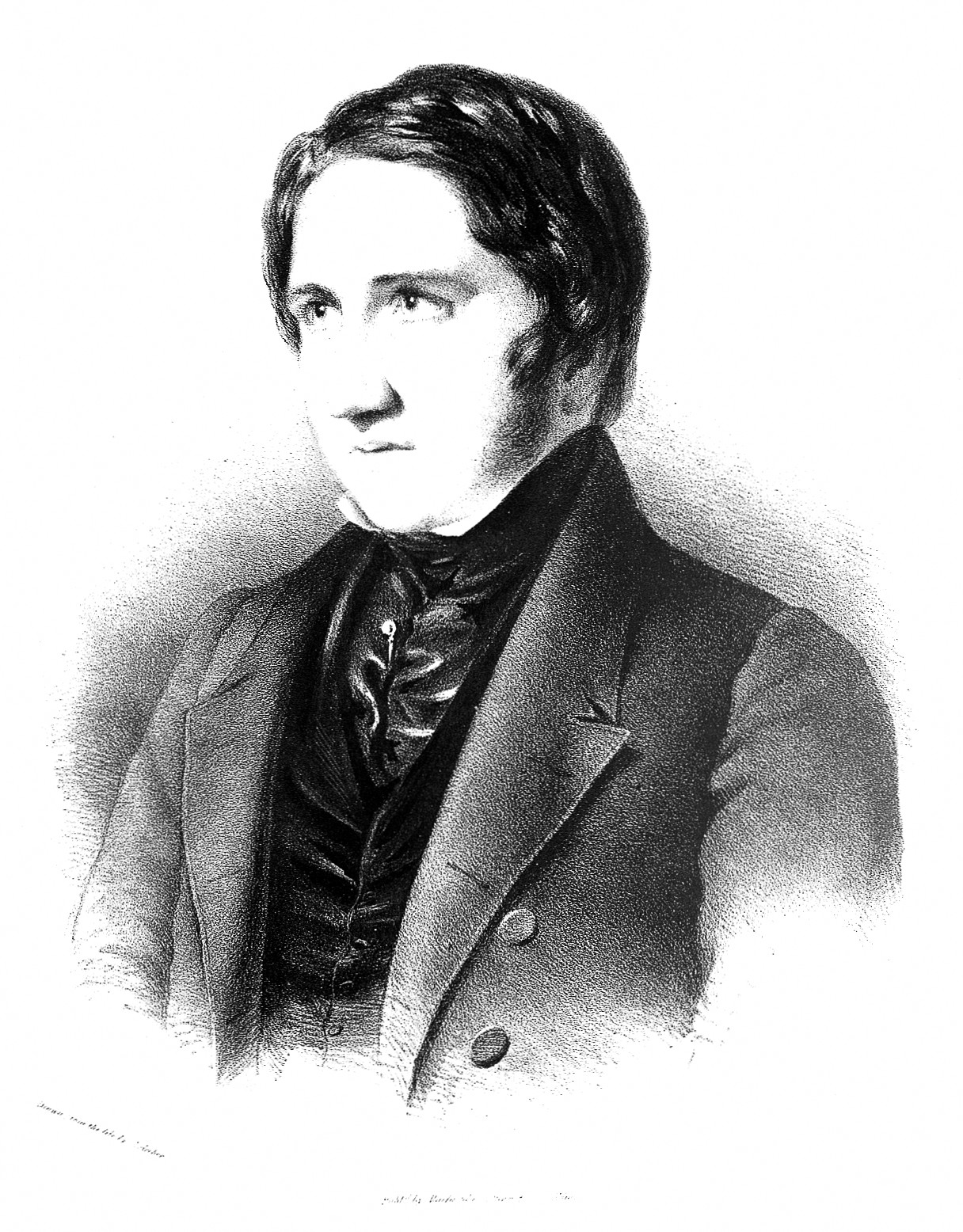
Sir James by James Archer (c.1848)

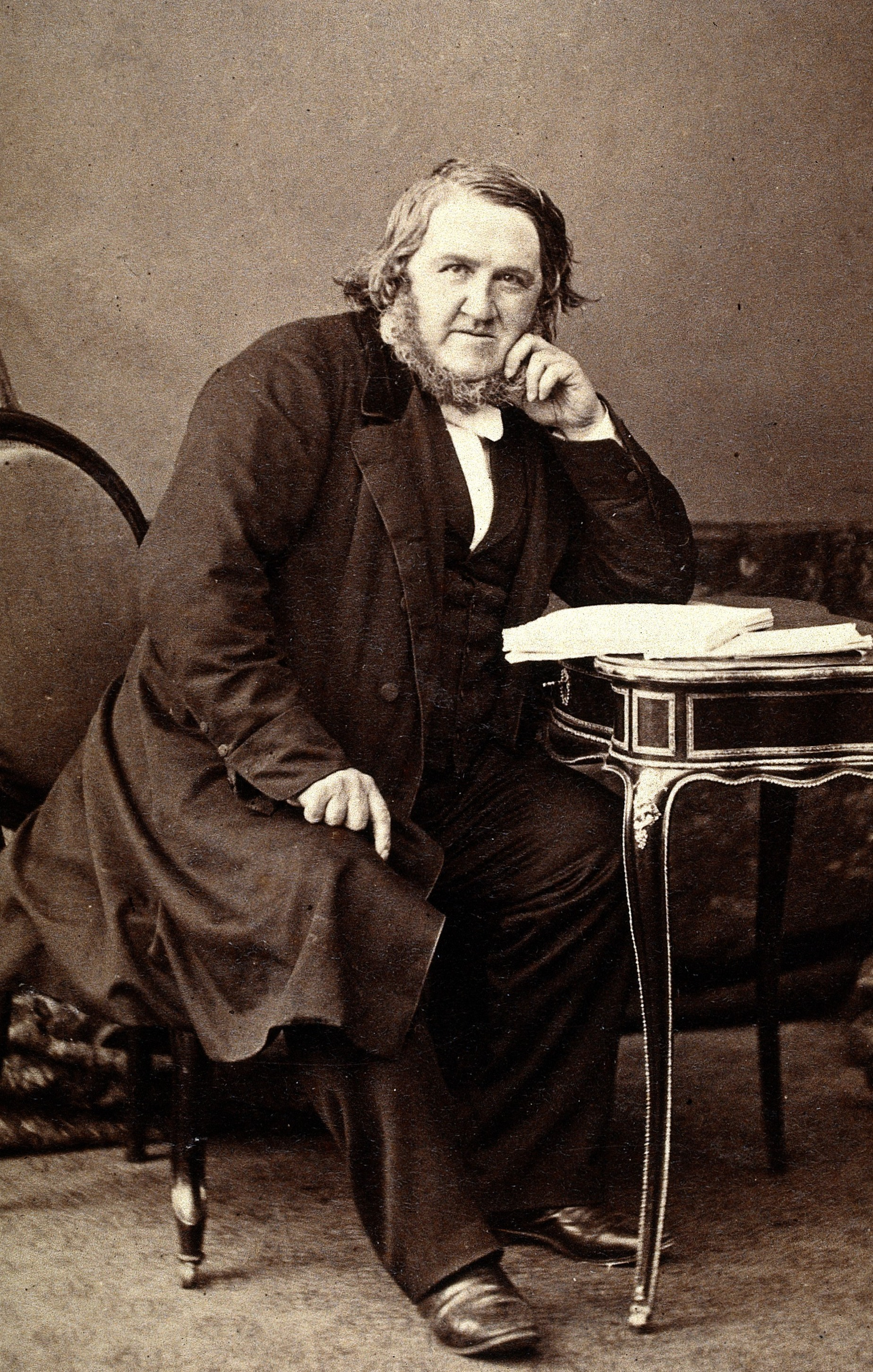
Sir James Young Simpson

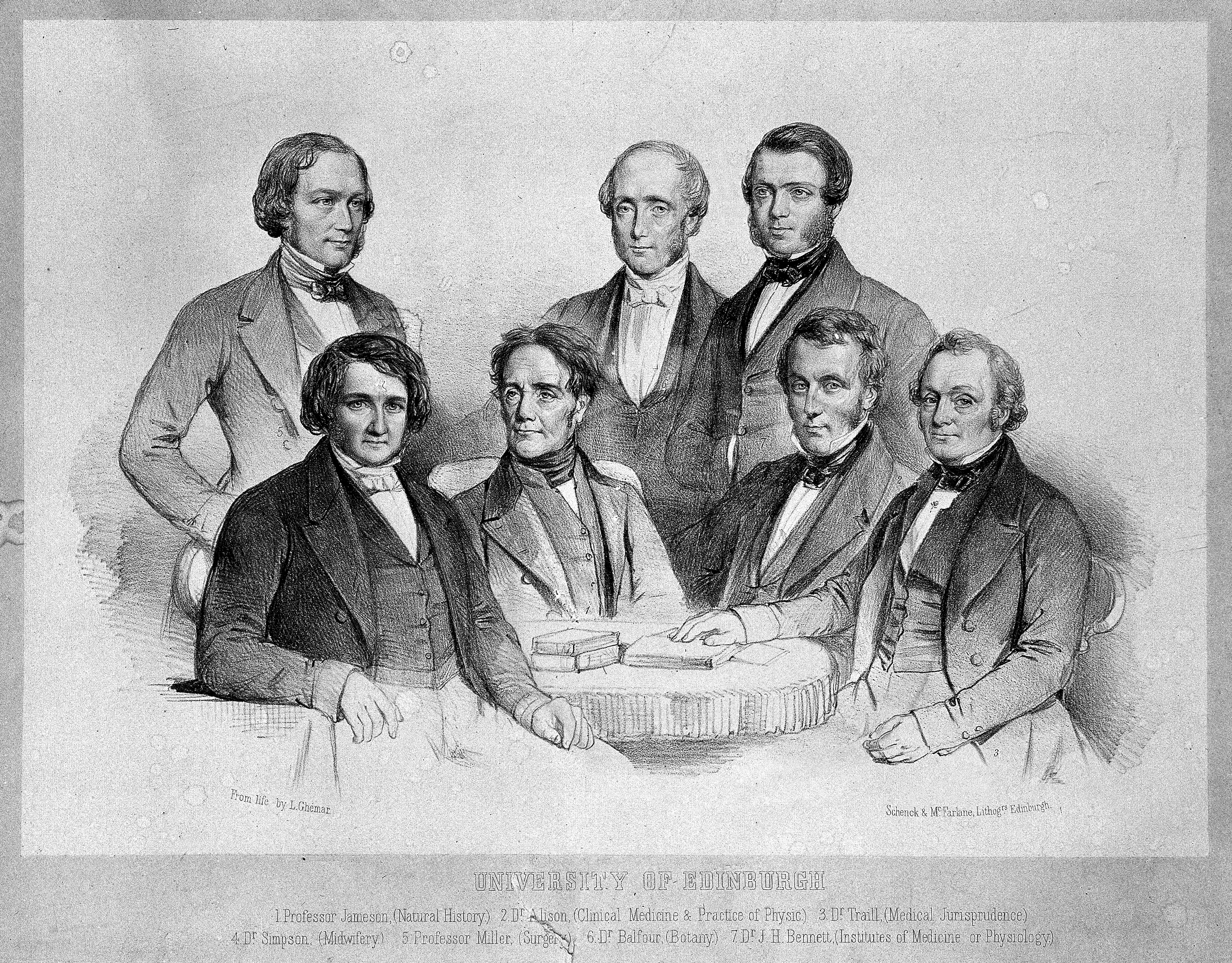
Sir James alongside Professor Robert Jameson, Dr William Alison, Dr Thomas Traill, Professor James Miller, Sir Isaac Balfour, Dr John Bennett, of the University of Edinburgh.

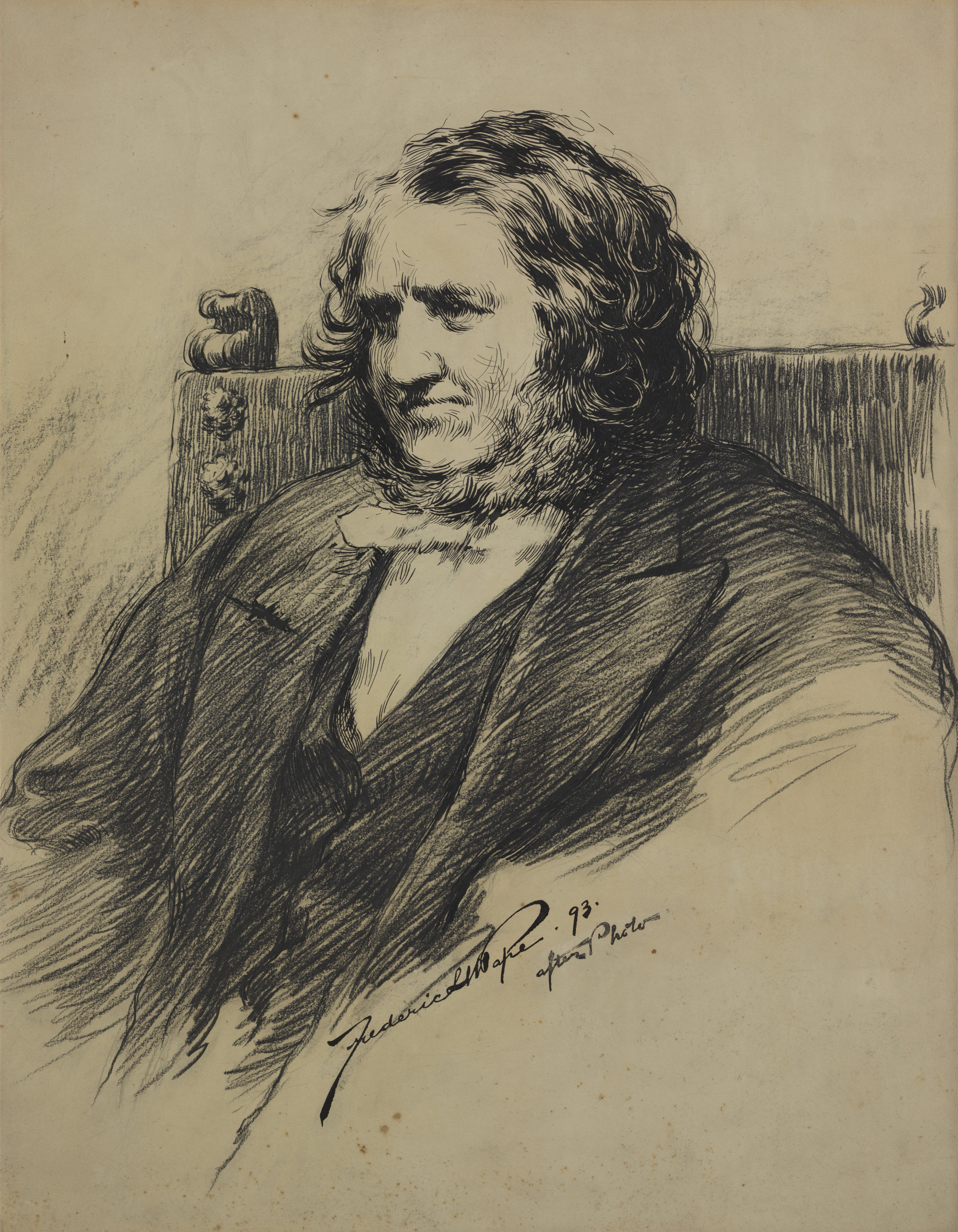
Sir James Y Simpson

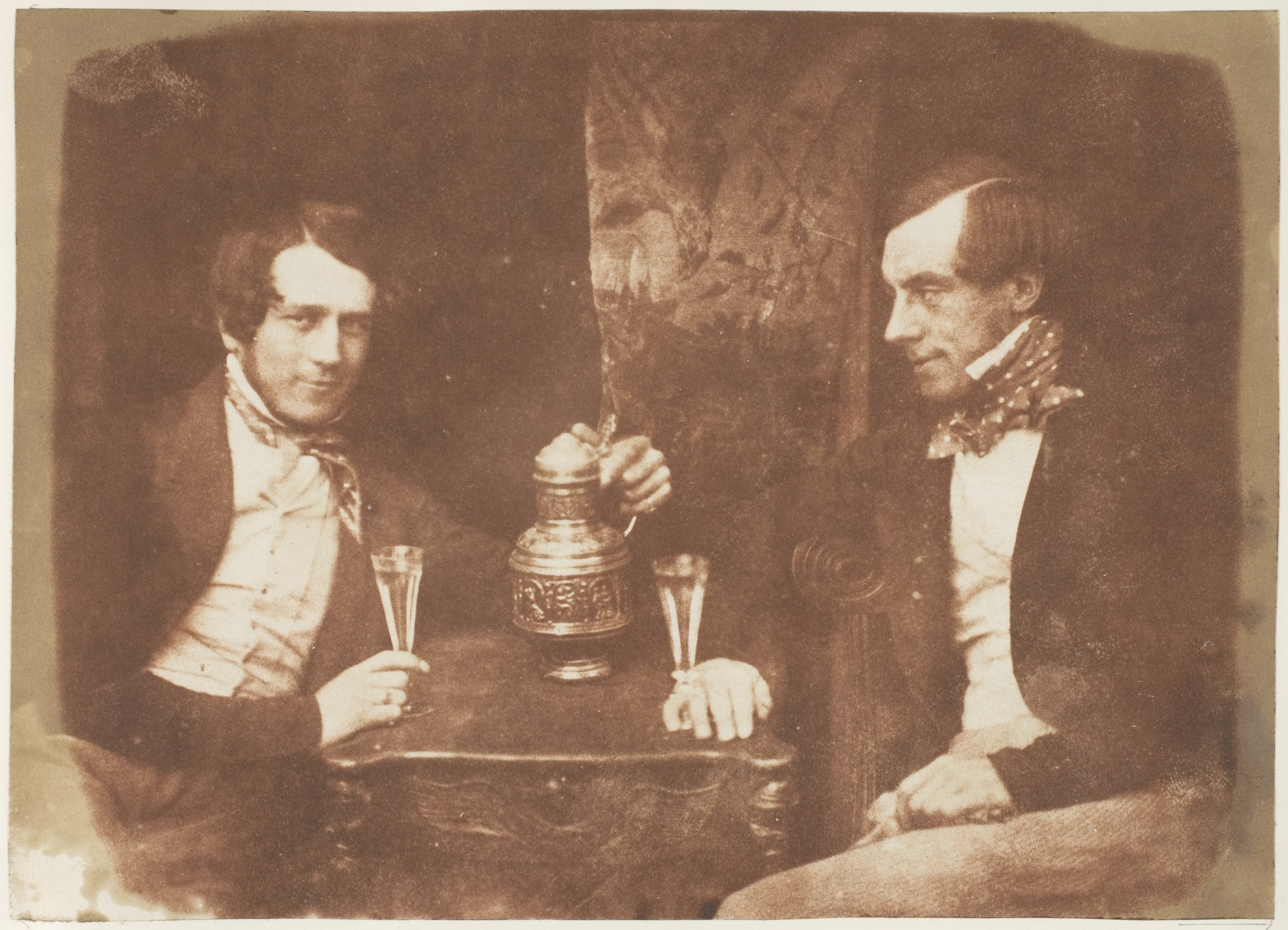
Sir James Young Simpson and Wainhouse (or Muirhouse)

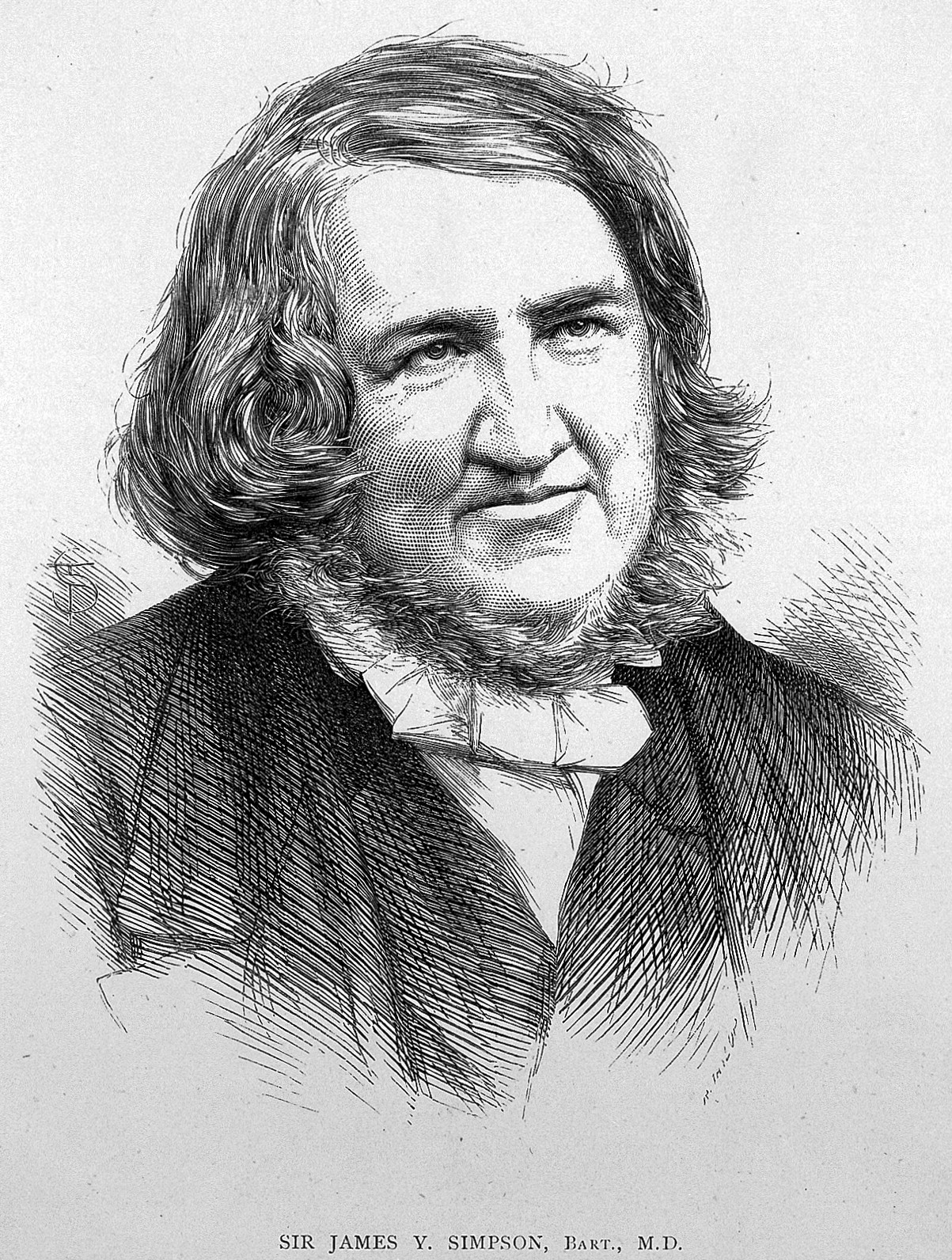
Sir James Y Simpson, Bart, M.D.

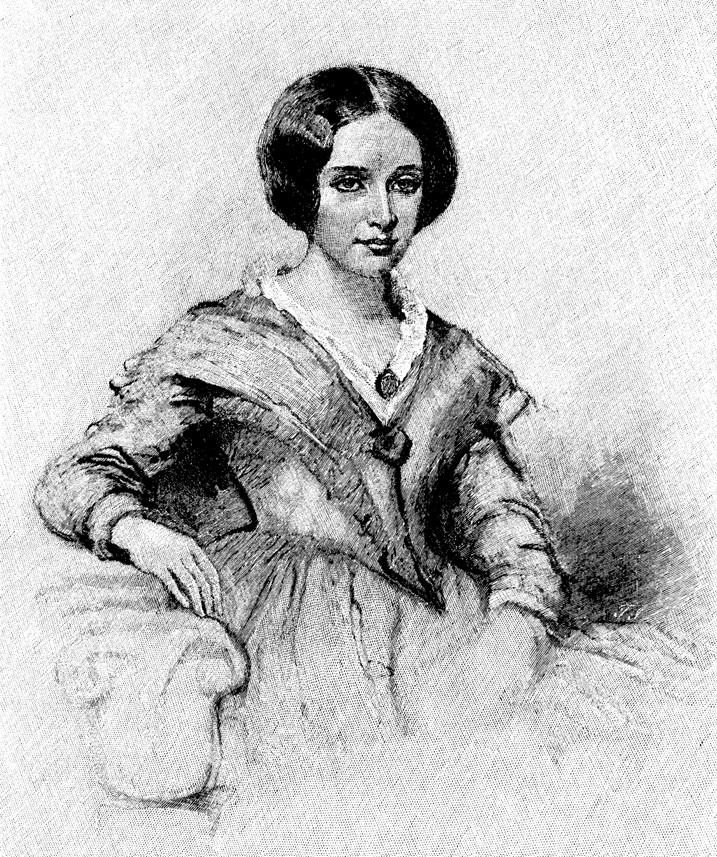
Lady Janet 'Jessie' Grindlay Simpson, a spectator of the first trial of chloroform by James Archer (c. 1846)

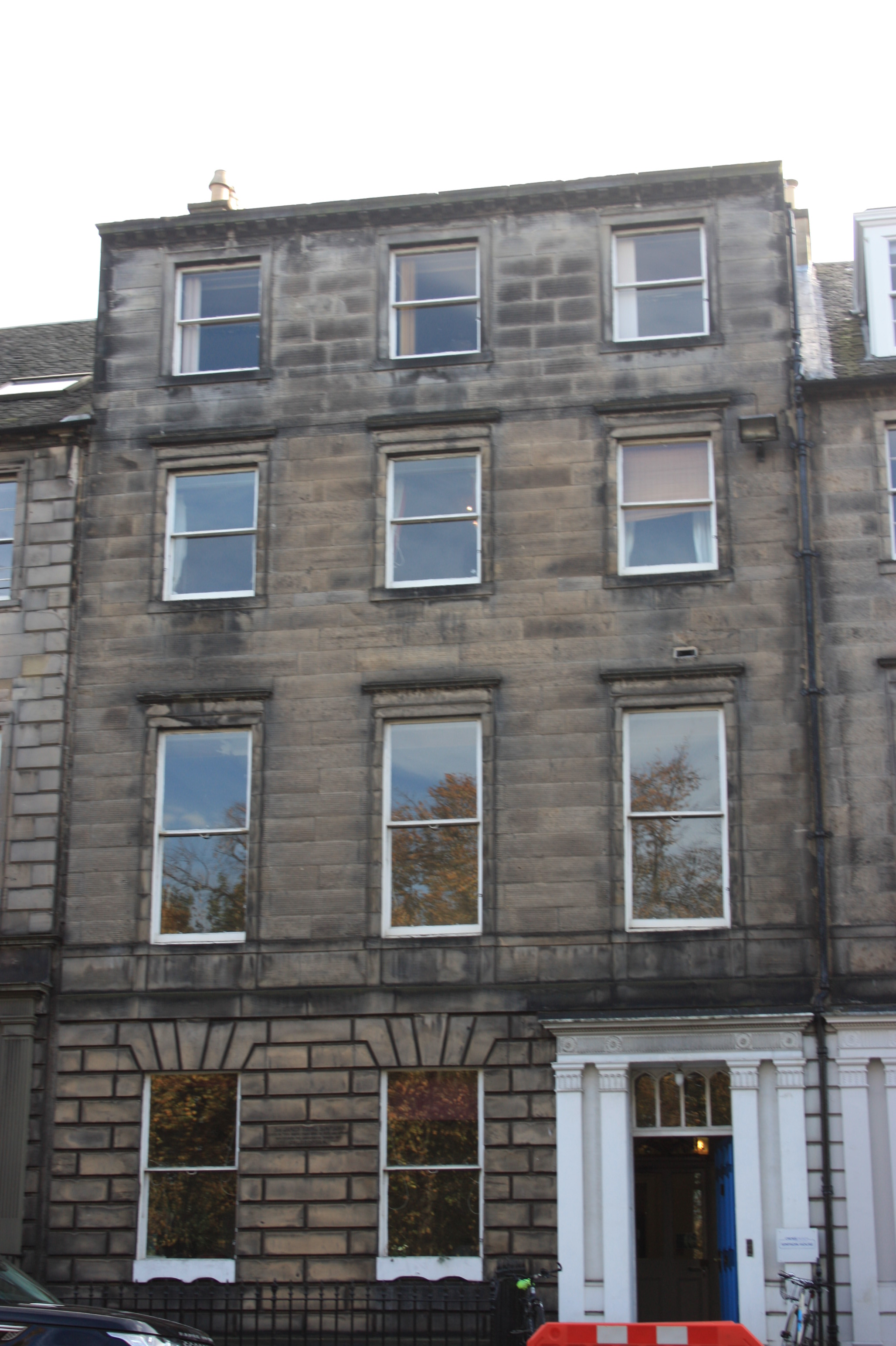
52 Queen Street, Edinburgh. The townhouse of Sir James Young Simpson

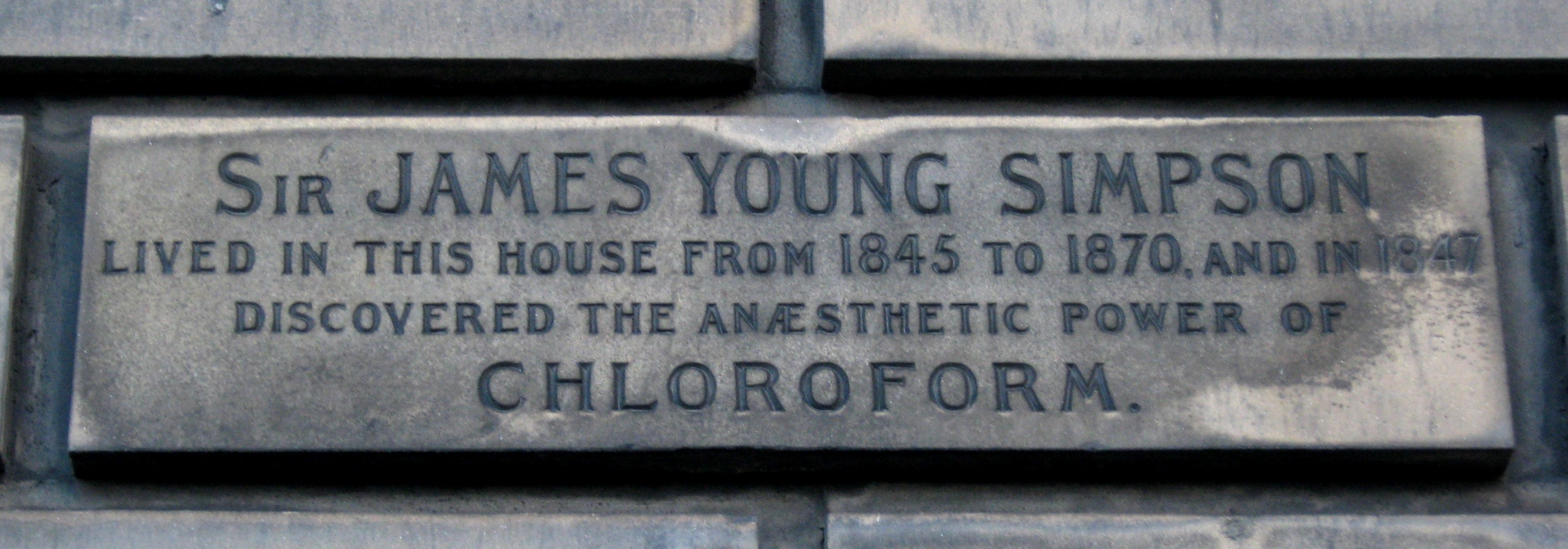
Plate outside the former home of Sir James in Edinburgh

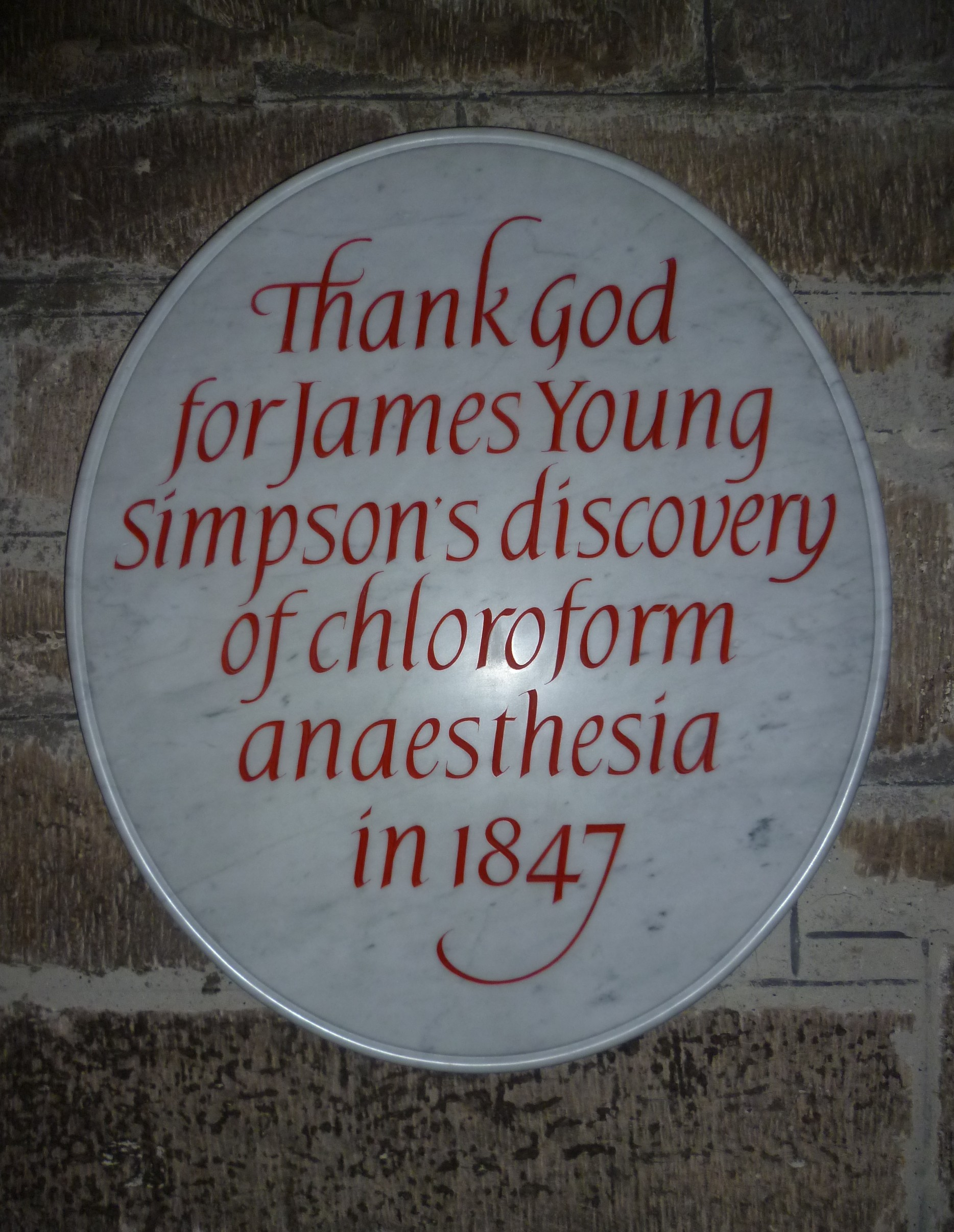
Memorial plaque in St. Giles, Edinburgh

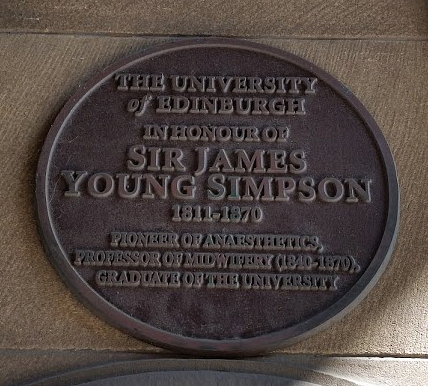
Sir James Young Simpson plague at the University of Edinburgh Medical School.

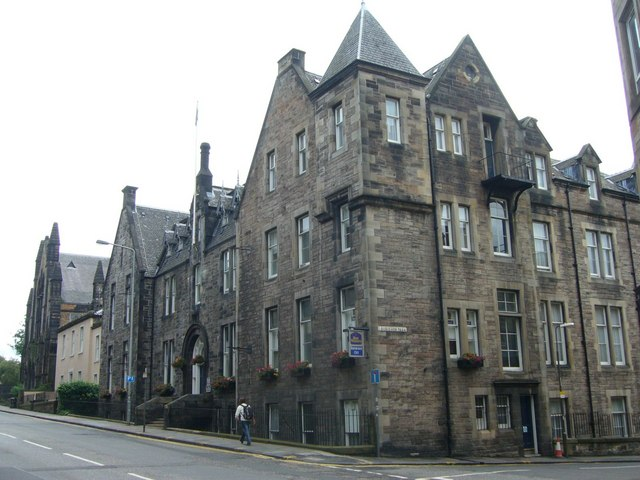
The Simpson Memorial Maternity Hospital built to commemorate Sir James in 1879.

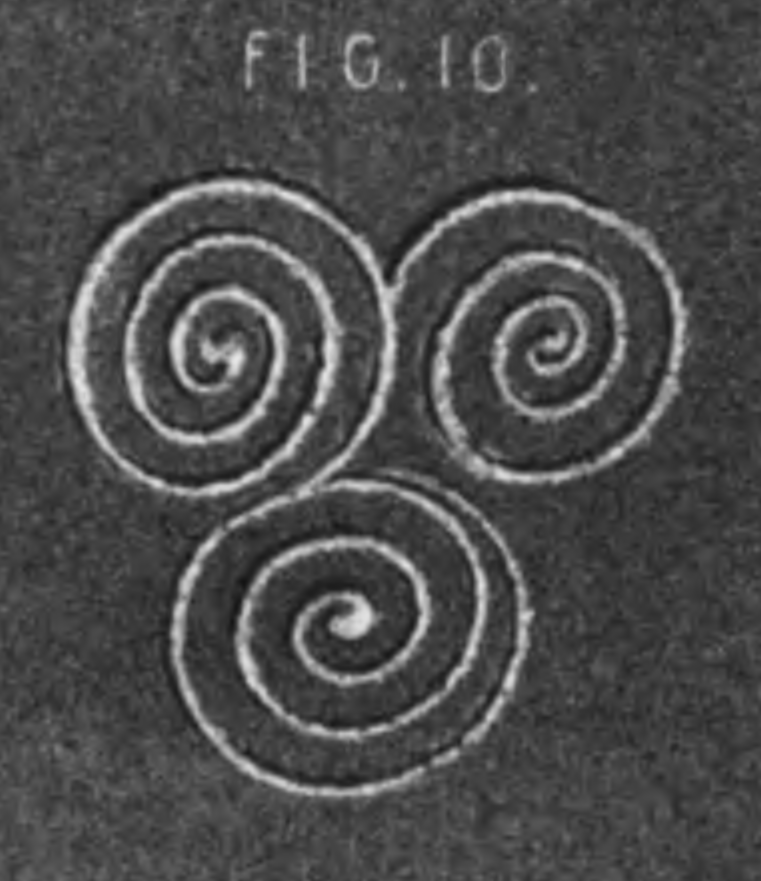
An illustration from Simpson's book on archaic sculpturing

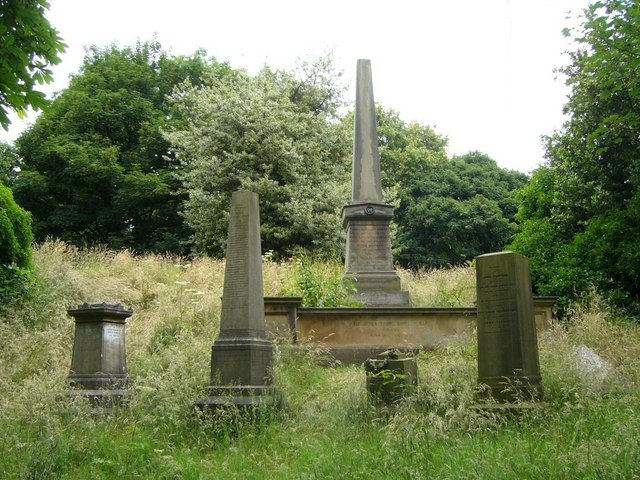
Grindlay-Simpson family grave (marked by tall obelisk), Warriston Cemetery, Edinburgh

== See also ==
- Charles Thomas Jackson, claimed to have pioneered the use of diethyl ether
- Crawford Williamson Long, discovered the anaesthetic effect of diethyl ether
- William Thomas Green Morton, pioneered the use of diethyl ether in surgery
- Humphry Davy, first suggested the use of nitrous oxide in 1799
- Horace Wells, in 1844 pioneered the use of nitrous oxide in the US

Baronetage of the United Kingdom
New creation	Baronet (of Strathavon and the City of Edinburgh); 1866–1870	Succeeded by Walter Grindlay Simpson
Academic offices
Preceded by James Hamilton	Professor of Midwifery, Edinburgh; 1840-1870	Succeeded by Alexander Russell Simpson
