= Alexander Anderson (botanist) =

Scottish surgeon and botanist (1748–1811)

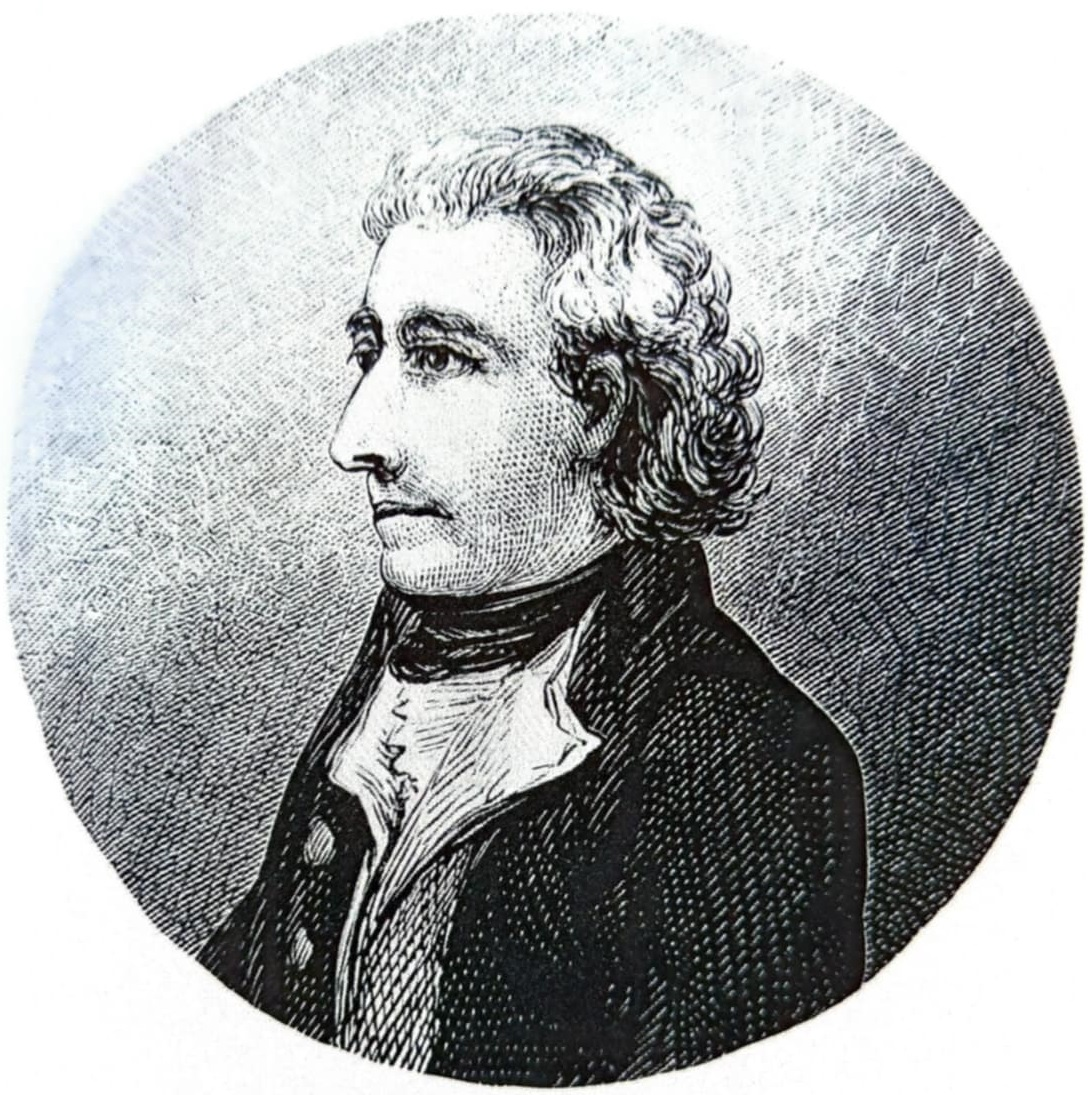
- Born: 1748; Aberdeen
- Died: 1811 (aged 62–63)
- Education: University of Edinburgh
- Occupations: Surgeon, explorer and botanist
- Scientific career
- Fields: Botany

Alexander Anderson FRSE FLS (1748–1811) was a Scottish surgeon, explorer and botanist who worked as Superintendent to the Botanical Garden on the Windward Island of Saint Vincent from 1785 to 1811.

== Early life and education ==
Born in Aberdeen, Anderson later studied at the University of Edinburgh, where he was tutored by William Cullen (professor of medicine and chemistry) and John Hope (professor of botany and materia medica). Fellow Aberdonian William Forsyth briefly employed him at the Chelsea Physic Garden in London, prior to Anderson's emigration to New York in 1774, where he stayed with his brother John, a printer. After a petition was lodged by physicians William Wright and Thomas Clarke of Jamaica in 1798, Anderson was awarded an honorary 'Degree of Doctor in Physick' from the University of St. Andrews. The petition identified him 'assistant surgeon to his Majesty's forces in St. Vincent' and confirmed he had been 'educated in Scotland' with knowledge 'in all branches of Medicine, Natural History and Philosophy'.

Less is known of Anderson's demeanour, but an entry from the Journal of British botanist Henrietta Liston in 1800 described him as a 'kind', 'good-looking Scotchman', very 'liberal in giving his plants', and 'very kind in his offers of supplying [Liston] on [her] return to Scotland'.

== Family ==
Records indicate that Anderson married Elizabeth Alexander of Antigua, who Liston described as 'very deaf' from 'some accident'. They appear to have produced a daughter named Elizabeth, who later married John Pemberton Ross, Speaker of the House of Assembly on St. Vincent. Anderson's wife is recorded in a Journal of the House of Commons dated 1815, receiving £100 per annum as 'window of Dr. Alexander Anderson, in consideration of his services as Superintendent of the Botanical Garden at St. Vincent's'. Anderson's nephew Alexander Anderson – one of America's first wood-engravers – recorded a 'visit to [his] uncle', 'King's botanist in the Island of St. Vincent', in 1798: he 'remained at the Botanic Garden (a perfect paradise at that time) for about three months', but rejected an employment offer that 'would have made [him] independent'.

== Botanic Garden at Saint Vincent ==
Beginning in 1785, Anderson served as one of the first two superintendent curators of the St Vincent botanic garden, along with George Young. Anderson worked at the Botanic Garden for over 25 years, during which he conducted travels throughout the Guianas, St. Vincent, Trinidad and Tobago, and discovered more than 100 varieties of Caribbean plants new to botanical science. During his tenure the number of species at the garden increased from 348 to over 3,000. He was a correspondent of Sir Joseph Banks, through whom he contributed to the Royal Society in 1789 an account of a bituminous lake on St. Vincent, which was afterwards published in the Philosophical Transactions for that year.

In January 1791 he was elected a Fellow of the Royal Society of Edinburgh, proposed by Daniel Rutherford, John Walker and William Wright. In the same year he went into Guiana on a botanising expedition; the plants he obtained being sent to Banks, are now in the herbarium of the British Museum. He was also elected to the American Philosophical Society in that year.

The Society of Arts voted him a silver medal in 1798 for a paper upon the plants in the garden at St Vincent. He contemplated the production of a flora of the Caribbean islands, some sheets of which he sent to Banks; but this project was never carried out. He resigned his post in July 1811, and died on 8 September in the same year (the Royal Society of Edinburgh gives his date of death as 10 May 1811).

Anderson was succeeded as superintendent by his friend, the surgeon William Lochhead.

== The breadfruit ==
On 23 January 1793, Dr. Anderson informed Sir Joseph Banks of Captain William Bligh's arrival on HMS Providence with 'about 100 of the Breadfruit' from Tahiti. To Anderson's frustration, 'partiality' for the botanic gardens at Jamaica ensured that he was left with 'the smallest and most sickly looking plants'; the 'largest and most healthy' sent north to the establishments at Liguanea and Bath. Although William Bligh has been credited for the introduction of Breadfruit in the Caribbean, records compiled by the Reverend Lansdown Guilding suggest that Anderson had received specimens - 'previous to thee arrival of the Providence' - when 'a young plant... was sent to the Garden' from French naturalists in Martinique. In the Journal of Henrietta Liston (1800), the Breadfruit is recorded at St. Vincent 'in great abundance & perfection', Anderson being 'the only person' on the Island who had 'as yet obliged his slaves' to eat it.

== Relations with St. Vincent's Governors ==
According to Anderson's Account, relations with the Island's authorities were periodically tempestuous. His first altercation occurred with Governor Edmund Lincoln, who administered St. Vincent between 1783 - 1787. Letters to William Forsyth indicate that Anderson's appointment at the Garden was contested by the Governor, who in 1785 '[appropriated] the ground and [superintendent's] house to his own use'; namely as a 'common pasture for his cattle'. Having remodelled the house for the 'convenience' of his own wife and child, Anderson was forced to seek refuge at a Tavern in Kingstown, the 'expense of which was far above [his] finances'. After Lincoln threatened to 'alienate [the Garden] from the Crown', the dispute was finally resolved when London's War Office dispatched the 'necessary orders' to '[re-establish] the old Botanic Garden and House'; albeit with a warning that its 'permanent' survival would depend on Anderson's 'attention to the most ridgid[sic] economy'.

Despite Governor Valentine Morris' ostensible 'fondness of horticulture and rural economy', Anderson's predecessor Dr. George Young had previously failed to secure the necessary 'assistance and support' for the Garden between 1772 - 1776, with 'the unhappy state of island politics' precluding the allocation of 'useful labour and funds'.

== Foreign Communications and Exchanges ==
Anderson's network of foreign correspondence was extensive. During his time at the Saint Vincent Botanic Garden the number of 'correspondents became so large that great part of [his] time and attention were taken up in answering them'. As per his Account, the scarcity of scientific expertise in the Caribbean obliged Anderson to cultivate a 'correspondence with scientific men' and 'particularly lovers of botany in every part to which a communication could be kept open'; primarily to ensure 'liberal returns for seeds and plants' from around the globe.

In North America, some of Anderson's most notable correspondents included Thomas Jefferson, George Washington and Benjamin Vaughan, the then negotiator for Britain in drafting the Treaty of Paris. Surviving letters between Anderson and Washington show that seeds were sent from St. Vincent during 1789, after which time he received specimens of olive tree. A year later in 1790 Jefferson sent seeds of 'the dry red rice' to the Botanic Garden and informed Anderson of future opportunities for importing it from China.

Other correspondents in the Americas included the Spanish Governor of Trinidad José Maria Chacón - whose 'liberal sentiments' and 'encouragement' for 'adventurers from British islands' allowed him to 'reap a great harvest [of plants]' in 1786 - and a host of unnamed contacts on the Island of St. Lucia. Anderson identified one of these individuals as 'a gentleman' who 'obtained [the true Cinnamon]', then carried on a frigate ferrying 'valuable plants' from the Île de France to St. Domingo.

As per the nationality of Anderson's correspondents, approximately three, eight, eight and sixteen per cent of individuals were American, Spanish, Dutch, and left unspecified respectively. The remaining sixty-five per cent were French; 'the most valuable correspondents [in the Caribbean Archipelago being] those from the French colonies'. Given the Bourbon Monarchy's fundamentally more efficient paradigm of inter-continental plant transfer, French Caribbean islands 'possessed many more' exotic foods, botanic 'necessities, and comforts of life', which Anderson attempted to import for his Garden at St. Vincent. His Account indicates that without adequate British support for colonial botany, the Superintendent was obliged to seek out French contacts from St. Domingue, Guadeloupe, Martinique, St. Lucia and French Guiana for rare plant species.

Some of Anderson's most notable French contacts included the Marquis de Bouillé François Claude Amour de Chariol and Jean-Baptiste Victor Hughes. In 1802, Anderson sent 'some boxes, with plants [he] conceived were not [at Cayenne]' to Hughes in return for the True Nutmeg.

== Caribbean Explorations ==
Anderson travelled extensively during his time on St. Vincent. Given the Island's southerly location and restrictions imposed on foreign visitors by Spanish Governors in South America, he periodically launched expeditions to the colonies of Trinidad and Dutch Guiana, including Berbice, Demerary and Essequibo. Notable voyages to the latter colonies were undertaken in 1791, when Anderson travelled with his botanical assistant William Lochhead on a small schooner to examine its plants; the colonies 'having been very little visited by naturalists', with their 'interior parts' generally considered impenetrable. Anderson arrived at Barbadoes on 6 March in order to collect information about navigating Guiana's 'low and dangerous coast' before reaching the mouth of the River Demerary on the 19th. As per his Account, he was met with 'a number of the most beautiful and rare shrubs as well as herbaceous plants nowhere else found'. By June Anderson and Lochhead had returned to the mouth, later liaising with the nephew of the Dutch anatomist Bernhard Siegfried Albinus and Mr. Cummings, an unidentified 'Scotchman by birth'. They returned to St. Vincent with a number of new plants that were beyond Anderson's 'most sanguine expectations'.

Communications to the Royal Society indicate that Anderson also embarked on an excursion to Trinidad in 1789 with the intention of exploring a bituminous lake then known as 'La Bray', or 'Tar Lake'. His report was read in London on 19 February. Five years earlier Anderson had conducted the first recorded ascent of Morne Garou, a mountain on St. Vincent. His description of its volcano and summit was similarly published in the Royal Society's Philosophical Transactions in 1784, and the expedition was reportedly made possible by the hospitality of an unidentified Frenchman by the name of 'Mr. Gasco'. According to Lansdown Guilding, it was during this expedition that Anderson discovered the crater of Morne Soufriére.

Previous to his appointment as Superintendent of the Botanic Garden at St. Vincent, Anderson had spent several months in Grenada before obtaining leave from General Matthews to visit the island of Dominica. He had formerly conducted expeditions on the Island of St. Lucia and undertook a voyage to the Spanish Main on Sibylle-class frigate with the help of General Cornelius Cuyler.

== Medicines and Pharmacopeia ==
Many of the plants and seeds that Anderson obtained via his foreign correspondents were considered pharmacologically significant. Historians have shown that the profound ecological turbulence wrought by the large-scale cultivation of sugar had by the eighteenth century created a demographically catastrophic disease environment for miscellaneous Caribbean 'fevers'. In St. Vincent, high mortality rates were generally attributable to yaws, dysentery, malaria and smallpox. In a letter dated 16 February 1785, Anderson's predecessor Dr. George Young had written to General Robert Melville expressing his concern for the British soldiers reportedly dying at a 'rate of two to one' during their first four years on the Island, with children - 'almost all of three years of age and under' - particularly vulnerable to 'certain destruction in the West Indies'.

In the scramble to find prophylactics drugs and treatments, Anderson experimented with herbal remedies in St. Vincent and later produced his Hortus St. Vincentii: a list of plants then cultivated at the Garden that he believed to be medically efficacious against diseases like 'dropsy', ringworm and rheumatism. Many of these plant species were sent to Anderson by French botanists at Cayenne, but others were obtained from the Island's enslaved population.
