= Richard Lancake =

English botanical illustrator

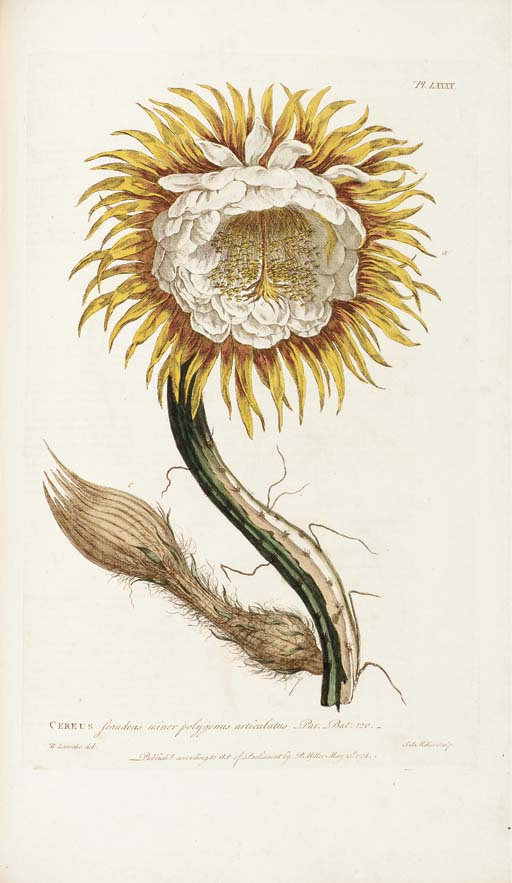
Cereus scandens

Richard Lancake, fl. 1760, was an English botanical illustrator best known for his contributions to Philip Miller's The Gardeners Dictionary.

In 1768 Lancake started a papermaking factory in Paris which soon went bankrupt.
