= Lochead =

Lochead is a surname. Notable people with the surname include:

- Bill Lochead (born 1954), Canadian ice hockey player
- Daniel Cameron Lochead (1878–1946), Canadian politician
- James Lochead (1923–1999), American figure skater
- William Lochead (c. 1753 – 1815), Scottish surgeon and botanist
