= Cloverdale, Alabama =

Cloverdale, Alabama may refer to the following places in Alabama:

- Cloverdale, Lauderdale County, Alabama, an unincorporated community
- Cloverdale, Montgomery, a neighborhood of Montgomery
