= Bruce Forsyth =

British entertainer and presenter (1928–2017)

Sir Bruce Forsyth CBE
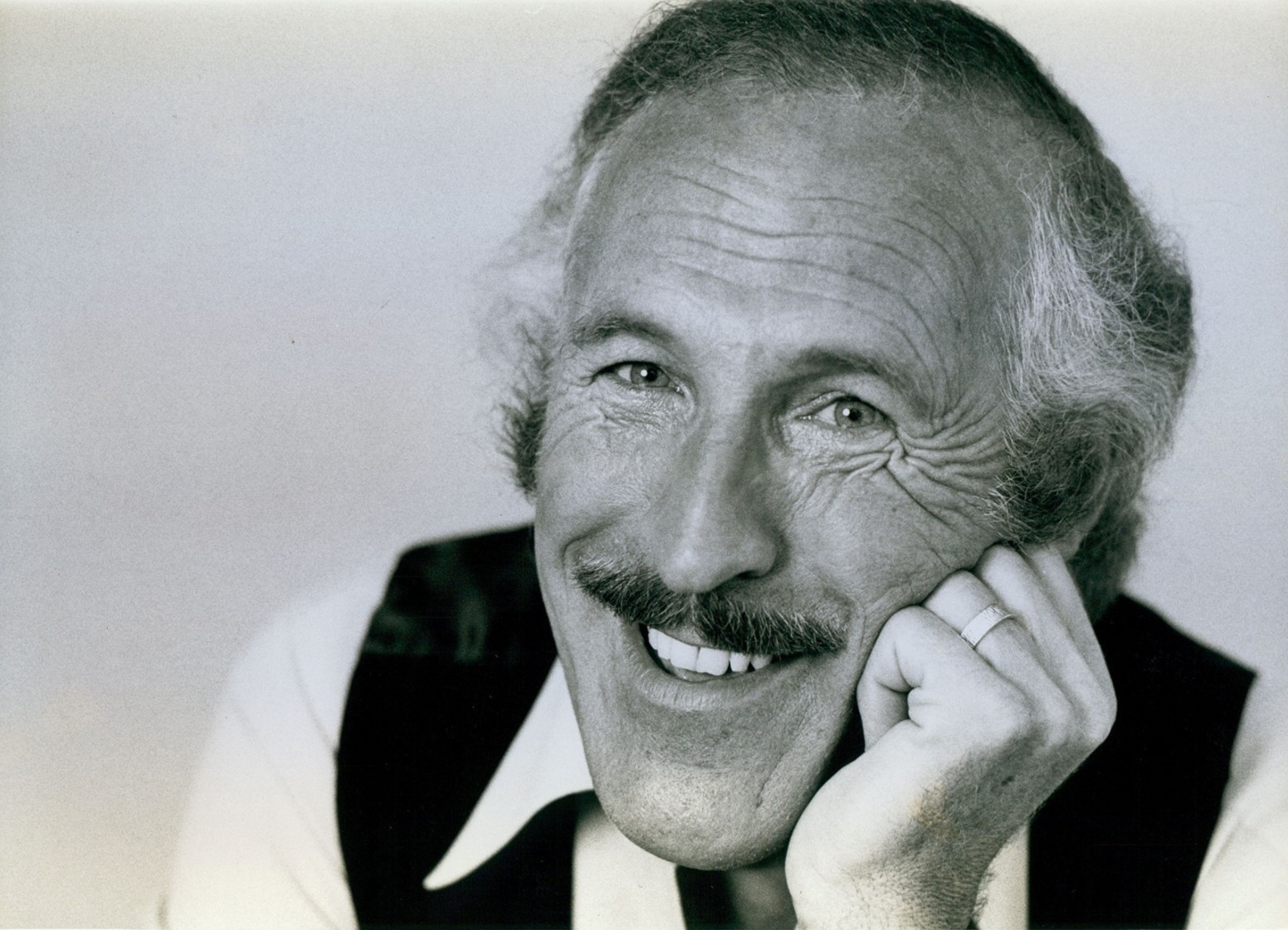
- Forsyth in 1979
- Born: Bruce Joseph Forsyth-Johnson; 22 February 1928; Edmonton, Middlesex, England
- Died: 18 August 2017 (aged 89); Virginia Water, Surrey, England
- Resting place: London Palladium
- Other names: Boy Bruce, the Mighty Atom; Brucie
- Occupations: Presenter; actor; comedian; singer; dancer; screenwriter
- Years active: 1939–2015
- Spouses: Penny Calvert (m. 1953; div. 1973) Anthea Redfern (m. 1973; div. 1979) Wilnelia Merced (m. 1983)
- Children: 6
- Relatives: Joseph Forsyth Johnson (great-grandfather); William Forsyth (4× great-grandfather, dubious)
- Awards: Knight Bachelor (2011)
- Military career
- Allegiance: United Kingdom
- Branch: Royal Air Force
- Service years: 1947–1949
- Unit: Film Unit

Sir Bruce Joseph Forsyth-Johnson (22 February 1928 – 18 August 2017), also known as Brucie, was a British entertainer and television presenter whose career spanned over 75 years. His appeal stemmed from his showmanship, quick wit, and ability to connect with audiences, a talent honed during years on the post-war variety circuit. His legacy is marked by a transition from traditional music hall performance to the evolving world of television.

Forsyth started his live public performances aged 14, and hosted the variety show Sunday Night at the London Palladium for three years. From the 1970s to the 1990s, Forsyth became famous for presenting several successful British game shows. He is particularly remembered for his work on the BBC series The Generation Game, which he hosted from 1971 to 1977 and again from 1990 to 1994. Moving to ITV, he hosted other successful game shows, including Play Your Cards Right (the British version of Card Sharks) from 1980 to 1987, 1994 to 1999 and from 2002 to 2003, and Bruce's Price is Right (the British version of The Price is Right) from 1995 to 2001.

Forsyth found a new generation of fans by co-hosting the BBC's talent show Strictly Come Dancing with Tess Daly from 2004 to 2013. He was an enthusiastic and lifelong supporter of numerous charities, particularly those concerned with the welfare of children, disabled people, and animals. Forsyth was made an Officer of the Order of the British Empire in 1998, a Commander of the same order in 2006, and a Knight Bachelor in the 2011 Birthday Honours for services to entertainment and charity. In 2012, Guinness World Records recognised Forsyth as having the longest television career for a male entertainer. Towards the end of his life, Forsyth suffered from ill health, which reduced his appearances in public. He made his last full TV appearance on the Strictly Children in Need Special in 2015.

== Early life ==
Bruce Joseph Forsyth-Johnson was born on Victoria Road in Edmonton, Middlesex, on 22 February 1928, the son of Florence Ada (née Pocknell) and John Thomas Forsyth-Johnson. His family owned a car repair garage and, as members of the Salvation Army, his parents played brass instruments; his mother was a singer.

His great-grandfather Joseph Forsyth Johnson was a landscape architect who worked in several countries, and Bruce believed that his great-great-great-great-grandfather was William Forsyth (1737–1804) a founder of the Royal Horticultural Society and the namesake of the plant genus Forsythia. However both of William's sons died without heirs so William had no direct male descendants.

Following the outbreak of the Second World War, Forsyth was evacuated to Clacton-on-Sea. Shortly after he arrived, Forsyth's parents allowed him to return to London because he felt homesick. On 21 May 1943, Forsyth's older brother John, who was serving as a pilot in the Royal Air Force, was killed aged 20 during a training exercise at RAF Turnberry; he is commemorated on the Runnymede Memorial. Forsyth attended the Latymer School. After watching Fred Astaire in films at the age of eight, he trained in dance in Tottenham and then Brixton.

== Career ==
=== Boy Bruce, the Mighty Atom ===
Forsyth started his live public performances aged 14, with a song, dance and accordion act called Boy Bruce, the Mighty Atom. His first appearance was at the Theatre Royal in Bilston, with The Great Marzo at the top of the bill. He had made his television debut in 1939 as a child, singing and dancing on BBC talent show Come and Be Televised, broadcast from Radiolympia and introduced by Jasmine Bligh.

=== Post-war work ===
After the war, with the goal of joining Moss Empires theatres, he spent years on stage with little success and travelled the UK working seven days a week, doing summer seasons, pantomimes and circuses, where he became renowned for his strong-man act. His act was interrupted by national service when he was conscripted into the Royal Air Force at the age of 19, which he later reflected taught him "respect and discipline".

In 1958, an appearance with the comedian Dickie Henderson led to his being offered the job of compère of Val Parnell's weekly TV variety show, Sunday Night at the London Palladium. He hosted the show for two years, followed by a year's break, then returned for another year. His schedule of stage performances, which continued throughout the 1960s, forced him to give up the job of host.

Forsyth on front of "Every Night at the Palladium" souvenir brochure, 1962

Forsyth appeared in the London production of Little Me, along with Avril Angers in 1964. In the musical film Star! (1968), a biopic of stage actress Gertrude Lawrence, he played alongside lead performer Julie Andrews as Lawrence's father.

On 7 October 1968, he was top of the bill on the opening night of the Golden Garter nightclub, Wythenshawe. Two years later, he played Swinburne in the Disney fantasy film Bedknobs and Broomsticks. In 1976, he appeared on The Muppet Show, where he took on the duo Statler and Waldorf.

=== Game show host ===
During his spell of hosting Sunday Night at the London Palladium as part of the show he hosted the 15-minute game show Beat the Clock. Forsyth's next success was The Generation Game (BBC1, 1971–1977, 1990–1994), which proved popular and attracted huge Saturday evening audiences. It was on this show that Forsyth introduced his "The Thinker" pose, emulating Rodin's sculpture, appearing in silhouette each week after the opening titles. This pose is reminiscent of the circus strong-man attitude, and Forsyth used it on many shows he later hosted. He also wrote and sang the theme for the show "Life is the Name of the Game." Millions of viewers became familiar with the rasp of Forsyth's north London accented voice and his "distinctively pointy" chin that he emphasised in poses such as the "human question mark", with chin over raised knee. During his time as host of The Generation Game he began using what would become his signature 'call and response' greeting with the studio audience, "It's nice to see you, to see you...", to which the audience would loudly reply, "Nice!"; he used this on many shows he later hosted for the rest of his career. In his music hall days, Forsyth had experimented with the response "Too!", but this was no way as successful as the later television version. He was replaced on The Generation Game by Larry Grayson.

In 1977 he announced that he was leaving television to take the star role in a new musical, The Travelling Music Show, based on the songs of Anthony Newley and Leslie Bricusse. The show did reasonably well in provincial theatre, but received poor reviews when it moved to London and it closed after four months in July 1978.

London Weekend Television persuaded him to return to the screen later that year to present Bruce Forsyth's Big Night, a two-hour Saturday-night show on ITV encompassing a variety of different entertainment formats (later reduced to 90 minutes). However, the show was not a success and lasted for just one series. Forsyth remained with ITV, hosting the game show Play Your Cards Right, which was the UK version of the US original Card Sharks, from 1980 to 1987, 1994 to 1999, and a brief period from 2002 to 2003, before the show was pulled mid-run.

In 1986, he went to the United States to host a game show on ABC, Bruce Forsyth's Hot Streak, which ran for 65 episodes from January to April that year. Shortly after, Forsyth was considered by Mark Goodson to be a candidate for hosting the revival of ''Card Sharks''; ultimately the jobs went to Bob Eubanks (for the daytime version that aired on CBS), and Bill Rafferty (who hosted the night-time syndicated version). Forsyth starred in the Thames Television sitcom Slinger's Day in 1986 and 1987, a sequel to Tripper's Day which had starred Leonard Rossiter, whom Forsyth replaced in the new show. He was the original host of You Bet! (1988 to 1990).

Forsyth fronted the third version of The Price Is Right (1995 to 2001), titled Bruce's Price Is Right during his era as the host. His unsuccessful gameshows include Takeover Bid (1990 to 1991), Hollywood Or Bust (1984), and Didn't They Do Well! (2004). During the 1970s Forsyth featured in the Stork margarine adverts on television,; during the 1980s and 1990s he appeared in an advertising campaign for the furniture retailer Courts, in which he dressed as a judge.

Forsyth celebrated his 70th birthday in 1998 and appeared in a week-long run of his one-man show at the London Palladium. In 2000, Forsyth hosted a revived series called Tonight at the London Palladium.

=== Career revival ===
In 2003, and again in 2010, Forsyth was a guest presenter on the news and satire quiz show Have I Got News for You. Forsyth had called Paul Merton, one of the team captains on the show, to suggest himself as a guest presenter. He co-presented Strictly Come Dancing with Tess Daly from 2004 to 2013, formally stepping down from hosting the regular live show in April 2014. This decision was made to reduce his workload and for the preparation of pre-recorded specials.

On 7 April 2010, Forsyth became one of the first three celebrities to be subjected to the British version of the American institution of a comedy roast, on Channel 4's A Comedy Roast. Forsyth was the subject of the BBC genealogy series Who Do You Think You Are?, broadcast on 19 July 2010. On 20 March 2010, Forsyth appeared on the autobiography-interview programme Piers Morgan's Life Stories, which was broadcast on ITV.

In 2011, Forsyth released a collection of songs on CD called These Are My Favourites. He chose the songs for their personal and musical importance, including a duet with his granddaughter, Sophie Purdie. These Are My Favourites also includes a recording of "Paper Moon" with Nat King Cole.

=== Charity work ===
Forsyth was an enthusiastic and lifelong supporter of numerous charities, particularly those focused on helping children, disabled people, and animals.

In 2001, Forsyth became a patron of the international charity EveryChild, which supports vulnerable children around the world. For his 80th birthday in 2008, he requested that people donate to EveryChild instead of buying him presents.

Forsyth was heavily involved with the charity Variety, which assists disabled and disadvantaged children. As part of this work, he helped provide the charity with its signature "Sunshine Coaches," which are specially adapted minibuses.

Forsyth was a supporter and ambassador for the children's charity Caudwell Children, appearing at many of their fundraising events.

A patron of this Surrey-based charity for over two decades, Forsyth supported its work by attending events, playing in golf tournaments, and donating Strictly Come Dancing tickets for auctions.

An avid golfer, Forsyth played in and hosted numerous pro-celebrity tournaments for many good causes, including his own Bruce Forsyth Pro-Am Charity Classic. Events he hosted at his home on the Wentworth estate raised hundreds of thousands of pounds for Sparks, a charity that supports children's medical research.

He also lent his support to organisations such as Cats Protection, Help for Heroes, and the Royal Osteoporosis Society.

Forsyth regularly participated in fundraising drives, including a charity auction for child victims of the Balkan conflict and specials for the BBC's Children in Need, including a special episode of Strictly Come Dancing.

== Tributes and honours ==
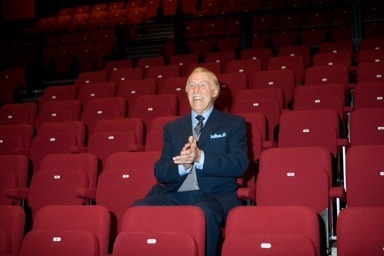
Forsyth opening The Sir Bruce Forsyth Auditorium at the Millfield Theatre, Enfield, in October 2009

Forsyth's showbiz awards include Variety Club Show Business Personality of the Year in 1975; TV Times Male TV Personality of the Year, in 1975, 1976, 1977 and 1978; and BBC TV Personality of the Year in 1991.

On 7 June 1959 Forsyth was inducted into the elite entertainers' fraternity, the Grand Order of Water Rats, Water Rat number 566.

In 1987, a fan club was created – the Great Bruce Forsyth Social Club. They would later go on to assist Forsyth in singing his opening number, "It's Never Too Late", at his Audience With show. He repaid this favour by adding the society to his busy schedule in June 1997 and appeared at their 10th annual general meeting in Plymouth.

Forsyth was appointed Officer of the Order of the British Empire (OBE) in the 1998 Birthday Honours, and Commander of the Order of the British Empire (CBE) in the 2006 New Year Honours.

On 27 February 2005, the BBC screened A BAFTA Tribute to Bruce Forsyth to mark the entertainer's 60 years in show business. He had a bronze bust of himself unveiled at the London Palladium in May 2005. The sculpture was created by his son-in-law and is on display in the theatre's Cinderella Bar.

In 2008, Forsyth received the BAFTA Fellowship. In 2009, he was awarded the Theatre Performer's Award at the annual Carl Alan Awards. Hosted by the International Dance Teachers' Association, the awards are voted for by the leading dance organisations in the United Kingdom and recognise those who have made an exceptional contribution to the world of dance and theatre.

Forsyth received a Royal Television Society Lifetime Achievement Award on 17 March 2009. On 26 January 2011 he received the National Television Awards special recognition award.

Forsyth was made a Knight Bachelor in the 2011 Birthday Honours for services to entertainment and charity. This followed a years-long public campaign to award him a knighthood. His investiture, by Queen Elizabeth II, took place on 12 October 2011.

In July 2012, Forsyth was given the honour of carrying the Olympic flame through London, as it finally reached the city on the penultimate day of the London 2012 Torch Relay.

Forsyth earned a place in the 2013 Guinness Book of World Records as the male TV entertainer having had the longest career, calling it a "wonderful surprise". He also appeared at the 2013 Glastonbury Festival on the Avalon stage, becoming the oldest performer to ever play at the festival. In 2018 the NTAs honoured the memory of Forsyth by naming an NTA award after him.

== Personal life ==
From 1953 until their divorce in 1973, Forsyth was married to Penny Calvert with whom he had three daughters. One of his daughters, Julie, is a songwriter and singer, who found fame in the 1970s as part of the Top 10 hitmakers Guys 'n' Dolls and would go on to compose the UK's entry in the 1988 Eurovision Song Contest.

In 1973, he married Anthea Redfern, the hostess on The Generation Game. They had two daughters, before they too divorced in 1979. Asked to judge the 1980 Miss World competition, Forsyth met Puerto Rican beauty queen Wilnelia Merced, who was the 1975 winner and a fellow judge. They married in 1983 and had one son together.

Forsyth lived on the Wentworth Estate in Surrey. Until 2000, he also occupied a flat in Nell Gwynn House, Sloane Avenue, Chelsea.

=== Political views ===
In January 1968 Pye Records issued as a single "I'm Backing Britain", supporting the economic campaign of the same name, written by Tony Hatch and Jackie Trent, and sung by Forsyth. The chorus included "The feeling is growing, so let's keep it going, the good times are blowing our way". All involved in making the single took cuts in their fees or royalties so that the single sold for 5s. instead of the going rate of 7s. 4 1/2d. Forsyth happily endorsed the campaign, saying "The country has always done its best when it is up against the wall. If everyone realises what we are up against we can get out of trouble easily." The song did not make the charts, selling only 7,319 copies.

Forsyth was a supporter of the Conservative Party, admired Margaret Thatcher, and attended fundraising events for the party.

In 2008, he told the Radio Times that he was a fan of Prime Minister's Questions, describing the weekly debates between then prime minister Gordon Brown and then leader of the opposition David Cameron as "pure vaudeville", and remarked that the verbal jousting of Brown and Cameron reminded him of the comedians Frankie Howerd and Les Dawson.

During a 2008 appearance on the BBC's This Week, he expressed his admiration for the US political system's primary debates, suggesting a similar system could make UK politics more exciting.

In August 2014, Forsyth was one of 200 public figures who signed a letter to The Guardian expressing their hope that Scotland would vote to remain part of the United Kingdom in September's referendum on that issue.

In a 2015 interview with the Radio Times, he declined to reveal his specific party allegiance, explaining that it is more accepted for entertainers to state their preference in the United States than in the UK.

== Illness and death ==
Towards the end of his life, Forsyth suffered from ill health, which reduced his appearances in public. On 8 October 2015, he was admitted to hospital for cuts and minor concussion after tripping over a rug at his home and hitting his head. A month later, he made his last full TV appearance on Strictly Children in Need Special, with filming for this taking place prior to him undergoing surgery for an abdominal aortic aneurysm on 12 November. As a result of his surgery, Forsyth was unable to host that year's Strictly Come Dancing Christmas Special as planned, but a spokesman representing him later stated he would play a part in the production, recording a special video message for it.

After 2015, Forsyth made no further public appearances, as his health began to decline, with his wife commenting that he struggled to move easily following his surgery. On 26 February 2017, he was again admitted to hospital with a severe chest infection and spent five days in intensive care, before returning home on 3 March 2017.

On 18 August 2017, Forsyth died of bronchial pneumonia at his Wentworth Estate home in Virginia Water, aged 89. Several celebrities paid tribute to Forsyth following his death, including his former Strictly Come Dancing co-host Tess Daly; his friends Michael Parkinson, Jimmy Tarbuck, and Des O'Connor, the BBC director general Tony Hall and the then Prime Minister, Theresa May. BBC One aired Sir Bruce Forsyth – Mr Entertainment, in place of the scheduled The One Show, in tribute. Forsyth was cremated on 5 September 2017 in a private ceremony attended only by close family and friends.

A few days later, on 9 September 2017, when that year's series of Strictly Come Dancing began, it paid tribute to Forsyth with a special ballroom dance routine from their professional dancers. On 14 December 2017, the BBC announced that it would produce a tribute show to Forsyth at the London Palladium on 21 February 2018. Hosted by his Strictly Come Dancing co-host Tess Daly, Sir Bruce: A Celebration was broadcast on BBC One on 11 March 2018. On 18 August 2018, the first anniversary of his death, Forsyth's ashes were laid to rest beneath the stage at the London Palladium in a private ceremony.

== Filmography ==
=== Film and television ===
Year	Title	Role	Notes
1958–1964	Sunday Night at the London Palladium	Host	TV series
1961	The Royal Variety Performance	Host	TV series
1965–1973	The Bruce Forsyth Show	Host	TV series
1966; 1975	Frankie and Bruce	Co-star	TV movie documentary
1968	Star!	Arthur Lawrence	Film
1969	Can Heironymus Merkin Ever Forget Mercy Humppe and Find True Happiness?	Uncle Limelight	Film
1969	Red Peppers	George Pepper	TV movie
1971	Bedknobs and Broomsticks	Swinburne, Bookman's henchman	Film
1971	The Magnificent Seven Deadly Sins	Clayton	Film (segment "Avarice")
1971	The Royal Variety Performance	Host	TV series
1971–1977; 1990–1994	The Generation Game	Host	TV series; 207 episodes
1973	The Good Old Days	Guest star	TV series
1974	Bruce Forsyth Meets Lulu	Host	TV movie
1976	The Mating Season	Bruce Gillespie	TV series
1976	The Muppet Show	Guest star	TV series
1978	Bruce Forsyth's Big Night	Host	TV series
1980	Sammy and Bruce	Co-star	TV movie
1980–1987; 1994–1999; 2002–2003	Play Your Cards Right	Host	TV series
1983	Anna Pavlova	Alfred Batt	TV series
1984	Hollywood or Bust	Host	TV series
1986	Bruce Forsyth's Hot Streak	Host	TV series
1986	Magnum, P.I.	Lottery Host	TV series Episode: "A Little Bit of Luck...A Little Bit of Grief"
1986–1987	Slinger's Day	Cecil Slinger	TV series
1988	The Royal Variety Performance	Co-host with Ronnie Corbett	TV series
1988	Bruce and Ronnie	Co-star	TV series
1988–1990	You Bet!	Host	TV series
1990–1991	Takeover Bid	Host	TV series
1992	Fiddly Foodle Bird	Narrator	TV series
1992–1993	Bruce's Guest Night	Host	TV series
1995–2001	Bruce's Price Is Right	Host	TV series
1997	An Audience with Bruce Forsyth	Host	TV special
2000	House!	Himself	Film, (final film role)
2000	Tonight at the London Palladium	Host	TV series
2003, 2010	Have I Got News for You	Guest Host	TV series
2004	Didn't They Do Well	Host	TV series
2004–2013, 2014–15 specials	Strictly Come Dancing (Note: He was co host for three specials after 2013 – the Children in Need specials in 2014 and 2015, and the 2014 Christmas Special. He made a guest appearance for the 2015 Christmas Special via Video Message, which was his final television appearance.)	Co-host with Tess Daly	TV series
2010	Who Do You Think You Are?	Guest	TV series documentary
2011	The Rob Brydon Show	Guest	TV series
2012	National Television Awards	Guest (With Ant & Dec)	TV special
2013	Ant & Dec's Saturday Night Takeaway (Little Ant & Dec segment)	Guest	TV series
2013	When Miranda Met Bruce	Guest star	TV special
2014	Perspectives: Bruce Forsyth on Sammy Davis Jr	Host	TV series documentary
2014	Bruce's Hall of Fame	Host	TV movie

=== Stage ===
Year	Title	Role	Notes
1958–2004	One-man show which had various titles	Himself	Intermittently toured UK
1962	Every Night at the Palladium	Himself	Starred with Morecambe and Wise in a season at the London Palladium
1964	Little Me	Various Characters	A 334 performance season at the Cambridge Theatre
1978	The Travelling Music Show	Fred Limelight	A four-month season at Her Majesty's Theatre, before touring the UK
1979	Bruce Forsyth on Broadway	Himself	A five performance season of his one-man show at the Winter Garden Theatre from 12–17 June
2012–2015	Bruce Forsyth Entertains	Himself	Toured the UK

== Discography ==
=== Albums ===
Title	Album details	Peak chart positions
Title	Album details	UK
Mister Entertainment	Released: 1960; Label: Parlophone: PMC 1132 (Mono) / PCS 3013 (Stereo)	—
The Musical Side of Bruce	Released: 1973; Label: Pye: NSPL 18405	—
Both Sides of Bruce (Live)	Released: 1977; Label: Warner Bros.	—
Come Get It!	Released: 1979; Label: Pye	—
Mr. Entertainment	Released: 19 March 2007; Label: EMI	—
These Are My Favourites	Released: 7 November 2011; Label: EMI	58

=== Singles ===
- 1959, "Excerpts from The Desert Song (No. 2)", with June Bronhill, Edmund Hockridge, Inia Te Wiata, The Williams Singers, Michael Collins and His Orchestra (7-inch EP), His Master's Voice: 7EG 8676
- 1960, "I'm a Good Boy", Parlophone
- 1960, "I'm in Charge" (7-inch), Parlophone: 45-R 4535
- 1962, "The Oh-Be-Joyfuls (7-inch), Piccadilly: 7N.35086
- 1964, "Real Live Girl" (7-inch), Pye: 7N.15744
- 1964, "Saturday Sunshine" (7-inch), Piccadilly: 7N.35169
- 1964, "The Mysterious People" (7-inch), Piccadilly: 1189
- 1965, "Real Live Girl" (7-inch), Blue Cat: BC 105
- 1968, "I'm Backing Britain" / "There's Not Enough Love in the World", Pye
- 1973, "Didn't He Do Well?" (7-inch), Philips: 6006 285
- 1978, "Love Medley", with Valerie Walsh (7), CBS: S CBS 6469

== In popular culture ==
Neopets, a virtual pet website, had a collectible character which was originally a direct representation of Forsyth himself. The pet was later renamed to just "Bruce" and his appearance changed to that of a penguin to better fit with the other pets on the platform. Despite the change, the pet retained Forsyth's iconic bow tie.
