= Andrew Caster =

Andrew Caster is an American ophthalmologist and a cataract and refractive surgery expert specializing in LASIK procedures. He is the author of “Lasik: The Eye Laser Miracle”, a widely read book on the subject of laser eye surgery, published by Random House. Caster has been named as one of the “Top Doctors in Los Angeles” by U.S. News & World Report, one of the “Best Doctors in SoCal” by the Los Angeles Times, and the “Best Laser Eye Surgeon in Los Angeles” by Los Angeles (magazine).

Caster has appeared on The Swan (TV series) as himself to perform corrective eye surgery on the show's contestants.

== Biography ==
Caster earned his B.A. from Harvard College in 1976 and his M.D. from Harvard Medical School in 1980. After completing his residency in ophthalmology at the Jules Stein Eye Institute at the UCLA Medical School in 1984, he trained with Dr. Svyatoslav Fyodorov, the Russian innovator of the radial keratotomy procedure in 1987.

Caster is considered a pioneer in the field of Lasik surgery, being one of twenty doctors who got the LASIK procedure approved by the FDA. He is also one of the only four American medical doctors to serve on the Medical Advisory Board of Alcon, which is the world's largest eye care products company.

Caster has served as a clinical instructor of ophthalmology at the UCLA Jules Stein Eye Institute and as a special advisor on the board of the Everychild Foundation.
