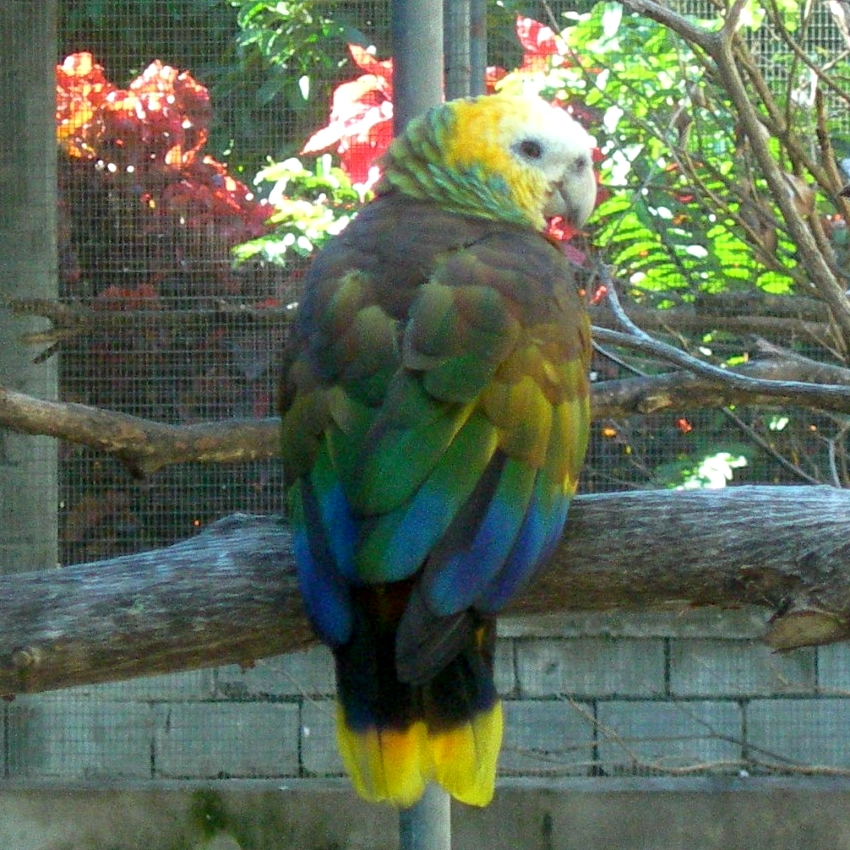
- Specimen at Saint Vincent and the Grenadines Botanic Gardens, Kingstown

Conservation status
- Vulnerable (IUCN 3.1)
- CITES Appendix I

Scientific classification
- Kingdom: Animalia
- Phylum: Chordata
- Class: Aves
- Order: Psittaciformes
- Family: Psittacidae
- Genus: Amazona
- Species: A. guildingii

Binomial name
- Amazona guildingii (Vigors, 1837)

= Saint Vincent amazon =

Species of bird

The Saint Vincent amazon (Amazona guildingii), also known as Saint Vincent parrot, is a large, approximately 40 cm (16 in) long, multi-colored amazon parrot with a yellowish white, blue and green head, greenish-bronze upperparts plumage, and violet blue-green wings.

== Description ==
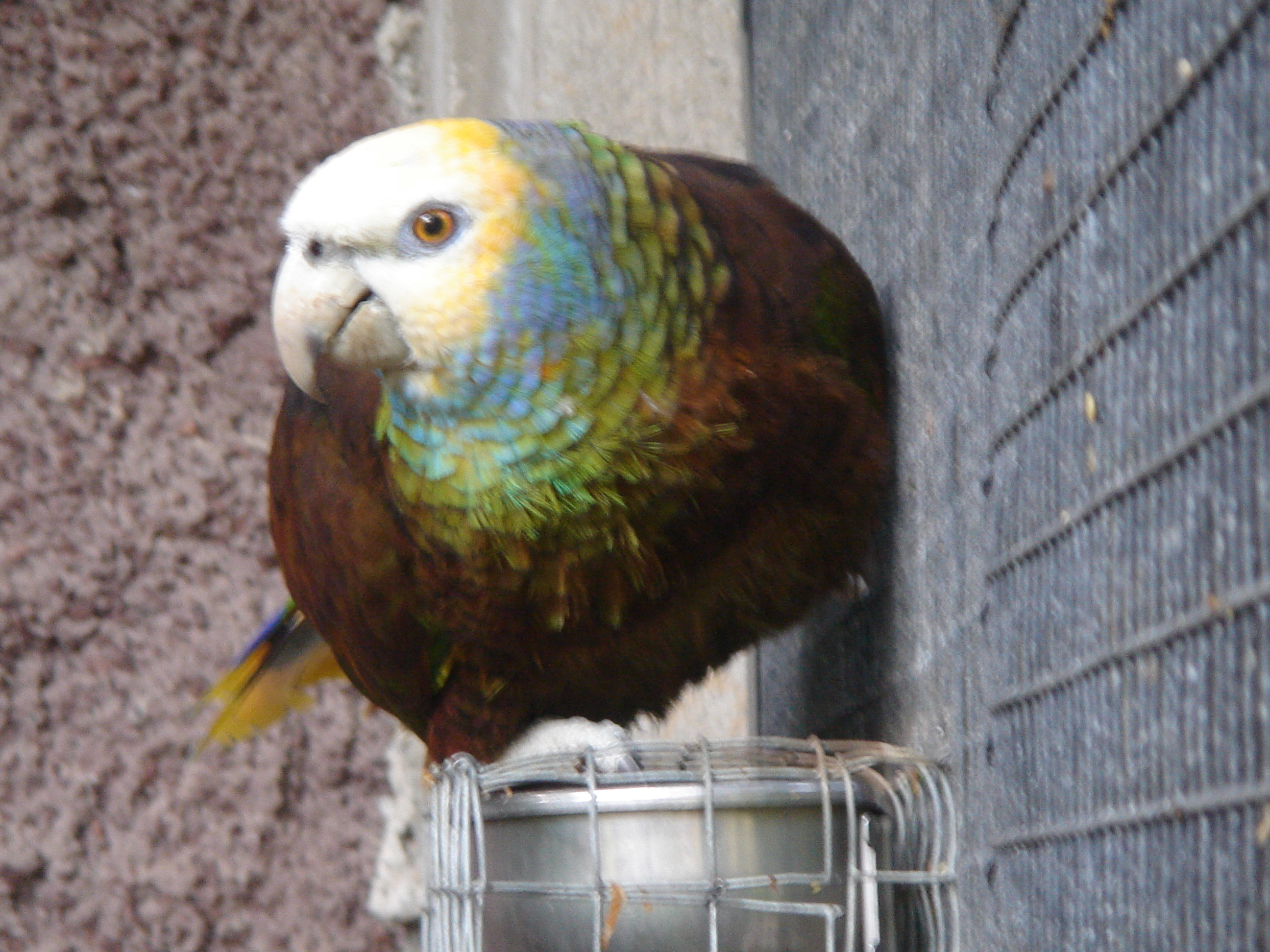
Front view

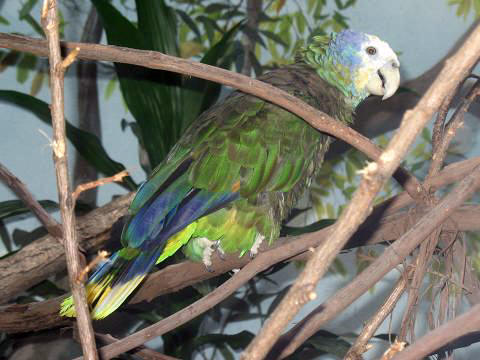
Side view

The bird is a 40 centimetres (16 in) long, mostly green, multi-colored amazon parrot with a yellowish white, blue and green head, greenish-bronze upperparts, grey feet, reddish eye, and violet blue-green wings. Its tail feathers are blue with broad yellow tips. There is a less yellow-brown morph and a less common green morph. Both sexes are similar. The young has lighter plumage and brown iris.

== Range ==
The Saint Vincent amazon is endemic to the heavily forested mountains of the Caribbean island of Saint Vincent in the Lesser Antilles. Its diet consists mainly of fruits, nuts, flowers and seeds. The female usually lays one or two eggs.

== Conservation ==
The Nicholls' Wildlife Aviary Complex, located within the Saint Vincent and the Grenadines Botanic Gardens of Saint Vincent maintains a vital captive breeding and conservation program to conserve the St Vincent Parrot.

== Threats and status ==
Hunting for food, trapping for the cage-bird trade and habitat loss were the principal causes of this species' decline. Deforestation has been the result of forestry activities, the expansion of banana cultivation, charcoal production, the loss of nesting-trees felled by trappers seeking young birds for trade, and natural events such as hurricanes and volcanic eruptions.

The introduced nine-banded armadillo (Dasypus novemcinctus), undermines large trees causing them to topple, reducing the number of suitable nest trees.

A cross-country road is planned, funded by the Taiwanese government, which would destroy large areas of suitable habitat and increase deforestation rates.

The genetic isolation of the separate sub-populations may present further cause for concern.

The small population of captive birds at the Graeme Hall Sanctuary in Barbados is at very high risk. This is due to the lethargy of the Barbados Government in working with the St. Vincent Government and the owner of the Graeme Hall Sanctuary to move the birds to an off-shore island or even back to St. Vincent. Increased raids and poaching at the Sanctuary, the deliberate cutting off of the Sanctuary's water supply, and little or no support from the local Police when raids occur, all mean that this small population is unlikely to survive.

Due to all of these contributing factors, the St. Vincent Parrot is considered Vulnerable on the IUCN Red List of Threatened Species. It is listed on Appendix I of CITES.
