= Robert Liston (diplomat) =

British diplomat (1742–1836)

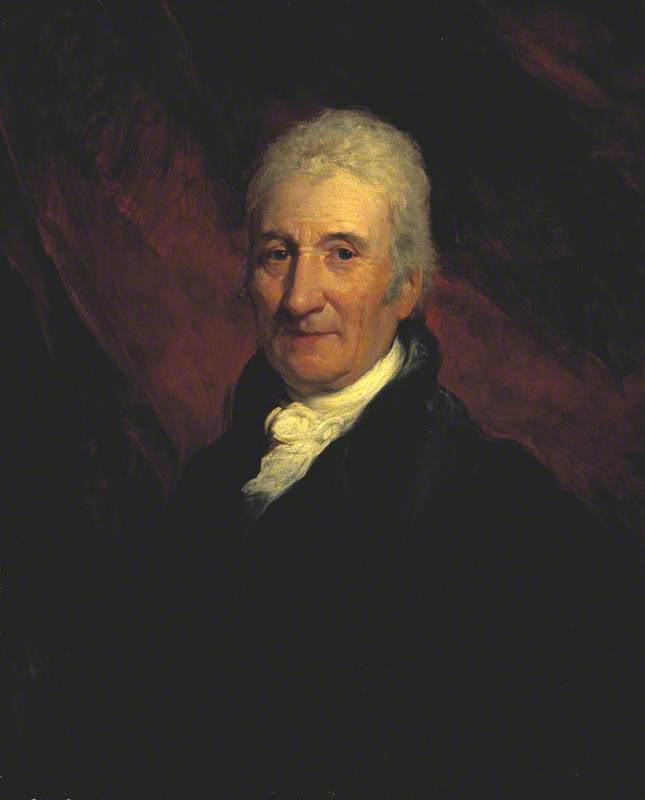
Rt. Hon. Sir Robert Liston

Sir Robert Liston, GCB FRSE PC (8 October 1742 – 15 July 1836) was a Scottish diplomat and ambassador to several countries.

== Biography ==
Liston was born at Overtoun House in Kirkliston, Scotland, the son of Patrick Liston of Torbanehill, West Lothian.

He studied languages at the University of Edinburgh, and then tutored the sons of the Earl of Minto. He was elected a Fellow of the Royal Society of Edinburgh in 1784. His proposers were Andrew Dalzell, William Robertson, and John Drysdale. He was granted an honorary doctorate (LLD) in 1785.

Said to be able to speak ten languages, Liston joined the diplomatic service and enjoyed a career spanning Europe appointed on 22 September 1793, eventually arriving at Constantinople on 19 May 1794. He hated it there and left on 4 November 1795.

In a promotion he was posted to the United States. In 1796 he married the heiress Henrietta Marchant of Antigua. Henrietta's charm and social tact were a great asset to her husband; she also kept an interesting diary in which she records favourable impressions of George Washington and John Adams, and an unfavourable impression of Talleyrand. Robert was also on excellent terms with Washington, though relations cooled somewhat after Adams' election.

On 26 March 1812 he was sworn a Privy Councillor, and on 21 October 1816, he was awarded the Grand Cross of the Bath. He served for a second time as ambassador to the Sublime Porte from 1812, finally retiring from the post in 1820.

The family lived at Millburn Tower in Ratho. Liston's wife, Henrietta Marchant, died in 1828 and he died at home in 1836. They had no children.

He and his wife are buried in the graveyard of Gogar Kirk. Liston had bought the kirk and burial ground and built a family mausoleum at the site. However, when the kirk was rebuilt in 1890, as there were no descendants to save it, the mausoleum was demolished. It was replaced with a memorial obelisk.

== Timeline of career ==
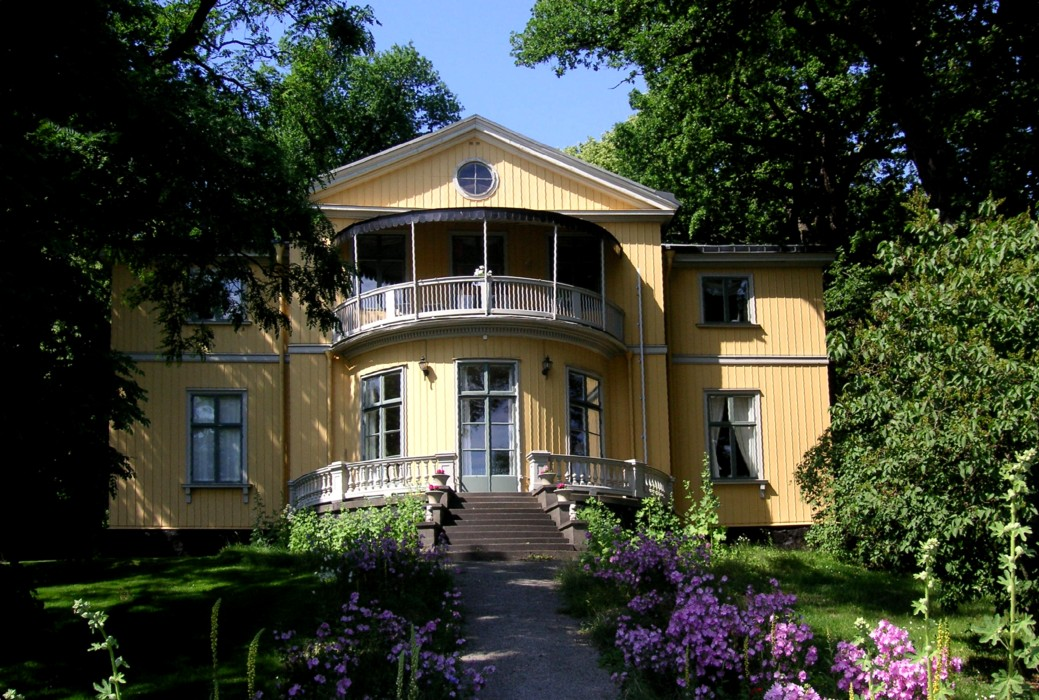
Listonhill, Robert Liston's residence in Stockholm.

- Secretary of Embassy to the King of Spain (12 March 1783)
- Minister plenipotentiary to Spain (1784)
- Ambassador to Sweden (1788–1793)
- Ambassador to the Ottoman Empire (1 October 1793 – 1796)
- Envoy extraordinary and minister plenipotentiary to the United States (10 March 1796 – 1800)
- Envoy extraordinary and minister plenipotentiary to the Batavian republic (14 August 1802)
- Extraordinary mission to the King of Denmark (23 June 1803)
- Ambassador to the Ottoman Empire (2 March 1812 - 1820)

== See also ==
- List of Ambassadors from the United Kingdom to the United States
- List of diplomats of the United Kingdom to the Ottoman Empire

Diplomatic posts
| Preceded by George Hammond | British Minister to the United States; 1796 – 1800 | Succeeded by Anthony Merry |
