= Wernerian Natural History Society =

Learned society in Scotland (1808–58)

The Wernerian Natural History Society (12 January 1808 – 16 April 1858), commonly abbreviated as the Wernerian Society, was a learned society interested in the broad field of natural history, and saw papers presented on various topics such as mineralogy, plants, insects, and scholarly expeditions. The Society was an offshoot of the Royal Society of Edinburgh, and from its beginnings it was a rather elite organization.

The Society was named after Abraham Gottlob Werner, a German geologist who was a creator of Neptunism, a theory of superposition based on a receding primordial ocean that had deposited all the rocks in the crust. At this time all rocks, including basalt, and crystalline substances were thought by some to be precipitated from solution.

== History ==
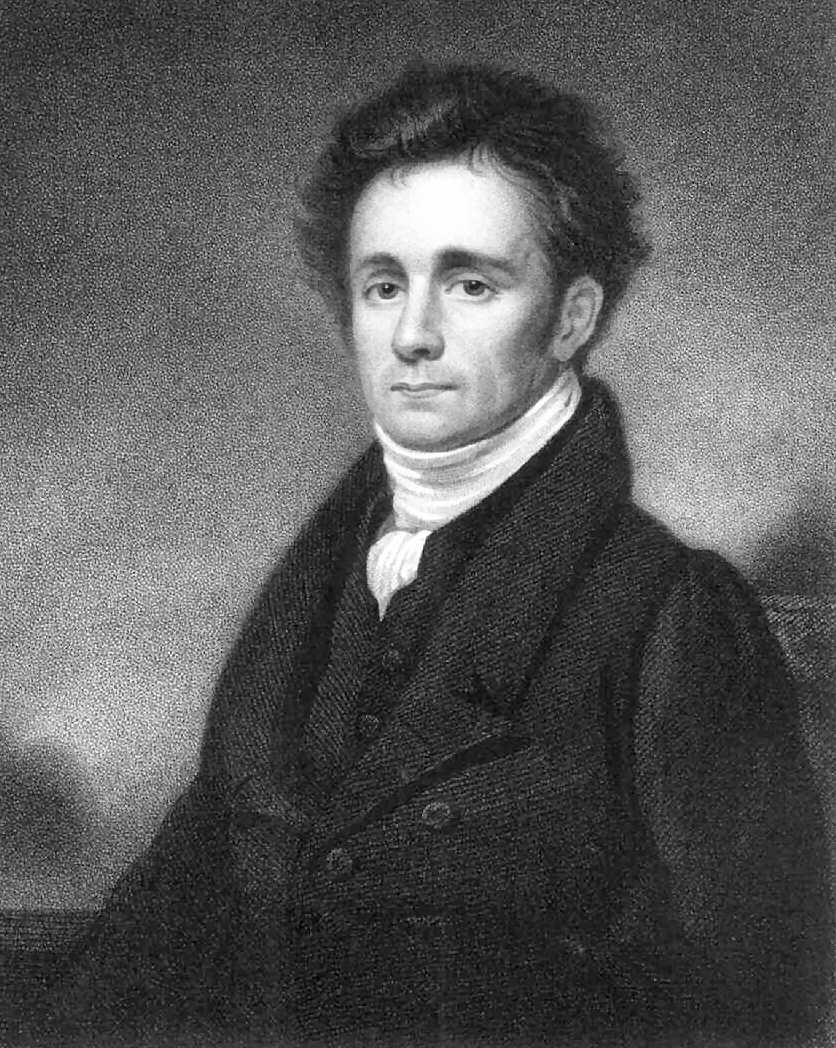
Robert Jameson, founder and life president of the Wernerian Society.

Robert Jameson, Regius Professor of Natural History at the University of Edinburgh, was the founder and life president of the Society. In 1800, he spent a year at the mining academy in Freiberg, Saxony, where he studied under Werner. The Society was founded on 12 January 1808, and the first meeting of the Society occurred on 2 March 1808. Between 1811 and 1839 eight volumes of Memoirs of the Wernerian Natural History Society appeared. More than twelve of Jameson's papers on geology and mineralogy were published in these volumes, and he also contributed some on zoology and botany. Proceedings after 1839 were published in Jameson's Edinburgh New Philosophical Journal. The Society hosted many of the notable scientists of its day.

== Decline ==
There were no meetings from 1850–1856, which coincided with the decline of Jameson himself. It was eventually decided to close the Society down and dispose of its assets, and it finally closed on 16 April 1858.

== Letters ==
Members of the Wernerian Society were entitled to use the abbreviation M.W.S. after their name. "Corresponding members", based outside Edinburgh, used the designation C.M.W.S.

== Notable members ==
=== Founding members ===
Founding members, as of 12 January 1808:

Honorary

- Abraham Gottlob Werner
- Sir Joseph Banks, President, Royal Society
- Richard Kirwan, President, Royal Irish Academy

Resident

- Robert Jameson, F.R.S.Edin., Professor of Natural History, University of Edinburgh
- William Wright, M.D., F.R.S.S. (London and Edinburgh), A.L.S.
- Thomas Macknight, D.D., F.R.S.Edin.
- John Barclay, M.D., F.R.S.Edin., Lecturer in Anatomy
- Thomas Thomson, M.D., F.R.S.Edin.
- Col. Stewart Murray Fullerton (a.k.a. Fullarton)
- Charles Anderson, M.D., F.R.C.S.Edin., Surgeon, of Leith
- Patrick Walker, Esq., F.L.S.
- Patrick Neill, A.M., A.L.S. (Secretary 1808-1849)

=== Other members ===
- John Hutton Balfour, Regius Keeper of the Royal Botanic Garden Edinburgh
- Sir Charles Bell, surgeon, anatomist, neurologist and philosophical theologian; authority on the human nervous system
- William Borrer, botanist
- Robert Brown, botanist and palaeobotanist, the first observer of Brownian motion
- William Bullock an English traveller, naturalist and antiquarian.
- Edward Donovan Anglo Irish writer, natural history illustrator and zoologist.
- James Duncan (Zoologist), Entomologist.
- John Goodsir, anatomist, pioneer of cell biology
- Robert Graham, botanist
- Robert Knox, surgeon, anatomist and zoologist, whose career was ruined by his involvement in the Burke and Hare case
- King Leopold I of Belgium
- William Lochead, surgeon and superintendent of the Saint Vincent Botanical Garden
- William MacGillivray, naturalist and ornithologist who worked with Audubon
- Sir James McGrigor, physician, military surgeon and botanist who founded the Royal Army Medical Corps
- Joseph Mitchell, civil engineer
- Samuel Mitchill, physician, naturalist and member of the U.S. House of Representatives and Senate
- Friedrich Mohs, geologist and mineralogist who devised Mohs scale of physical hardness
- Alexander Monro, tertius, surgeon and anatomist who taught Darwin
- Sir William Edward Parry, Arctic explorer
- Marc-Auguste Pictet, physicist and meteorologist
- James Cowles Prichard, ethnologist and physician
- William Scoresby, whaler, Arctic explorer, and clergyman
- Robert Stevenson, lighthouse engineer
- Thomas Stewart Traill, physician, natural historian and scholar of medical jurisprudence
- James Watt, pioneer of the industrial revolution
- William Hyde Wollaston, physicist, chemist and physiologist who discovered Rhodium and Palladium
