= Joseph Forsyth Johnson =

English landscape architect (1840–1906)

- Born: 1840; England
- Died: 17 July 1906 (aged 65–66); Brooklyn, New York, U.S.
- Occupation: Architect
- Projects: Latta Park; Cloverdale; Inman Park; Piedmont Park

Joseph Forsyth Johnson (1840 – 17 July 1906) was an English landscape architect and disciple of John Ruskin. He "played a pivotal role in introducing the notion of naturalistic planting."

== Early life ==
Johnson was English and was possibly born near Liverpool. His Scottish maternal grandfather John Forsyth was a florist. His great-grandfather was William Forsyth, a botanist who co-founded the Royal Horticultural Society in 1804.

== Career ==
Johnson worked for the Manchester Botanical Garden as a flower arranger in 1867. He had a successful career designing the grounds for several large houses in England, Ireland, and Russia. In 1868, he became the curator of the Royal Botanic Gardens in Belfast, Ireland. While there, he oversaw the Horticultural Exhibition in 1874. In January 1877, he announced that he had left his position with the Royal Botanic Gardens and was seeking positions as a landscape gardener or in the improvement of landed property.

In the late 1870s and early 1880s, he worked for the Alexandra Palace near London, as the director of horticultural exhibits.

He was a horticultural judge for the Amsterdam International Exhibition in 1877, the Paris Exhibition in 1879, and the Brussels Exhibition in 1880. In 1882, he arranged the Lord Mayor's Rose Show at Mansion House.

He subsequently set up a landscape gardening shop at 90 Bond Street in London around 1883. He advertised "competent gardeners and workmen sent to all parts."

After relocating to the United States in 1885, Johnson eventually established a practice in New York City from which he oversaw numerous East Coast projects, from Maine to Florida. He was a fellow of the Royal Horticultural Society.

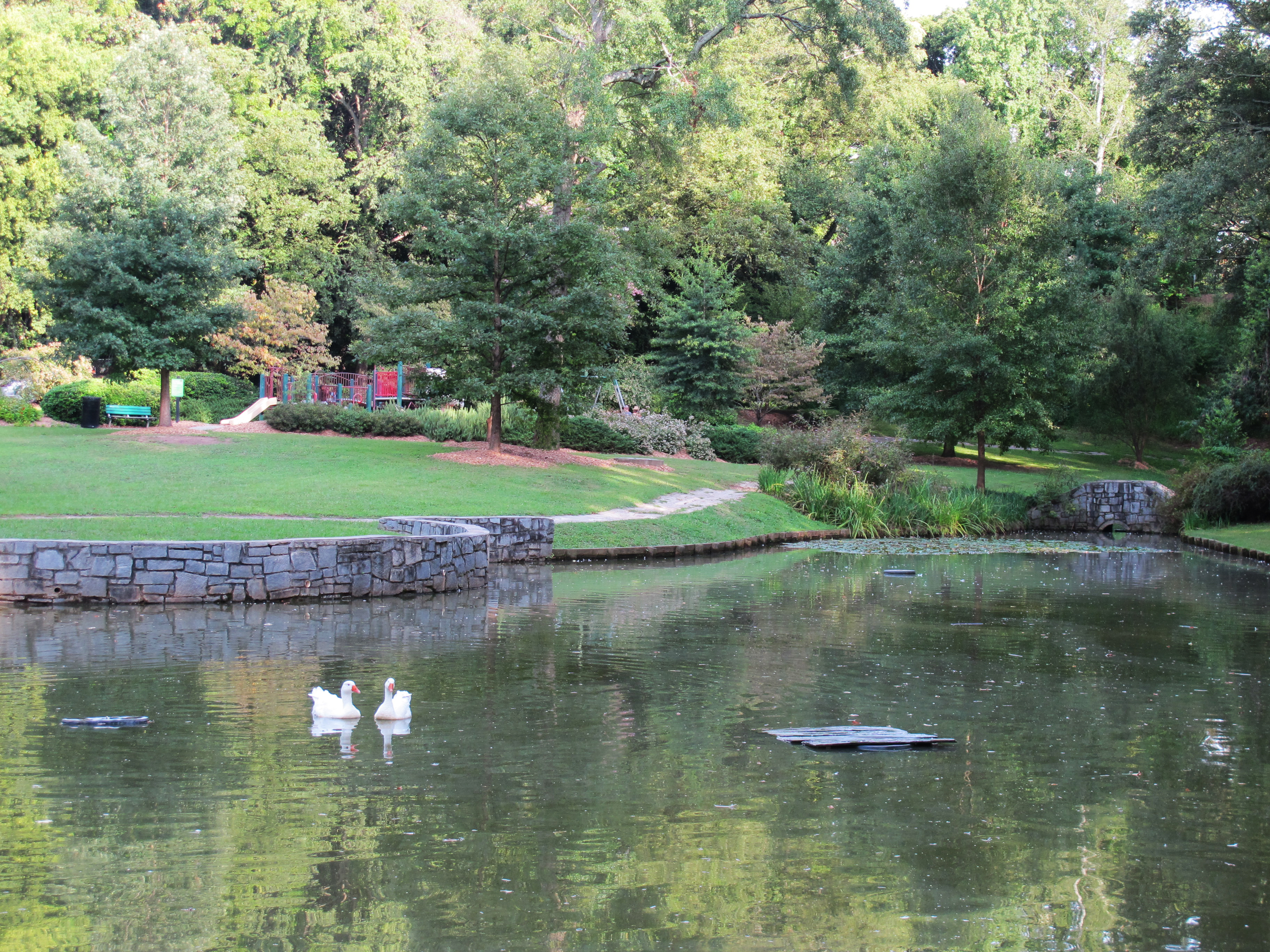
Inman Park

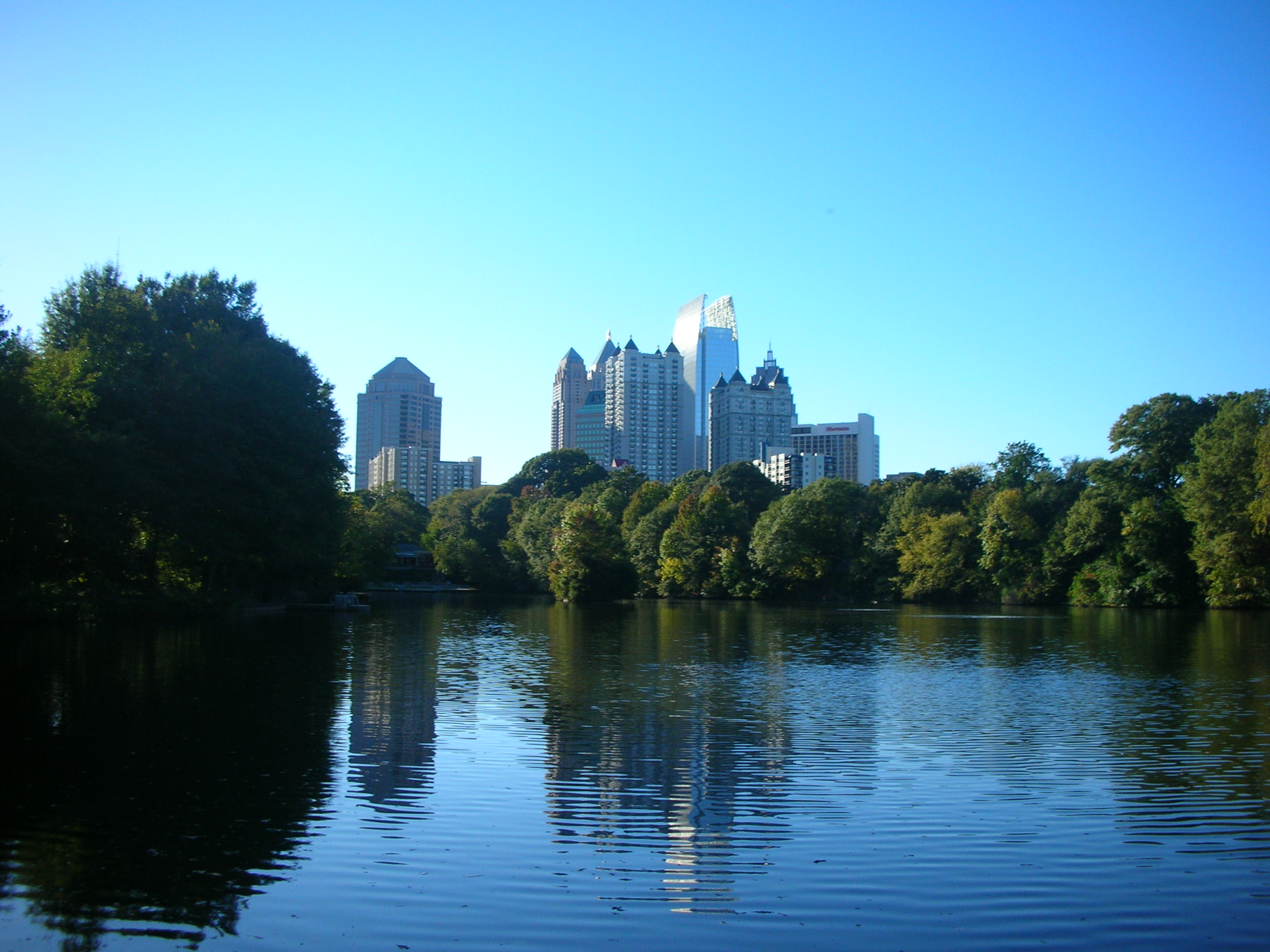
Piedmont Park

=== Prospect Park ===
He went to the United States in 1885, where he was employed by Prospect Park in Brooklyn, New York as superintendent of horticulture. The park was overgrown, and he planned to create several vistas so the entirety of the large park would be visible. This would have necessitated the removal of a large number of trees, which proved unacceptable to the community. As a result, Johnson was terminated from the project.

=== Inman Park ===
A recommendation in 1887 by New York florist Peter Henderson convinced Joel Hurt to bring Johnson to Atlanta to work on his streetcar suburb, Inman Park. Johnson's design for the 130 acres of Atlanta's first suburb included winding streets, open spaces, and parks inspired by Frederick Law Olmsted.

=== Piedmont Park ===
Johnson joined Hurt again for Piedmont Park, the site of the Cotton States and International Exposition, a world's fair that was held in Atlanta, Georgia.

=== Latta Park ===
In 1891, he designed Latta Park in Charlotte, North Carolina. The park featured two large pavilions, pleasure drives, ponds, and a grove of shade trees. Latta Park remains today but is smaller in size.

=== Cloverdale ===
In 1892, he may have designed the neighborhood of Cloverdale in Montgomery, Alabama.

=== Cumberland ===
In June 1906, Johnson was hired by the Real Estate and Securities Co. to design a building park in Cumberland, Maryland. The park was located at the intersection of Green Street and Fayette Street.

== Publications ==
- The Natural Principle of Landscape Gardening: Or the Adornment of Land for Perpetual Beauty. Belfast: Archer and Songs, 1874
- Residential Sites and Environments, Their Conveniences, Gardens, Parks and Planting. New York: A.T. Delamare, 1898
- "The Laws of Developing Landscape, Showing How to Make Thickets and Woodlands Reveal Their Natural Beauty," Journal of the Royal Horticultural Society 29 (1904–1905): 595–624

== Personal life ==
Johnson married Elizabeth Trowsdale (born 1832) on 12 January 1861. She was a housekeeper at Gilling Castle in Yorkshire. They had six children: John Forsyth Johnson (born 1861), Charles (born 1862), Georgiana Mary Alice (born 1864), Elizabeth (born 1868), Joseph and Christina (born 1873).

He moved to America in 1885 with Frances Clarke, a 26-year-old linen draper's assistant who was included on the ship's passenger list as his wife. They had three children.

Johnson's great-grandson by his first marriage was the British entertainer Sir Bruce Forsyth (1928–2017). Forsyth appeared on the BBC One genealogy television show Who Do You Think You Are? researching his great-grandfather Joseph, in particular any information relating to his American family. Despite the question of bigamy arising in this documentary, there is no record for Johnson's marriage to Frances Clarke, although she is shown to have been recorded as both Frances Clarke Johnson and Frances Forsyth Johnson.

Johnson's American family was informed that he had died while traveling to Great Britain and had been buried at sea. In fact, he had abandoned his American family just as he had previously abandoned his English wife and children. In reality, he returned to England to visit his family there, later going between England and the United States several times over the next few years.

He was a Mason, having been a charter member of the Epping Lodge and a member and officer of the F. and A. M. in London.

In 1906, Johnson died at the Brooklyn Hospital in Brooklyn, New York at the age of 67. He was buried at Evergreen Cemetery in Brooklyn with Masonic honors. He died with only $389 to his name after living for several years in a hotel, leaving no last will or testament.

After visiting his great-grandfather's unmarked grave at Evergreens Cemetery, Sir Bruce Forsyth commissioned a headstone for Johnson's grave.
