= William Lochead =

Scottish surgeon and botanist

William Lochead FRSE MWS (sometimes given as Lochhead; c.1753-1815) was a Scottish surgeon and botanist. He served as the curator of the Saint Vincent and the Grenadines Botanic Gardens in the West Indies from 1811 to 1815, succeeding his friend Alexander Anderson.

== Life ==
The son of John Lochead, William was born in Paisley in central Scotland around 1753. He graduated MD from the University of Glasgow in 1775 and served as a surgeon in Antigua in the West Indies.

In 1791 he was elected a Fellow of the Royal Society of Edinburgh. His proposers were John Walker, William Wright and Daniel Rutherford.

In 1794 he wrote extensively to Rev Dr John Walker concerning Guiana and the island of Demerara.

He died at St Vincent on 22 March 1815. His post in the Gardens was succeeded by George Caley.
