= Didn't They Do Well =

British quiz show

- Presented by: Bruce Forsyth
- Country of origin: United Kingdom
- Original language: English
- No. of series: 1
- No. of episodes: 10

Original release
- Network: BBC1
- Release: 15 January – 18 March 2004

Didn't They Do Well was a short-lived BBC television quiz show presented by Bruce Forsyth that ran from 15 January to 18 March 2004. It consisted of archive television clips, many of which were from previous quiz show episodes, in which modern day contestants were shown a question and then asked to answer it. Its title was one of Forsyth's catchphrases when hosting The Generation Game in the 1970s and again in the 1990s.

== List of quizmasters shown ==
- Magnus Magnusson
- Bob Monkhouse
- Bob Mortimer
- Jeremy Paxman
- Vic Reeves
- Anne Robinson
- Jimmy Tarbuck
