= Saint Vincent and the Grenadines Botanic Gardens =

Botanic garden in Kingstown, Saint Vincent

Coordinates: 13°9.95′N 61°13.625′W

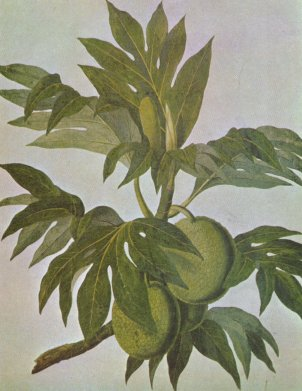
Drawing of breadfruit by Sydney Parkinson

The Saint Vincent and the Grenadines Botanic Gardens is located in Kingstown, Saint Vincent and the Grenadines. Established in 1765, it is the oldest botanic garden in the Western Hemisphere. It is one of the most visited sites in Saint Vincent and the Grenadines. A historic landmark of major national, regional and global significance, it currently occupies approximately 8 hectares (20 acres).

== History ==
=== Establishment ===
If it ever existed, the garden's royal charter has neither survived nor yet been rediscovered. However, letters exchanged between General Robert Melville and the island surgeon botanist Dr George Young show that island commissioners were on 15 December 1765 directed to lay aside six acres of land as part of a 'steady plan' to facilitate botanical discoveries and encourage the cultivating of nutritional, medicinal and commercial 'improvements' for Saint Vincent's population. Accounts compiled later by Young's successor Dr Alexander Anderson are more detailed, affirming that the garden was created to facilitate the '[introduction of such] plants as might be of advantage' to the British West Indies and the 'nation at large'; namely in the provision of new 'foods, medicines or batches of commerce' that could not be cultivated in Britain's North American colonies.

The function of the garden therefore appears to have been congruous with the establishment of other eighteenth-century Caribbean Gardens at Bath and Liguanea in Jamaica, where superintendents were asked to 'explore indigenous plants, ascertain their values and uses', 'do the same with exotic plants', and import seeds that would 'prove beneficial to Britain'. In following the broader colonial programme of 'plant interchange', the Saint Vincent Botanic Garden was designed to cultivate new West Indian export markets by way of introducing foreign plant species from the East. Though a 'premium' had been offered by the Royal Society in 1760 for the cultivation of useful plant species, there is no evidence that Melville ever claimed a reward for the Botanic Garden.

Unlike other colonial projects, the garden did not attract government funding from Britain. Instead, documents indicate it was privately financed by Melville during his tenure in the Windward Isles, and Anderson's 'Account' shows he directed the commanding officer at the Kingstown Garrison to requisition a plot of barrack land for the garden. He then established a correspondence with governors on the Spanish Main 'to bring more valuable plants of that country' to Saint Vincent, and left Dr. Young '[with his] library relating to botanical history', 'other handbooks of science', and 'all his mathematical instruments'. According to a letter dated 20 July 1766, Melville also arranged for cinnamon seeds to be sent to Doctor Young from the French Island of Guadeloupe, and by 1773 the garden contained 52 plant species.

=== Expansion and development ===
Surviving plant catalogues – of which there are five – provide a quantitative account of the garden's expansion from 1765. These documents show a twenty-fivefold increase in the number of plants when classified by genus until the early nineteenth century; 52 in 1773, 769 in 1792, 796 in 1793, and 1,311 by 1806. Classed according to the floristic kingdoms from which they originated, the garden's botanists acquired plants from three of the world's six photochoria; approximately twelve per cent from Holocratic North America and Europe; forty-one per cent from Neotropical Central and South America, and forty-seven per cent from the Palaeotropical regions of South-East Asia, the Indian subcontinent and Africa.

Given the paucity of government funding and logistical support provided for the garden, many of these plant species were sent by French botanists working from Saint Domingue, Martinique, Guadeloupe and Cayenne. Notable participants in this network of plant exchange included the marquis de Bouillé François Claude Amour du Chariol, Governor General of the French Antilles from 1777 to 1783, and Jean-Baptiste Victor Hugues, Governor of Guadeloupe from 1794 to 1795 and French Guiana from 1802 to 1809.

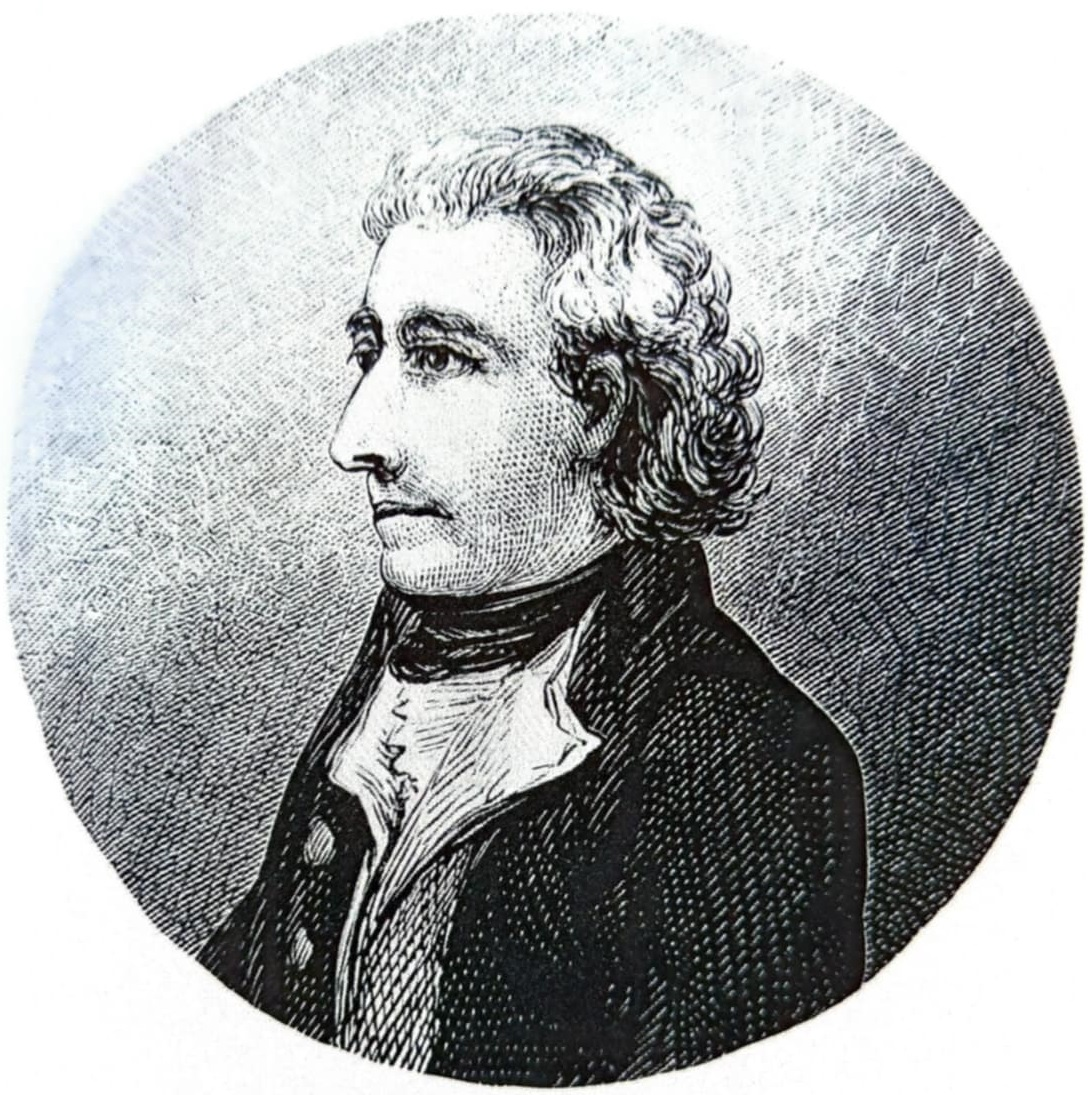
Alexander Anderson, Scottish botanist who served as the Botanic Gardens curator from 1785 to 1811

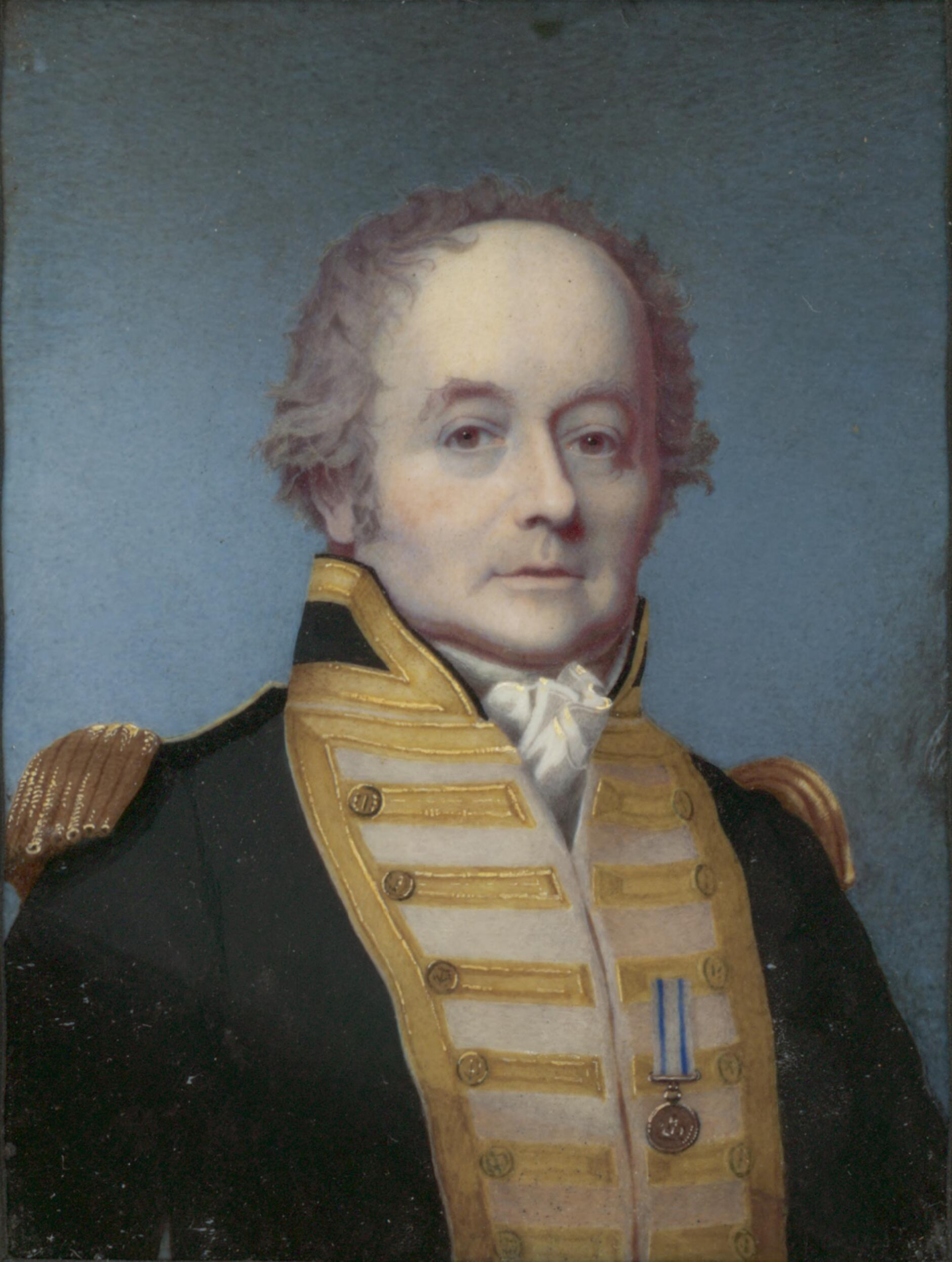
Captain William Bligh, 1814, who introduced breadfruit to the West Indies

Following the Peace of Paris in (1763) the newly appointed governor of the southern British Caribbean islands, Robert Melville, and the military surgeon in Saint Vincent, George Young, decided to create a botanic garden, primarily to provide medicinal plants for the military and improve the life and economy of the colony. Eighteenth-century botanists placed great emphasis on introducing valuable and commercial plants from the East Indies to Kew Gardens in England to be sent later to the American tropics. The Royal Society fostered the introduction, establishment, and dissemination of highly prized species.

Melville, anticipating modern ethnobotany, urged that "physical practitioners of the country, natives of experience, and even old Caribs and slaves who have dealt in cures might be worth taking notice of, and if at any time you should think that a secret may be got at or even an improvement for small expense, I shall readily pay for it." The War Department (UK) and the Honourable East India Company sent seeds and plants from tropical India and from British North Borneo, Sabah, and Sarawak in the East Indies. Other species came from French and Caribbean sources, such as cinnamon from Guadeloupe and Grenada. From Kew Gardens came seeds from China.

Under George Young (1765–1785), and the capable and enthusiastic guidance of the second superintendent curator, Alexander Anderson, who served from 1785 to 1811, the Botanical Gardens quickly attained an enviable reputation and received wide acclaim. The garden attracted talented successor curators, including William Lochead, George Caley, Henry Powell, and William Sands.

A third-generation clone of a breadfruit tree in the twenty-first century collection of the gardens came from an original plant brought in 1793 by Captain William Bligh (of Bounty fame). In 1787–88 Captain Bligh made his ill-fated voyage on HMS Bounty to Tahiti to collect breadfruit and other useful plants for the West Indies. Undaunted by the notorious mutiny of his first crew, Bligh again set sail for Tahiti aboard HMS Providence. He completed his mission in Kingstown, Saint Vincent on January 23, 1793, with plants from the South Seas. The Botanic Garden's curator Alexander Anderson took great care of these plants, and the success of all those efforts is evident from the widespread distribution of breadfruit, the most useful food plant throughout the West Indies.

The first half of the nineteenth century was a lean time for colonial botanic gardens. By 1850, due to a lack of interest and maintenance, the Saint Vincent gardens had fallen into disrepair. Local efforts in Saint Vincent initiated in 1884 began to revive the gardens; by 1890 the work was reactivated as part of a larger agricultural and botanical scheme.

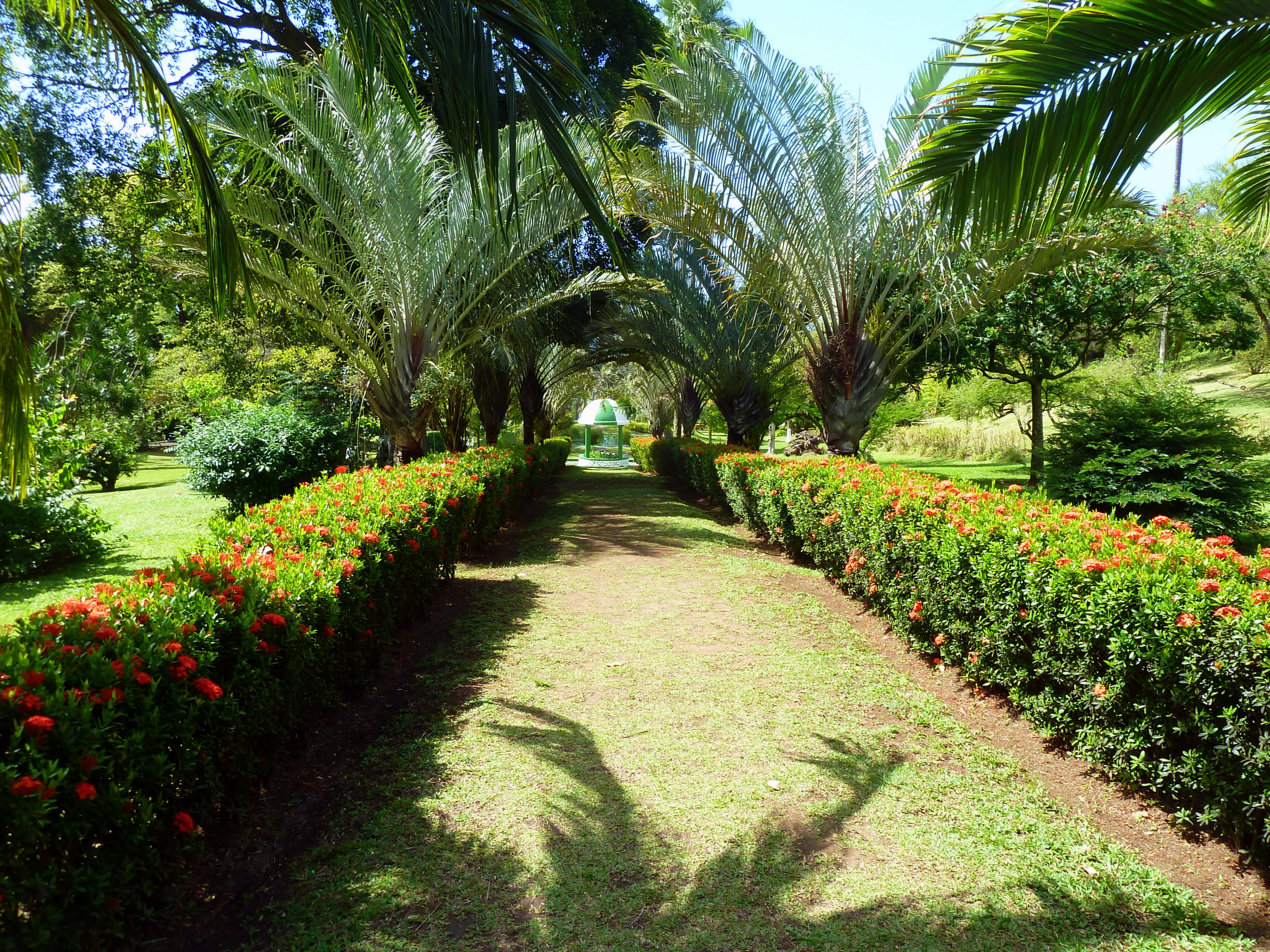
Garden vista

The Botanical Gardens soon regained their former glory and beauty, and the plant collections were recovered. Considerable attention was given to experimental work in the gardens on economic crops until 1944 (cotton, arrowroot, cacao and sugarcane). The layout of the re-established gardens was improved by the construction of a small Doric Temple, by road building and by the continuous introduction of plants to maintain and add to the collection.

== Conservation programs ==
Several members of the British royal family have planted a tree in the garden, where pink poui (Tabebuia rosea) was planted by Prince Edward, Earl of Wessex, on 27 February 2012, and a baobab (Adansonia digitata) tree was planted by Prince Harry, Duke of Sussex, on 28 November 2016.

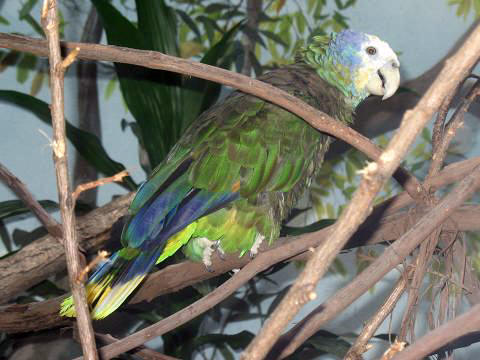
Saint Vincent amazon

The Nicholas Wildlife Aviary Complex, located within the gardens, maintains a captive breeding program to conserve the vulnerable Saint Vincent amazon, the national bird. These endemic parrots can be found in the wild and also in the aviary.

The gardens have been designated an Important Bird Area (IBA) by BirdLife International because they support significant populations of local birds, including lesser Antillean swifts, purple-throated and green-throated caribs, Antillean crested hummingbirds, Caribbean elaenias, Grenada flycatchers, Saint Vincent tanagers and lesser Antillean bullfinches.

== See also ==
- Herbalism
- Botánica
- Botanical gardens
- Plant collecting
- List of botanical gardens
- Andromeda Gardens
