= These Are My Favourites =

Studio album by Bruce Forsyth
- Released: 7 November 2011
- Genre: Jazz
- Length: 37:10
- Label: EMI

Bruce Forsyth chronology
Mr. Entertainment (2007)	These Are My Favourites (2011)

These Are My Favourites is the fourth and final studio album released by the English television personality Bruce Forsyth. The album was released on 7 November 2011 through EMI Records. It peaked at number 58 on the UK Albums Chart.

== Track listing ==
No.	Title	Length
1.	"Almost Like Being in Love"	2:02
2.	"Young and Foolish"	3:03
3.	"Give Me the Simple Life"	2:43
4.	"Let There Be Love"	2:38
5.	"I've Grown Accustomed To Her Face"	3:20
6.	"A Shine On Your Shoes"	2:10
7.	"Paper Moon" (feat. Nat King Cole)	2:21
8.	"Emily"	3:05
9.	"Smile" (feat. Sophie Purdie)	3:24
10.	"Night and Day"	3:10
11.	"There'll Never Be Another You"	2:31
12.	"Can't Take My Eyes Off You"	3:43
13.	"I Made It Through the Rain"	3:00

== Chart performance ==
Chart (2011)	Peak position
UK Albums Chart	58

== Release history ==
Country	Date	Format	Label
United Kingdom	7 November 2011	CD	EMI
