= Cloverdale, Montgomery =

Neighborhood in Montgomery, Alabama, US

Cloverdale is a neighborhood within the American city of Montgomery, Alabama. It is the largest garden-landscaped neighborhood in the state of Alabama. Built in the late nineteenth and early twentieth centuries, it is one of Montgomery's "genteel" areas. The term serves two purposes: the "original" Cloverdale area, and the larger area, which includes other historic neighborhoods such as Cloverdale-Idlewild.

== History ==
Purchased by William Graham in 1817, Cloverdale rests in a portion of the original 160-acre (0.65 km^{2}) lot. This area of land was originally called "Graham's Woods" because of its thick growth and distance from the city of Montgomery. The landscape was covered with virgin pines, a few of which still exist on the lawns of some Cloverdale homes. Consequently, this area was sometimes called "The Pines" in addition to the name "Graham's Woods". In addition to the pine trees, there were also a number of open glens where clover grew in abundance, and this seems to be the likely origin of the name, Cloverdale, which was adopted in 1892.

The picturesque natural garden landscape developed in Europe during the early 19th century and was popularized during the mid-century in America by landscape architect Frederick Law Olmsted. Olmsted was America's preeminent landscape architect and responsible for a number of nineteenth century residential suburbs, including Riverside (1869) in Chicago and Druid Hills (1893) in Atlanta, Georgia.

The plan for Cloverdale has basic qualities which are similar to Olmsted's suburban residential designs elsewhere around the country. Olmsted was at work on the landscape plan for the Alabama State Capitol grounds in Montgomery in 1889, contemporary with the early development of Cloverdale. No documentation, however, has yet surfaced to substantiate any definite Olmsted influence.

A more likely designer of Cloverdale was the English landscape architect Joseph Forsyth Johnson, who emigrated to America in the 1870s after a successful career designing the grounds for a number of estates in England, Ireland and Russia. A comparison of Cloverdale with Johnson's design for the residential suburb Inman Park in Atlanta reveals some remarkable similarities. Both, for example, had proposed lake sites and both have long, narrow, central park areas surrounded by curving streets.

The earliest documentation discovered for the construction of a house in Cloverdale is from a letter dated 1892. This house, which was located on the corner of what is now Felder Avenue and Norman Bridge Road, was demolished for an apartment complex in the late 1940s.

In 1893, The Cloverdale Land and Development Company was bankrupt, due to the nationwide economic panic of that period. During the next fifteen years, the Cloverdale site lay dormant with the exception of some activity along the north side of Felder Avenue, where a small golf course and tennis courts were built, the beginning of the Montgomery Country Club.

In 1908, there were only ten houses in Cloverdale, but by 1916 there were one hundred twenty-five. Many of these homes were designed by Montgomery's leading architects, B. B. Smith, Weatherly Carter, Frank Lockwood Sr., and Frank Lockwood Jr. One house was designed by Mobile architect Nicholas Holmes Sr.

In 1910, the residents of Cloverdale voted for the first time to incorporate their suburb into a self-governing village. They elected Charles Tullis as the first mayor. This period also saw the development of a small commercial strip on the corner of Norman Bridge Road and the north side of Cloverdale Road, and this became Montgomery's first suburban commercial area. In the late 1920s, another similar business strip began to develop on the corner of Fairview Avenue and Woodley Road.

Cloverdale has been one of Montgomery's choice residential areas since the turn of the century. It is one of Montgomery's earliest suburbs and is the oldest landscape garden designed residential area in Alabama, predating similar areas in Birmingham. Its short existence as an incorporated village (1910–1927) gave it a special sense of neighborhood, which it has retained to some degree to the present day.

== Old Cloverdale Historic District ==
The original landscaped area of Cloverdale is now known as Old Cloverdale. Old Cloverdale is between Felder Avenue and East Fairview Avenue from the north & south, and between Norman Bridge Road from the west and College Street, Watson Avenue & College Court from the east. Areas outside of these boundaries are not inside the Old Cloverdale Historic District; parts of some surrounding neighborhoods such as the Garden District, Edgewood, and Cloverdale-Idlewild are part of what some generically call the "Cloverdale" area of Montgomery.

The neighborhood of Old Cloverdale became an official historic district on December 17, 1996. This helps to maintain and protect the charm, look, and character of the neighborhood.

Old Cloverdale is home to Cloverdale Park, Mary Ann Neely Park, Fitzgerald Park, LeGrande Park, and Milo Howard Park.

== Demographics ==
Historical population
Census	Pop.	Note	%±
1920	537		—
U.S. Decennial Census

Cloverdale was listed as an incorporated town on the 1920 U.S. Census with a population of 537. It would be annexed by the city of Montgomery in 1927.

== Points of interest ==
- Huntingdon College
