= George Young (surgeon and botanist) =

George Young (died 1803) was a British military surgeon and botanist who served as the first superintendent of the botanic gardens in Kingstown, Saint Vincent and the Grenadines. The naturalist John Ellis, in his book Some Additional Observations on the Method of Preserving Seeds from Foreign Parts (London, 1773) described Young as "principal surgeon to the [St. Vincent military] hospital, whose indefatigable zeal in collecting and propagating a variety of the most valuable plants, is known to all the curious botanists about London." Young's noteworthy efforts in cultivating a variety of tropical plants important for the economy of the British colonies was recognized by the Royal Society of Arts in 1774, which awarded him a gold medal for his work. Named as one of the pupils of the botanist John Hope in the later's entry in the ODNB.
