= William Forsyth (horticulturist) =

Scottish botanist (1737–1804)

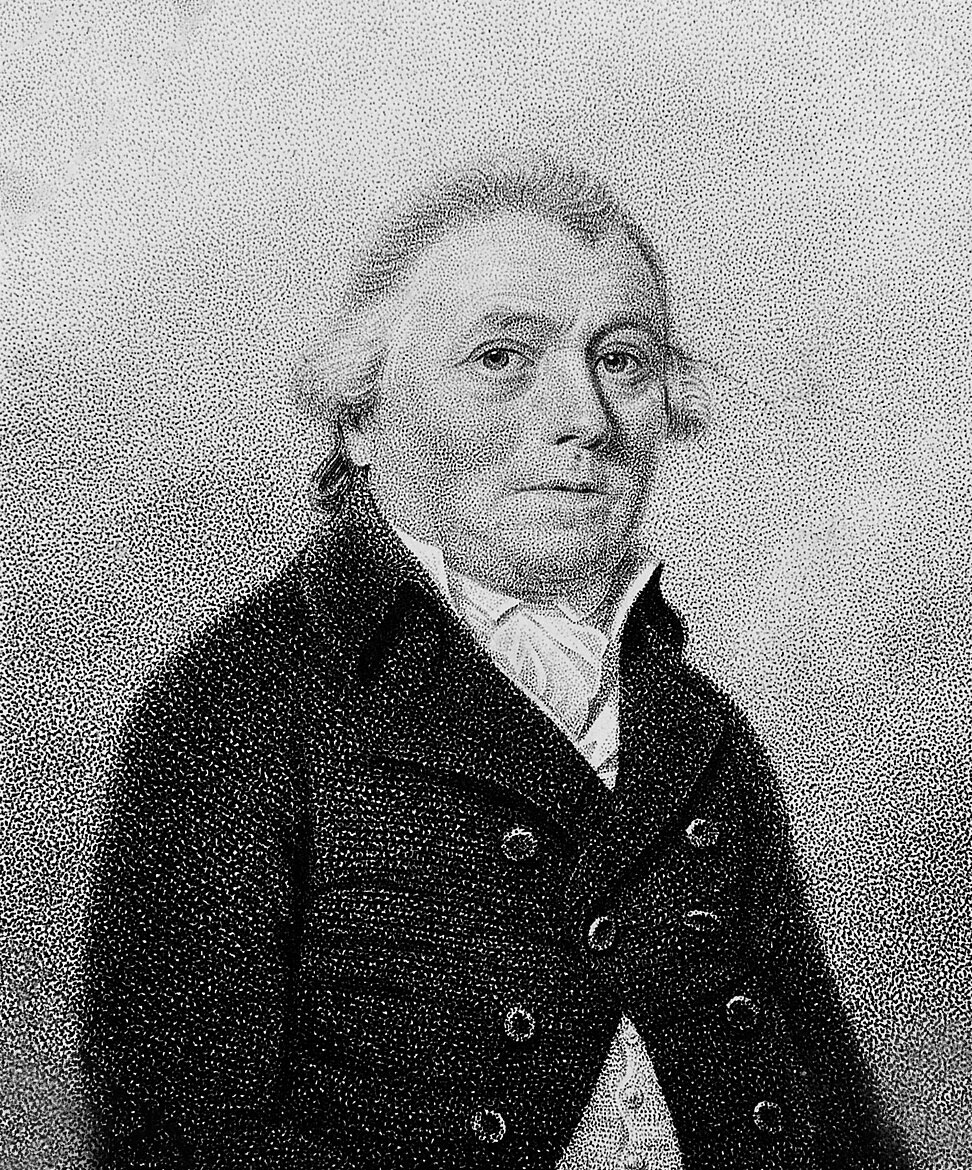
- A stipple engraving of William Forsyth
- Born: 1737; Oldmeldrum, Aberdeenshire, Scotland
- Died: 25 July 1804 (aged 66–67)
- Occupation: Botanist
- Scientific career
- Author abbrev. (botany): Forsyth

William Forsyth (1737 – 25 July 1804) was a Scottish botanist. He was a royal head gardener and a founding member of the Royal Horticultural Society. A genus of flowering plants, Forsythia, is named in his honour.

== Biography ==
Forsyth was born at Oldmeldrum in Aberdeenshire, and trained as a gardener at the Chelsea Physic Garden as a pupil of Philip Miller, the chief gardener. He took over the chief gardening position in 1771 and became a mentor to John Fraser. In 1784, he was appointed superintendent of the royal gardens at Kensington and St James's Palace, a position he kept until his death.

In 1774 he created one of the first rock gardens while curator of the Chelsea Physic Garden. His garden consisted of 40 tons of assorted stone collected from the roadside outside of the Tower of London, some flint and chalk from nearby downland, and some pieces of lava collected from Iceland. The garden failed to produce much serious growth.

Forsyth created a 'plaister' in 1798 made of lime, dung, ashes, soapsuds, urine, and other various components that was claimed to cure defects in trees and heal "where nothing remained but the bark." He received a grant of £1,500 from British parliament to continue the creation of the plaister, as the nation was at war in 1799 with Napoleon and needed sound timber to build ships, while the Royal Forests were in poor condition.

His great-grandson was the gardener and landscape architect Joseph Forsyth Johnson (1840–1906). Johnson was in turn the great-grandfather of the entertainer Bruce Forsyth (1928–2017).

== Selected works ==
- Observations on the Diseases, Defects, and Injuries in All Kinds of Fruit and Forest Trees (1st edition, 1791; 71 pages)
- A Treatise on the Culture and Management of Fruit Trees (1st edition, 1802)
