= Henrietta Liston =

British botanist

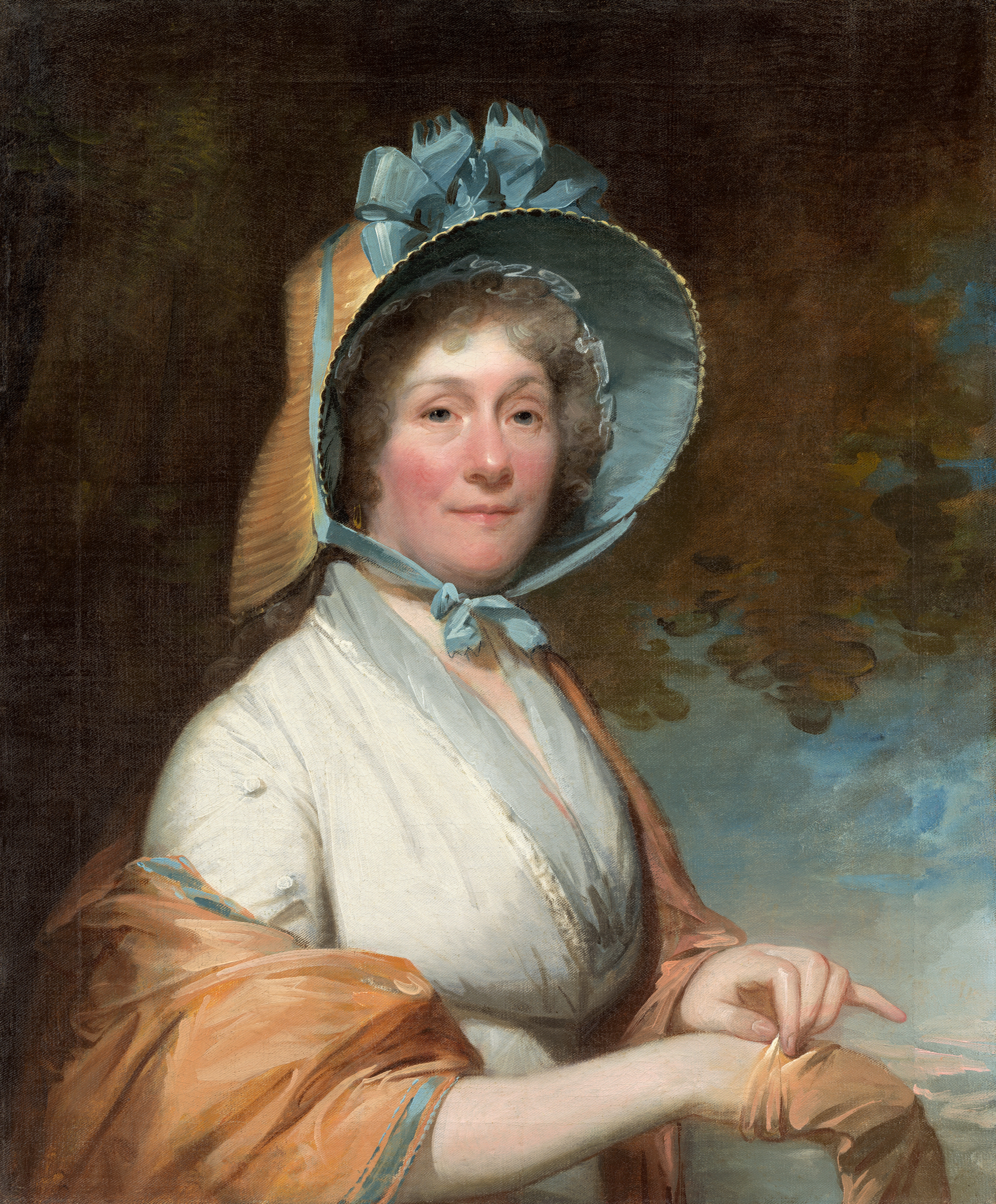
A portrait of Liston by Gilbert Stuart

Henrietta Liston (19 December 1751 – 6 October 1828) was a British botanist and wife of diplomat Robert Liston. The National Library of Scotland has digitized her journals.

== Biography ==
=== Early life ===
Henrietta was born on 19 December 1751 in Antigua to Scottish planter Nathaniel Marchant and his wife Sarah Nanton. Henrietta Marchant was baptized on 17 March 1752. Five of her 10 siblings died in childhood. She lost her mother when she was seven and her father when she was nine. Her father's will stated: 'To my daughter Henrieta Marchant £2000 c at 21 & 4 negros, her legacy if she die without issue to my 5 sons'. Henrietta therefore directly profited from slavery.

After the death of her parents, she moved with her brothers to her maternal aunt's residence in Glasgow. Her step uncle James Jackson ensured she was educated. She could speak French, owned a guitar and music books, and read novels and newspapers.

=== Later life ===
Henrietta married diplomat Robert Liston when she was 44 and he was 53, on 27 February 1796. Unusually for the time, her marriage contract allowed Henrietta to maintain control over her own wealth. After their wedding, they traveled directly down to London where Robert met with King George III, ahead of his posting to the United States in 1796.

While in the US, Henrietta Liston visited 16 states with her husband and collected botanical specimens that she sent back to Scotland. The couple also established friendships with George Washington and John Adams, of whom Henrietta's diaries contain favourable impressions. She also praises Alexander Hamilton, as "lively and animated in his conversation, gallant in his manners and sometimes brilliant in his sallies." She and her husband are credited with preparing an early foundation for the long-term "Special Relationship" between the United States and United Kingdom.

From their Philadelphia home, the Listons had travelled hundreds of miles north to Quebec in Lower Canada and south to Charleston, South Carolina. In May 1800, the couple had their portraits painted by Gilbert Stuart (1755-1828). They left the U.S six months later.

Henrietta later accompanied her husband to The Hague in 1802 and Copenhagen, Denmark in 1803. In 1812, her husband was reappointed ambassador in Constantinople (now Istanbul). Henrietta kept a journal of her time in the Ottoman Empire and sent back botanical species from Turkey to her home in Scotland. Robert was knighted in 1816 and Henrietta became Lady Liston.

Robert retired in 1820 and the couple moved back to Scotland. They received many friends and visitors, including novelist Walter Scott. Henrietta died on 6 October 1828 and was buried in Gogar Kirkyard, Edinburgh. Her husband died in 1836.

=== Millburn Tower and garden ===
The couple's residence Millburn Tower in Ratho was built to the design of architect William Atkinson. The garden was designed by Captain George Parkyns in 1804-5. It was here that Henrietta grew exotic plants from America, Caribbean and the Mediterranean. William McNab of the Royal Botanic Garden Edinburgh took care of the garden while the Listons were in Constantinople.

=== Diaries ===
Henrietta's journals provide deep insight into early American politics and the intellectual current. A book on her diaries and journals The Travel Journals of Henrietta Marchant Liston: North America and Lower Canada, 1796-1800, edited by L.V. North was published in 2014. On 2017 International Women's Day, the National Library of Scotland made a selection of her papers relating to her time in America available online. In 2020, it digitised her diaries describing her travels in the West Indies and her residency in the Ottoman Empire.

== In fiction ==
Henrietta Liston features as a character in Sara Sheridan's novel, The Fair Botanists (2021).

== In popular culture ==
She is portrayed in the miniseries "George Washington II: The Forging of a Nation" by Haviland Morris
