= Cloverdale-Idlewild =

Coordinates: 32°20′54″N 86°17′47″W

Cloverdale-Idlewild is a neighborhood in Montgomery, Alabama. It is circumscribed by Edgemont Street, Norman Bridge Road, Fairview Avenue, and Audubon Road.

== History ==
The neighborhood is built on land occupied by John Gindratt, who acquired the land in 1817 and established a plantation there. His house stood where Mastin Lane runs today. The next notable occupant in the area was John B. Mastin, who built a family home called "Fairview," for which Fairview Avenue is named; Mastin Lane is named for the family.

The Cloverdale-Idlewild neighborhood was developed in the 1930s. The area has been experiencing a resurgence in recent years as part of a trend of people moving away from suburbia and into cities.

The neighborhood was designated a local historic district by the city in 2001.
