= The Gardeners Dictionary =

Series of books by botanist Philip Miller

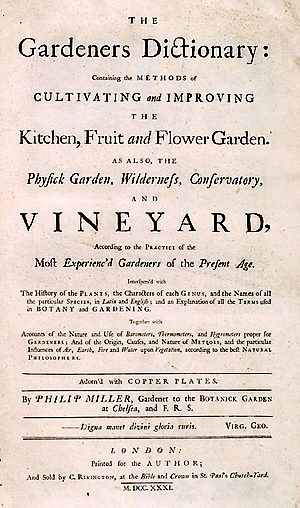
- Author: Philip Miller
- OCLC: 810387980

The Gardeners Dictionary is a widely cited reference series written by Philip Miller (1691–1771), which tended to focus on plants cultivated in England. Eight editions of the series were published in his lifetime. After his death, it was further developed by George Don as A general system of gardening and botany. Founded upon Miller's Gardener's dictionary, and arranged according to the natural system (1831–1838).

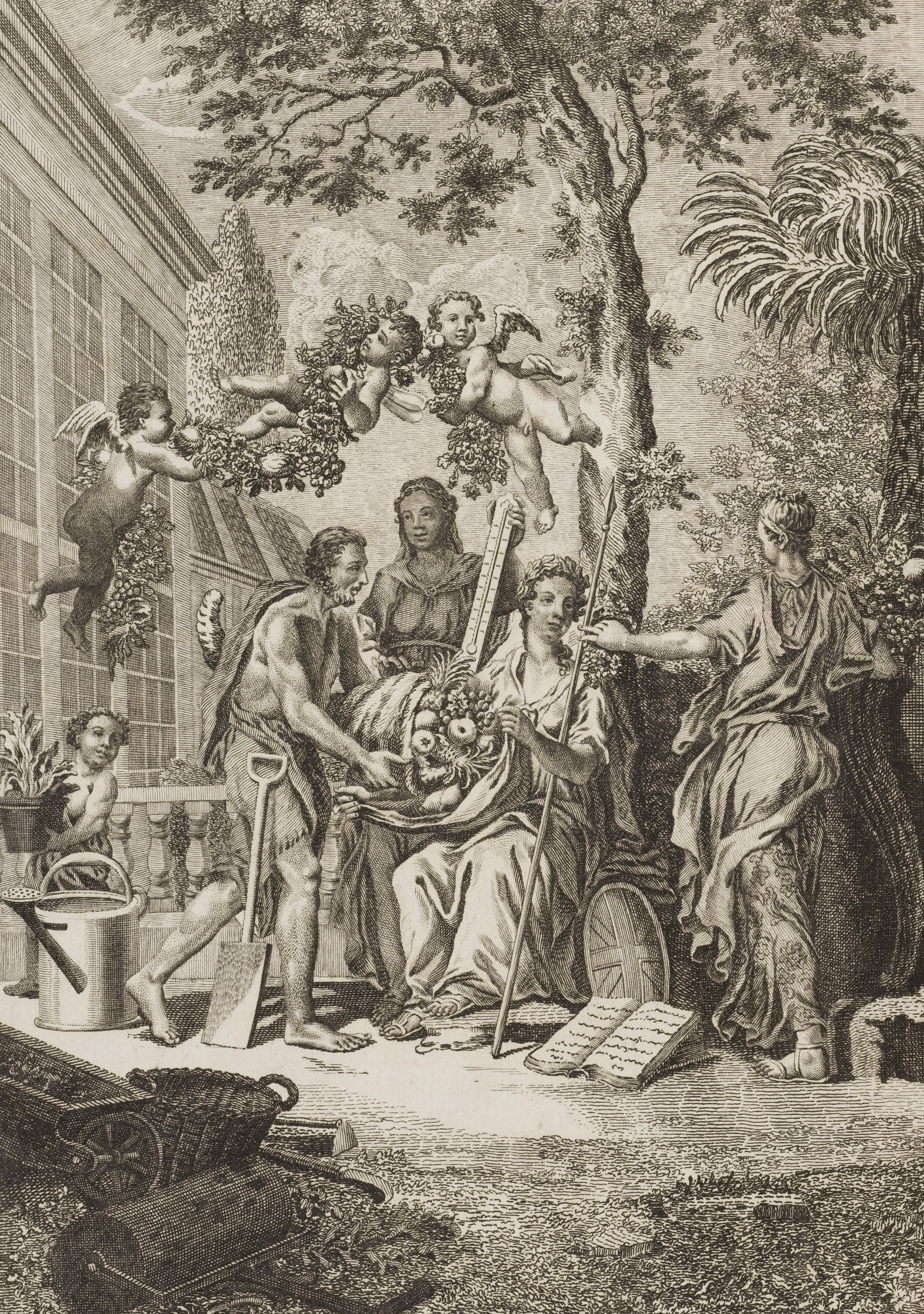
Britannia presented with cornucopiae including pineapples by allegories of Nature, Industry, and Science, with an orangery in the background (frontispiece of The Gardeners Dictionary, 1764)

== Editions ==
Year(s)	Edition	Title
1731; Abridged 1735	1st	The Gardeners Dictionary. Containing the Methods of Cultivating and Improving the Kitchen, Fruit and Flower Garden, as also the Physick Garden, Wilderness, Conservatory and Vineyard. Abridged 1735
1741	2nd	
1748	3rd	
1754	4th	The Gardeners Dictionary. Containing the Methods of Cultivating and Improving All Sorts of Trees, Plants, and Flowers, for the Kitchen, Fruit, and Pleasure Gardens; As Also Those Which Are Used in Medicine. With Directions for the Culture of Vineyards, and Making of Wine, in England. In Which Likewise Are Included the Practical Parts of Husbandry. Abridged From the Last Folio Edition, by the Author, Philip Miller, ..., In Three Volumes... The Fourth Edition, Corrected and Enlarged. Reprinted 1969
1763	5th	
1752	6th	The Gardeners Dictionary; Containing the Methods of Cultivating and Improving the Kitchen, Fruit and Flower Garden, as also, the Physick Garden, Wilderness, Conservatory and Vineyard. Interspers'd with the History of the Plants, the Characters of Each Genus, and the Names of all the Particular Species, in Latin and English, and an Explanation of all the Terms Used in Botany and Gardening. Abridged edition 1771
1759, 1764	7th	
1768	8th	The Gardeners Dictionary: Containing the Best and Newest Methods of Improving the Kitchen, Fruit, Flower Garden, and Nursery; As Also for Performing the Practical Parts of Agriculture: Including the Management of Vineyards, with the Methods of Making and Preserving Wine, According to the Present Practice of the Most Skilful Vignerons in the Several Wine Countries in Europe. Together With Directions for Propagating and Improving, From Real Practice and Experience, All Sorts of Timber Trees. The Eighth Edition, Revised and Altered According to the Latest System of Biology; and Embellished with Several Copper Plates, Which Were not in Some Former Editions.
