= Philip Miller =

British botanist (1691–1771)

Philip Miller FRS
- Born: 1691; Deptford or Greenwich
- Died: 18 December 1771 (aged 79–80)
- Known for: The Gardeners Dictionary
- Scientific career
- Fields: Botany, horticulture
- Institutions: Chelsea Physic Garden
- Notable students: William Aiton, William Forsyth
- Author abbrev. (botany): Mill.

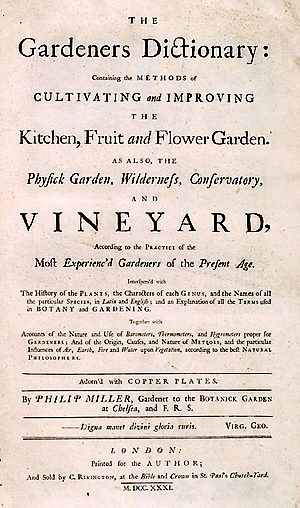
The Gardeners Dictionary: Containing the Methods of Cultivating and Improving the Kitchen, Fruit and Flower Garden.

Philip Miller FRS (1691 – 18 December 1771) was an English botanist and gardener of Scottish descent. Miller was chief gardener at the Chelsea Physic Garden for nearly 50 years from 1722, and wrote the highly popular The Gardeners Dictionary.

== Life ==
Born in Deptford or Greenwich, Miller was chief gardener at the Chelsea Physic Garden from 1722 until he was pressured to retire shortly before his death. According to the botanist Peter Collinson, who visited the physic garden in July 1764 and recorded his observation in his commonplace books, Miller "has raised the reputation of the Chelsea Garden so much that it excels all the gardens of Europe for its amazing variety of plants of all orders and classes and from all climates..." He wrote The Gardener's and Florists Dictionary or a Complete System of Horticulture (1724) and The Gardener's Dictionary containing the Methods of Cultivating and Improving the Kitchen Fruit and Flower Garden, which first appeared in 1731 in an impressive folio and passed through eight expanding editions in his lifetime and was translated into Dutch by Job Baster. (Note: The botanical engravings in the eighth edition (1752) provided subjects painted on Chelse plates.)

== Botanical work ==
Miller corresponded with other botanists, and obtained plants from all over the world, many of which he cultivated for the first time in England and is credited as their introducer. His knowledge of living plants, for which he was elected a Fellow of the Royal Society, was unsurpassed in breadth in his lifetime. He trained William Aiton, who later became head gardener at Kew, and William Forsyth, after whom Forsythia was named. The Duke of Bedford contracted him to supervise the pruning of fruit trees at Woburn Abbey and the care of his prized collection of American trees, especially evergreens, which were grown from seeds that, on Miller's suggestion, had been sent in barrels from Pennsylvania, where they had been collected by John Bartram. Through a consortium of sixty subscribers, 1733–66, the contents of Bartram's boxes introduced such American trees as Abies balsamea and Pinus rigida into English gardens.

Miller was reluctant to use the new binomial nomenclature of Carl Linnaeus, preferring the classifications of Joseph Pitton de Tournefort and John Ray at first. Linnaeus, nevertheless, applauded Miller's Gardeners Dictionary, The conservative Scot actually retained a number of pre-Linnaean binomial signifiers discarded by Linnaeus but which have been retained by modern botanists. He only fully changed to the Linnaean system in the edition of The Gardeners Dictionary of 1768, though he had already described some genera, such as Larix and Vanilla, validly under the Linnaean system earlier, in the fourth edition (1754). (Note: This edition, "corrected and enlarged" and also "abridged from the last folio edition, was reprinted in a handsome facsimile with an introduction by W.T. Stearn in 1969.)

Miller sent the first long-strand cotton seeds, which he had developed, to the new British American colony of Georgia in 1733. They were first planted on Sea Island, off the coast of Georgia, and hence derived the name of the finest cotton, Sea Island Cotton.

The presumed portrait, engraved by C.J. Maillet and affixed to the posthumous French edition of Miller's Gardeners Dictionary, 1787, shows the wrong Miller, John Frederick Miller, son of the London-based Nuremberg artist Johann Sebastian Müller. (Note: The error is demonstrated by Allen Paterson 1986:40–41.) No authentic portrait is known.

Miller's two sons worked under him; one, Charles, became the first head of the Cambridge University Botanic Garden.

== Bibliography ==
- Philip Miller and the Gardeners Dictionary. University of Toronto
