= William Wright (botanist) =

Scottish physician and botanist (1735–1819)

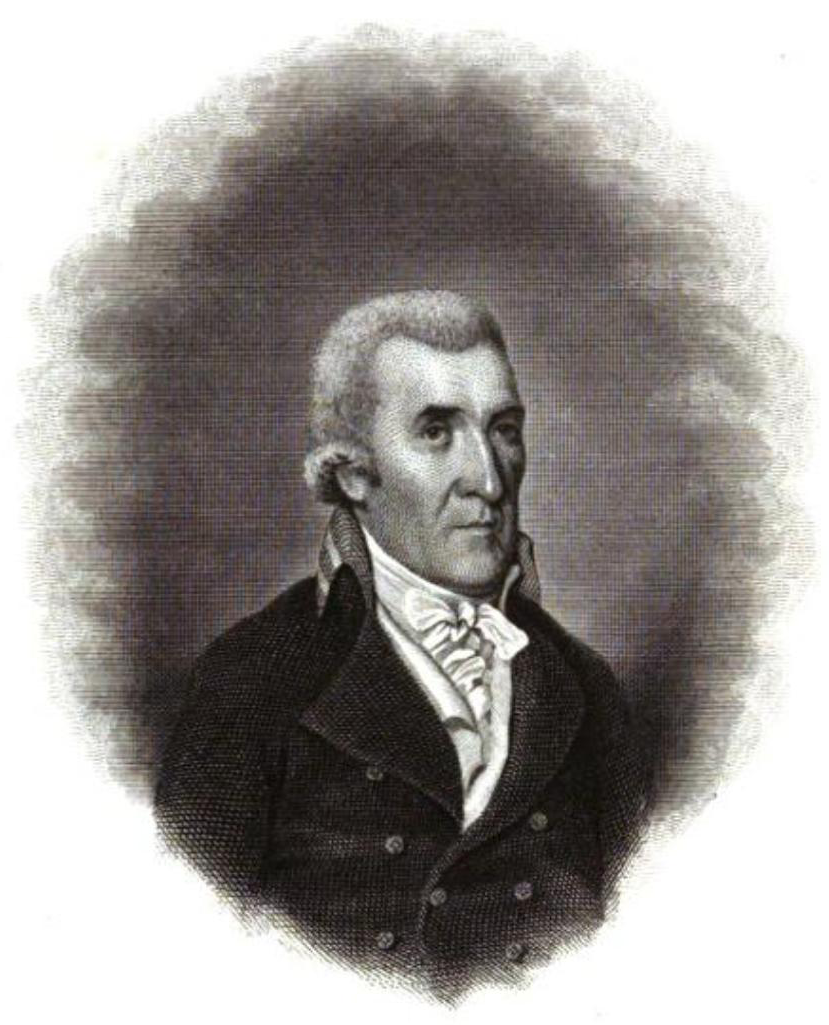

William Wright FRS FRSE FRCPE FLS FSA Scot MWS (1735–1819) was a Scottish physician, botanist and slave owner. In 1783 he was a joint founder of the Royal Society of Edinburgh.

== Life ==
He was born in March 1735 in Crieff, Perthshire, and was educated at Crieff Grammar School. He served as an apprentice physician with G Dennistoun in Falkirk from 1752 to 1756. He then studied medicine at University of Edinburgh. In 1758 he joined the Royal Navy as a surgeon, serving in the West Indies until 1763. He obtained his doctorate (MD) from St Andrews University in 1763. , and became a navy surgeon in 1760. He was elected to the American Philosophical Society in 1774. Wright was a slaveowner and opposed the abolition of slavery.

In 1764 Wright became the assistant to a Dr. Gray on a sugar plantation in Kingston, Jamaica, where he invested the income from his medical practice into slaves and land. In partnership with Dr Thomas Steel, he built Orange Hill estate where his medical practice was responsible for the medical treatment of 1200 enslaved people, and the local free population. By 1771, Wright owned thirty-three slaves. It was during this time that he became a collector of Jamaican plants, and established himself as a botanist. Appointed Surgeon General of Jamaica in 1774, Wright stayed on the island until 1777 then spent two years in London. He enrolled in the British Navy in 1779 and was captured by the French. He returned to Jamaica in 1782 and the following year became Physician in Chief of the colony. He sold his property in Jamaica in 1784 following the death of Steel, the proceeds of which supported him for the rest of his life. He returned to Scotland in 1786, largely living in Edinburgh.

He joined an expedition led by Sir Ralph Abercromby (1734–1801) exploring the Caribbean from 1796 to 1798.

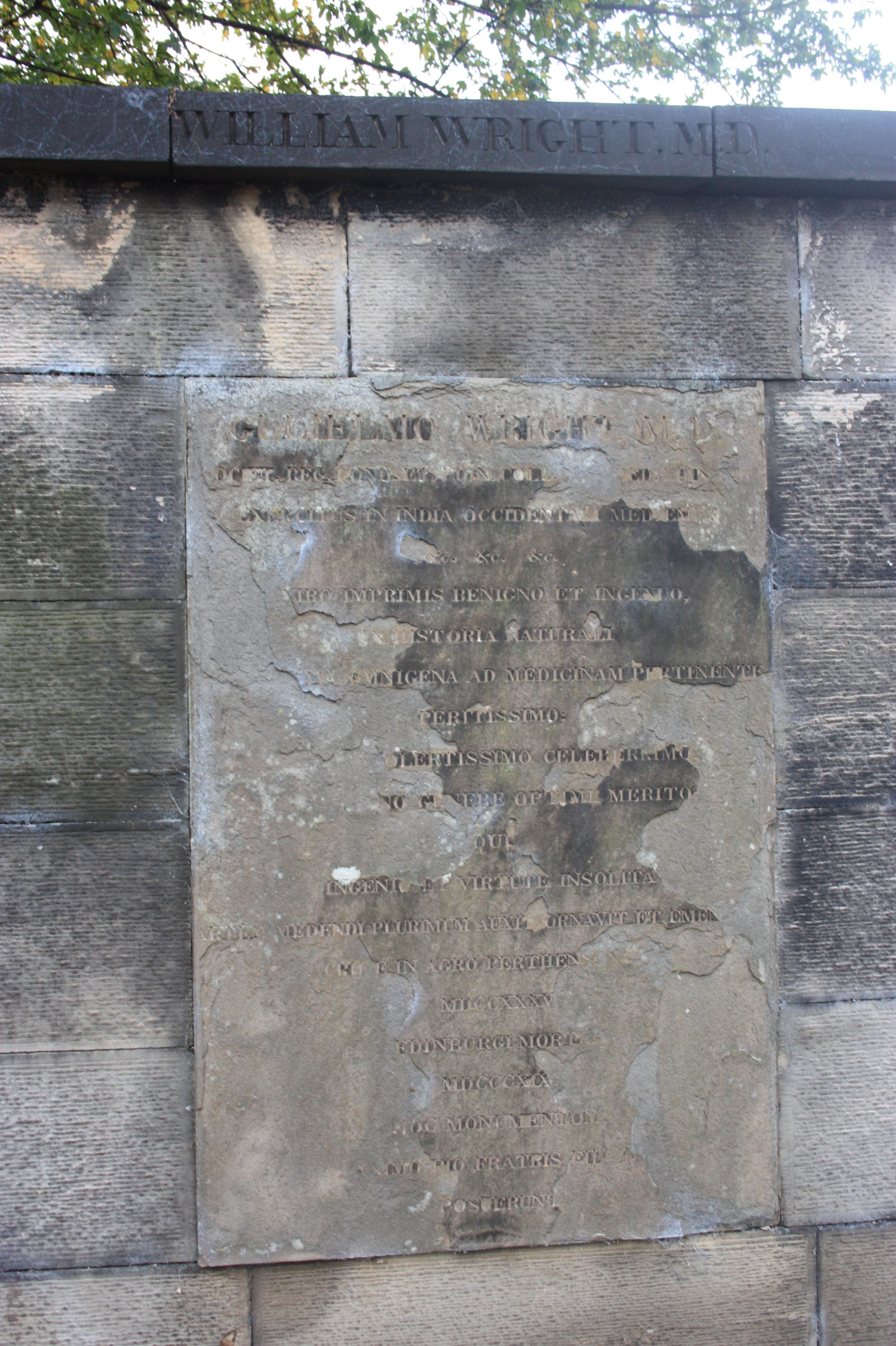
The grave of Dr William Wright, Greyfriars Kirkyard, Edinburgh

William Wright became a Fellow of the Royal Society in 1778. He was a member in numerous societies, among them the Linnean Society of London of which he became associate member in 1807; the Wernerian Natural History Society in 1808, of which he was a founding member; the Royal College of Physicians of Edinburgh, over which he presided in 1801.

Wright published numerous articles in medicine. His Jamaican collections became an important contribution to natural history. Notably, he described more than 750 plant species, and owned 33 slaves.

He lived his final years at 51 Hanover Street in Edinburgh's New Town.

In 1795 he was visited by Johann Gottfried Schmeisser.

He died in Edinburgh on 19 September 1819 and is buried in the north west section of the western extension to Greyfriars Kirkyard. He never married and had no children.

== Botanical Reference ==
The genus Wrightia (Apocynaceae) and Wrightea (syn. Wallichia, Arecaceae) were dedicated to him. Wrightia was by Robert Brown (1773–1858) and Wrightea by William Roxburgh (1759–1815).

== Sources ==
- Ray Desmond (1994). Dictionary of British and Irish Botanists and Horticulturists including Plant Collectors, Flower Painters and Garden Designers. Taylor & Francis and The Natural History Museum (Londres).
