= Everychild Foundation =

U.S. private philanthropic foundation

- Formation: 1999
- Type: Nonprofit organization
- Headquarters: Pacific Palisades, California, United States
- Founder and President: Jacqueline Caster
- Key people: Lisa Cleri Reale; Kristie Hubbard; Lauren Turner
- Revenue: $1,125,738 (2015)
- Expenses: $1,409,973 (2015)
- Website: www.everychildfoundation.org

The Everychild Foundation is a private philanthropic foundation based in Pacific Palisades, California. It awards a single grant of up to $1 million each year to a non-profit organization within Los Angeles County that helps children affected by disease, abuse, neglect, poverty or disability by launching or expanding a new innovative, replicable project . The Foundation has awarded more than $19 million in grants that served over 1 million Los Angeles children. The idea is to leverage the grant dollars in order to have a wider impact with replication.

The Foundation was started in 1999 by Jacqueline Jacobs Caster. It relies on member dues to fund grants; Everychild members make a tax-deductible contribution. There are no fund raising events or paid staff, and low overhead.

== History ==
Caster was dissatisfied with the use of charity events to raise their funds. The production of these events can consume large amounts of time and money while yielding relatively small returns. According to the National Center for Charitable Statistics at the Urban Institute, of the 102,353 public charities reporting special fund-raising events in 2005, the average return was slightly less than 40 cents on the dollar with $5.92 billion in total production costs and a net of $3.9 billion.

Caster, a lawyer and urban planner, launched the foundation on a different model. It began with a membership of 56 women. In 2001, it issued its first grant for $230,000 to fund a mobile dental clinic operated by QueensCare, a nonprofit healthcare provider serving the indigent, and staffed by the USC School of Dentistry. By 2007, with 225 members, the Foundation issued its first $1 million grant, an amount which has been repeated every year since. In 2019, the group began awarding $100,000 to the runner-up candidate for the annual grant.

== Model ==
The Everychild Foundation is organized as a 501(c)(3) nonprofit organization. Its intends to alleviate youth suffering in the Los Angeles metropolitan area by fulfilling needs of children that are unmet because of disease, disability, abuse, neglect or poverty.

All funds of the Everychild Foundation are derived from its members who each commit $6,000 annually (increased from $5,000 in 2019 in order to fund a runner-up grant and adjust for 20 years of cost of living increases) to the Foundation. The membership has very low annual attrition rate (roughly 5%). Recruitment is primarily through word of mouth and small, member-hosted breakfasts.

The primary work of the Foundation is the identification and screening of potential grantees and oversight once a grant is awarded. The Grant Screening Board is made up of 20 Everychild members who spend the year reviewing proposals and ultimately selecting two finalists. The process includes review of documents provided by the grant applicant, site visits, and analysis of the need for and viability of the proposed project and its budget. To prevent an entrenched group controlling the Foundation's grant process, committee terms are for three years and are staggered for continuity. The entire membership of the 200+ women vote on the final selection of the winner of the $1 million annual grant. However, in 2020 and 2021, the foundation has instead divided the $1 million to award multiple emergency operating grants to worthy agencies whose donations have decreased and demand for their services has exploded as a result of the COVID-19 pandemic.

The Foundation has two other major operating committees. The Grant Outreach Committee is responsible for contacting agencies that may have a proposal that is eligible for the Everychild grant. If an agency appears eligible, committee members work with it to help it prepare Letters of Inquiry, the first stage of the grant application process. Membership on this committee is limited to those who have already served on the Grant Screening Board.

The Grant Monitoring Committee is responsible for monitoring the post-award status of funded projects. Under the terms of the grant agreement with recipient agencies, members of this committee visit the project site twice a year to assure that it is being implemented appropriately.

There have been more than 30 spin off groups in the United States and Great Britain based upon the Everychild Foundation model.

== Other activities ==
In recent years, the Everychild Foundation, through its policy committee, has become involved in policy issues in three major areas: support for infants and toddlers ages 0 to 3; advocacy for children aging out of the foster care system at age 18; and reform of the juvenile justice system. Activities include support for legislation in these areas and collaboration with other groups and agencies in efforts in these areas.

The Foundation also holds Salons throughout the year for experts and interested members to discuss children's issues in depth. These Salons have recently addressed the topics of autism, childhood asthma, and public education. Salon speakers have included former Supreme Court Justice Sandra Day O'Conner and Representative Henry Waxman among others.

== Bibliography ==
- https://ssir.org/articles/entry/avoiding_the_pitfalls_that_can_impede_a_giving_circles_success
- "Women Reinventing Philanthropy: The Everychild Foundation Model at Work" (PDF). The Center in Philanthropy at Indiana University. May 2009. Archived from the original (PDF) on 2010-06-10.. Available from
- "Jacqueline Caster’s (’83) Everychild Foundation: a decade of success". Boston University School of Law.
- "How to Make Dreams Come True". Privilege Magazine. May 2005.
- "Women Push for Everychild". The Palisadian Post. April 28, 2005.
- "Join a Circle of Friends and Give to Charity". Kiplinger's Retirement Report. March 1, 2005.
- "Good Turns – Charitable Group Keeps Its Giving Simple". Los Angeles Times. August 25, 2002.
- "Jackie Caster Cuts Fat from Charity Giving". Palisadian Post. March 15, 2001.
