= James Haig Ferguson =

Scottish obstetrician and gynaecologist

James Haig Ferguson FRSE, FRCPE FRCSEd
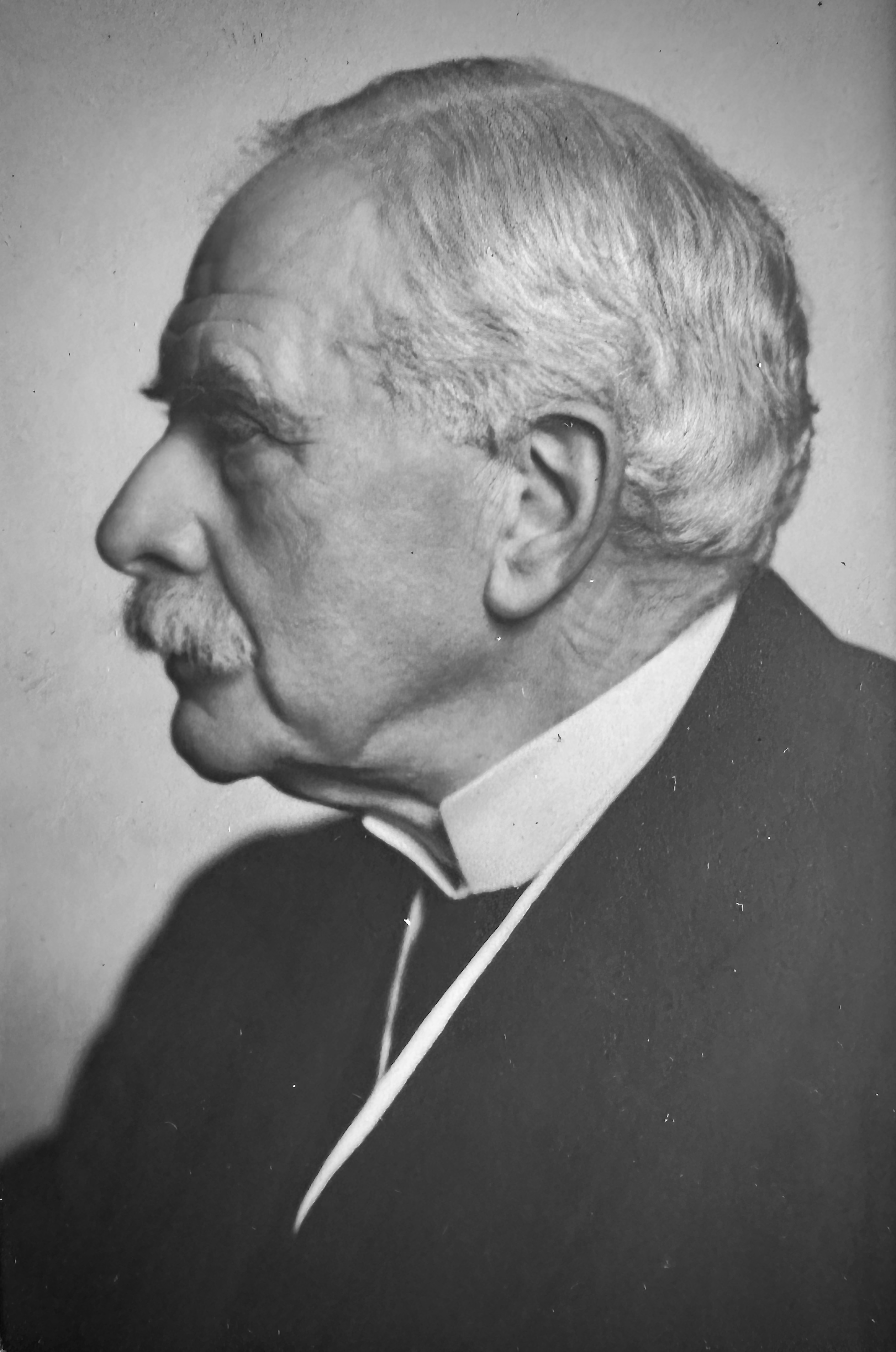
- Born: 18 December 1862; Fossoway, Scotland
- Died: 2 May 1934 (aged 71); Edinburgh, Scotland
- Education: Edinburgh Collegiate School; University of Edinburgh
- Occupations: Obstetrician and gynaecologist
- Known for: Presidency Royal College of Surgeons of Edinburgh
- Term: 1929-1931
- Spouse: Penelope Gordon Watson (m. 1889)
- Children: 2 sons, 3 daughters
- Parent(s): Rev. William Ferguson, Elizabeth Haig

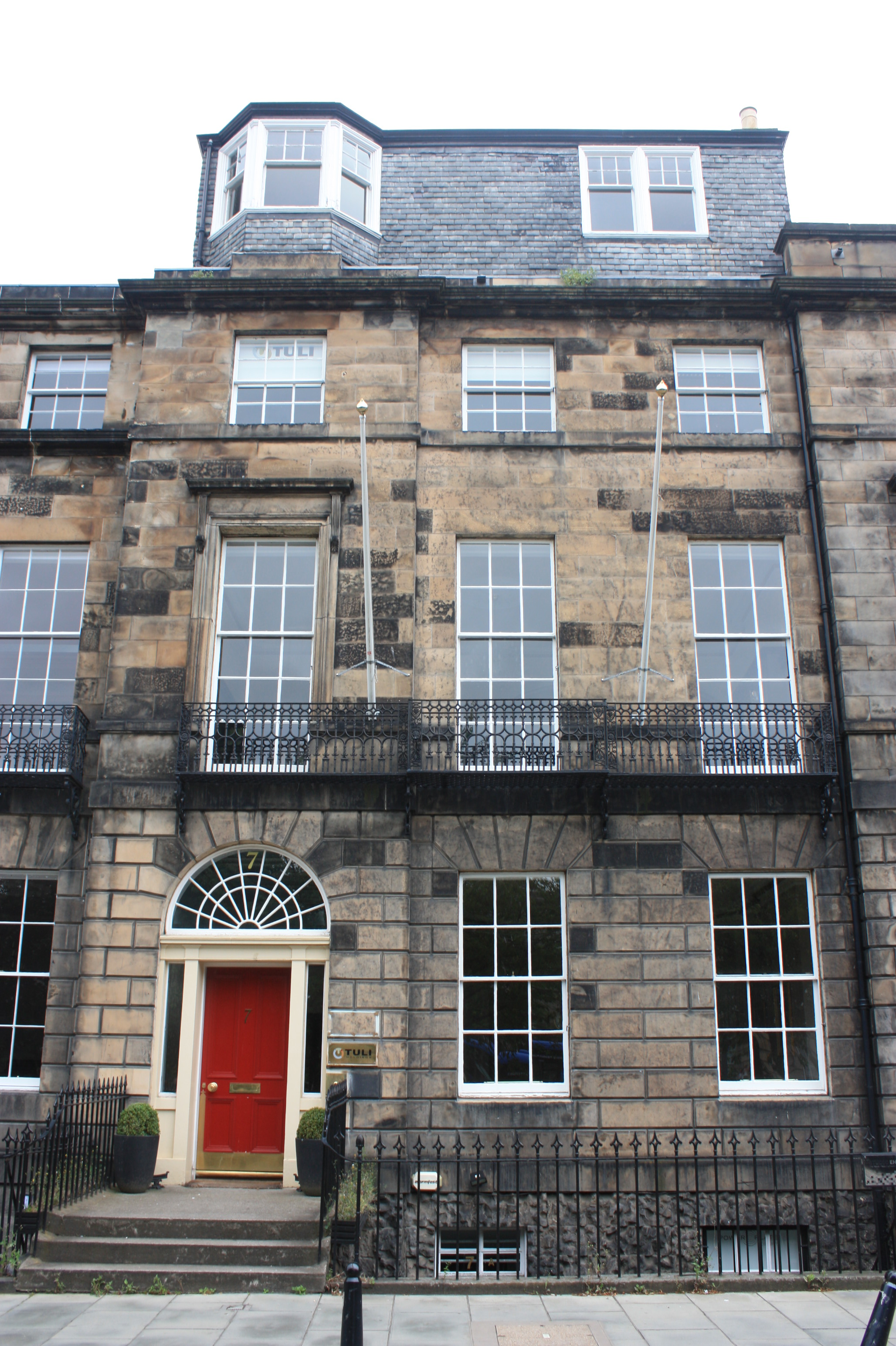
7 Coates Crescent, Edinburgh

James Haig Ferguson (18 December 1862 – 2 May 1934) was a Scottish obstetrician and gynaecologist. He served as President of the Royal College of Surgeons of Edinburgh from 1929 to 1931 and was president of the Edinburgh Obstetrical Society. He chaired the Central Midwives Board of Scotland and was manager of Donaldson's School for the Deaf. In 1929 he was a founding member of the British (later Royal) College of Obstetricians and Gynaecologists.

In 1899 he founded the Lauriston Home for unmarried mothers to give birth without chastisement. The home was renamed as the Haig Ferguson Memorial Home following his death until its closure in 1974.

== Early life ==
He was born on 18 December 1862, in the manse at Fossoway, Perthshire, the son of Elizabeth Haig of Dollarfield and Rev. William Ferguson, the local minister. He attended the Edinburgh Collegiate School before entering the faculty of medicine of the University of Edinburgh. He graduated MB CM in 1884 and in the same year became a Member of the Royal College of Surgeons of England.

== Medical career ==
He worked as a resident physician under Dr Claude Muirhead at the Royal Infirmary of Edinburgh on Lauriston Place, and as resident physician at the Royal Hospital for Sick Children in Edinburgh. He then became private assistant to the obstetrician Dr (later Sir) John Halliday Croom, which marked the start of his career in obstetrics and gynaecology. In 1887 Haig Ferguson became a Member of the Royal College of Physicians of Edinburgh and two years later he was elected a Fellow. This qualification was regarded as the most appropriate for obstetricians at this time, but it was also advantageous to Haig Ferguson as he conducted a large general practice in addition to his developing obstetric practice. In 1890 he obtained from the University of Edinburgh the degree of Doctor of Medicine (MD) with honours. From 1896 he was Assistant Gynaecologist at the Royal Infirmary. In 1898 he was appointed gynaecologist to Leith Hospital and assistant physician to the Edinburgh Royal Maternity Hospital one year later. Realising that gynaecology was becoming increasingly surgical in its practice and in order to establish his surgical credentials, he obtained the Fellowship of the Royal College of Surgeons of Edinburgh by examination in 1902.

During this period he taught obstetrics and gynaecology in the extramural School of Medicine of the Royal Colleges of Edinburgh.

In 1906 Haig Ferguson was appointed assistant gynaecologist to the Royal Infirmary. During this time, in addition to his Royal Infirmary practice he served on the governing bodies of the Royal Hospital for Sick Children, Donaldson’s Hospital, Merchiston Castle School and the Queen’s Institute of District Nursing. His single most important public service was as a member of the Central Midwives Board for Scotland, acting as its chairman for 13 years.

In 1919 he became gynaecologist in charge of wards in the Royal Infirmary. One lasting contribution to obstetrics was the invention of the obstetric forceps that bear his name, which he first described and used in 1926. These are described as mid-cavity forceps and are still used in the 21st century.

In 1928/9 he conducted an extended exchange of correspondence with the Russian gynaecologist Vasily Stroganov in Leningrad. These concerned translation of Stroganov’s book The Improved Prophylactic Method in the Treatment of Eclampsia (published New York, 1930).

He retired in 1927.

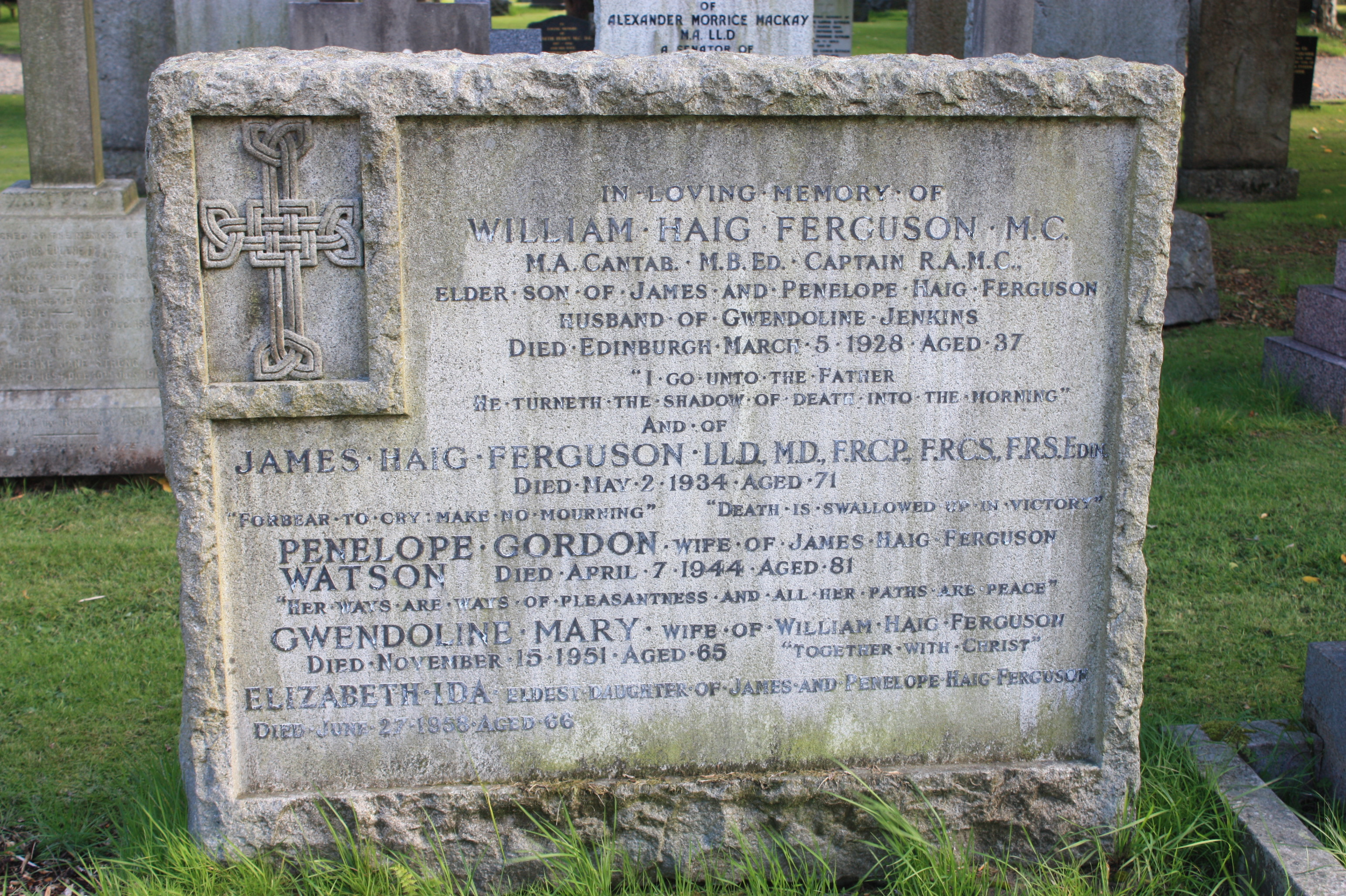
The grave of James Haig Ferguson, Dean Cemetery, Edinburgh

== Awards and honours ==
In 1892 he was elected a member of the Harveian Society of Edinburgh and served as President in 1932. In 1904 he was elected a Fellow of the Royal Society of Edinburgh. His proposers were Sir William Turner, Alexander Crum Brown, Sir Patrick Heron Watson (his father-in-law), and Sir John Halliday Croom. In 1921 he was elected a member of the Aesculapian Club. He was president of the Edinburgh Obstetrical Society, and in 1929 was elected president of the Royal College of Surgeons of Edinburgh. The University of Edinburgh awarded him the Honorary degree of Doctor of Laws (LLD).

== Family and later life ==
In 1889 he married Penelope Gordon Watson (1863-1944), daughter of Patrick Heron Watson. They had two sons, William Haig Ferguson, Patrick Haig W. Ferguson, and three daughters, Elizabeth Barbara Ferguson, Isobel C. Ferguson, Penelope Dorothy Ferguson. In 1901 the family lived at 25 Rutland Street but later moved to 7 Coates Crescent in Edinburgh’s West End. He suffered from ill-health through most of his retirement and died at home in Coates Crescent on 2 May 1934. His funeral service took place on 4 May in St George’s Parish Church on Charlotte Square (now West Register House). He is buried in Dean Cemetery.

== Publications ==
- Handbook of Obstetric Nursing (1889) with Dr F W N Haultain
- A Combined Textbook of Obstetrics and Gynaecology (1923) (co-author)
