= Ernest Fahmy =

Scotland international rugby union player, obstetrician & gynaecologist

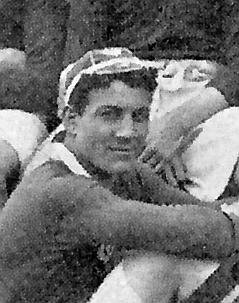
- Fahmy being capped for Scotland in 1920
- Born: Ernest Chalmers Fahmy; 28 November 1892; Amoy, China
- Died: 28 August 1982 (aged 89); Edinburgh, Scotland
- Education: Eltham College, Kent; University of Edinburgh
- Occupation(s): Obstetrician and gynaecologist
- Known for: Scotland Rugby International
- Medical career
- Institutions: Royal Infirmary of Edinburgh, Simpson Memorial Maternity Pavilion

Ernest Chalmers Fahmy FRCSEd, FRCOG (28 November 1892 – 25 August 1982) was a Scottish obstetrician and gynaecologist. Shortly after qualifying in medicine, he played for the Scotland international rugby team on four occasions. He became an obstetrician and gynaecologist in Edinburgh and was a founder member of the British (later Royal) College of Obstetricians and Gynaecologists. He served as president of the Edinburgh Obstetrical Society.

== Early life ==
Fahmy was born in 1892 in Amoy, Fujian Province, China. His father, Ahmed Fahmy, who was of Egyptian descent, had graduated in medicine from the University of Edinburgh and had become a medical missionary in China with the London Missionary Society. His mother, Mary Auchterloney Chalmers was from Edinburgh.

Ernest Fahmy went to school at Eltham College, Kent, a school for the sons of missionaries. From there he went on to study medicine at the University of Edinburgh from 1911, but joined the army on the outbreak of the First World War in 1914. He served with the Royal Artillery on the Western Front where he was wounded on 3 occasions. He was invalided out of the army and resumed his medical studies at Edinburgh, graduating MB ChB in 1918. After resident hospital posts in Edinburgh, he spent three and a half years as a general practitioner in Abertillery, South Wales.

== Rugby career ==
At university, Fahmy had proved to be a talented track athlete, gymnast and rugby union player. He was awarded a university blue for rugby in 1913 and in that year was selected for and played in a trial for Scotland. On moving to Wales, he joined Abertillery Rugby Football Club. He was given the option of playing for Wales but opted to play for Scotland. He played in Scotland's four international matches in 1920 and was on the winning side on three occasions.

== Medical career ==
Having decided on a career in obstetrics and gynaecology he returned to Edinburgh in 1922. He was house surgeon to Dr James Haig Ferguson in the Royal Infirmary of Edinburgh (RIE) and then resident obstetrician in the Edinburgh Royal Maternity and Simpson Memorial Maternity Hospital (SMMP).

In 1923 he became a Fellow of the Royal College of Surgeons of Edinburgh and the following year was appointed assistant in the university department of midwifery and gynaecology initially under Professor B P Watson and then under Professor R W Johnstone. In these posts he established a reputation as a dynamic and inspiring teacher of both students and postgraduates. He was appointed gynaecologist to Kirkcaldy General Hospital and Leith Hospital and then to the RIE. In 1944 he succeeded to the charge of wards in the RIE and the SMMP.

In 1926 he was elected a member of the Harveian Society of Edinburgh. He was a foundation member of the British College (later the Royal College) of Obstetricians and Gynaecologists and he became a Fellow (FRCOG) in 1936. From 1948 to 1951 he was President of the Edinburgh Obstetrical Society.

Fahmy contributed chapters to the earlier editions of the multi-author Combined Textbook of Obstetrics and Gynaecology for students and medical practitioners, edited by Professor Dugald Baird.

He retired in 1958.

== Family and later life ==
His father Ahmed Fahmy had established a hospital for the poor in Zhangzhou, Fujian Province, China. At a meeting in Edinburgh he met the young Eric Liddell and inspired him to become a missionary in China.

Ernest Fahmy married Alexandrina Milne in Edinburgh on 14 July 1920. They had a son, Eric, who became a pilot in the Royal Air Force and was lost in 1942 on a flight from Gibraltar to Malta., and a daughter Joan (born 1933), married in 1956 to Thomas L. Johnston. Joan died in Edinburgh in 2024.

Fahmy died in Edinburgh in 1982.

== Selected publications ==
- "Hyperemesis Gravidarum." Edinb Med J. 1940 Dec; 47(12): 822–835.
- "Some Observations on the Management of the Third Stage of Labour." Trans Edinb Obstet Soc. 1936; 56: 89–103
