= Edinburgh Obstetrical Society =

Coordinates: 55°55′21″N 3°08′21″W

- Formation: 1840
- Founder: Robert Bowes Malcolm
- Headquarters: Edinburgh
- Fields: Obstetrics

The Edinburgh Obstetrical Society is a learned society in Edinburgh devoted to obstetrics. It was founded in 1840 by Robert Bowes Malcolm and boasts James Young Simpson as their most eminent past member.

== Origins ==
The society was established by Robert Bowes Malcolm in 1840 and is the oldest obstetrical society in the UK. Simpson was a pre-eminent founding member in the history of the society. Dr William Beilby took first presidency, which lasted the customary two years. Other presidents included Charles Bell, John Burn, Sir Alexander Russell Simpson, Sir John Halliday Croom and Ernest Fahmy. Numerous presidents have been pioneers in obstetric history, including creators of forceps, Robert Milne Murray and James Haig Ferguson and a founder of antenatal care, John William Ballantyne.

== Simpson and society ==
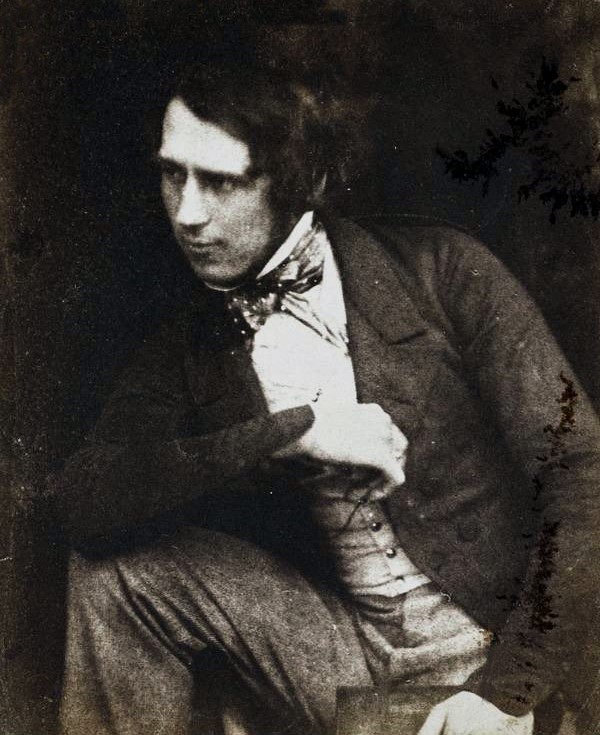
James Young Simpson, c. 1843-47

The society's longest running president was James Young Simpson, who was elected in 1841 at the age of 30. He continued in this role for the next 16 years and in 1866, returned to serve another year. His innovations in anaesthetics and properties of chloroform in November 1847 overshadowed his contributions to obstetrics. Simpson used ether to relieve labour pains, to the appreciation of many women but the disapproval of some contemporaries and the church.

== Awards ==
Acknowledgements were made to obstetricians from around the world in the form of honorary fellowships. Thomas Cullen, Howard Kelly of Baltimore and Albert Döderlein of Munich were awarded such fellowships, as was Vasili Vasilievich Stroganoff of Leningrad. The inventor of the retractor, Doyen, and the pioneer of the antenatal stethoscope, Adolphe Pinard, also became fellows. Other recipients have included William Beilby, Charles Bell, John Halliday Croom, Gustavus Murray, Robert Milne Murray, Alexander Russell Simpson, and James Simson.

== Transactions of the society ==
The Transactions were published in bound volumes until 1938. By that time, 733 fellows had been elected. Gustavus Murray, one of the role models for Luke Fildes' painting, The Doctor, made contributions to the journal in its early days.

== Today ==
The society continues today, and is associated with the University of Edinburgh.

== External links ==
- Official website
