= Benjamin Philip Watson =

Professor of obstetrics and gynecology

Benjamin Philip Watson FACS
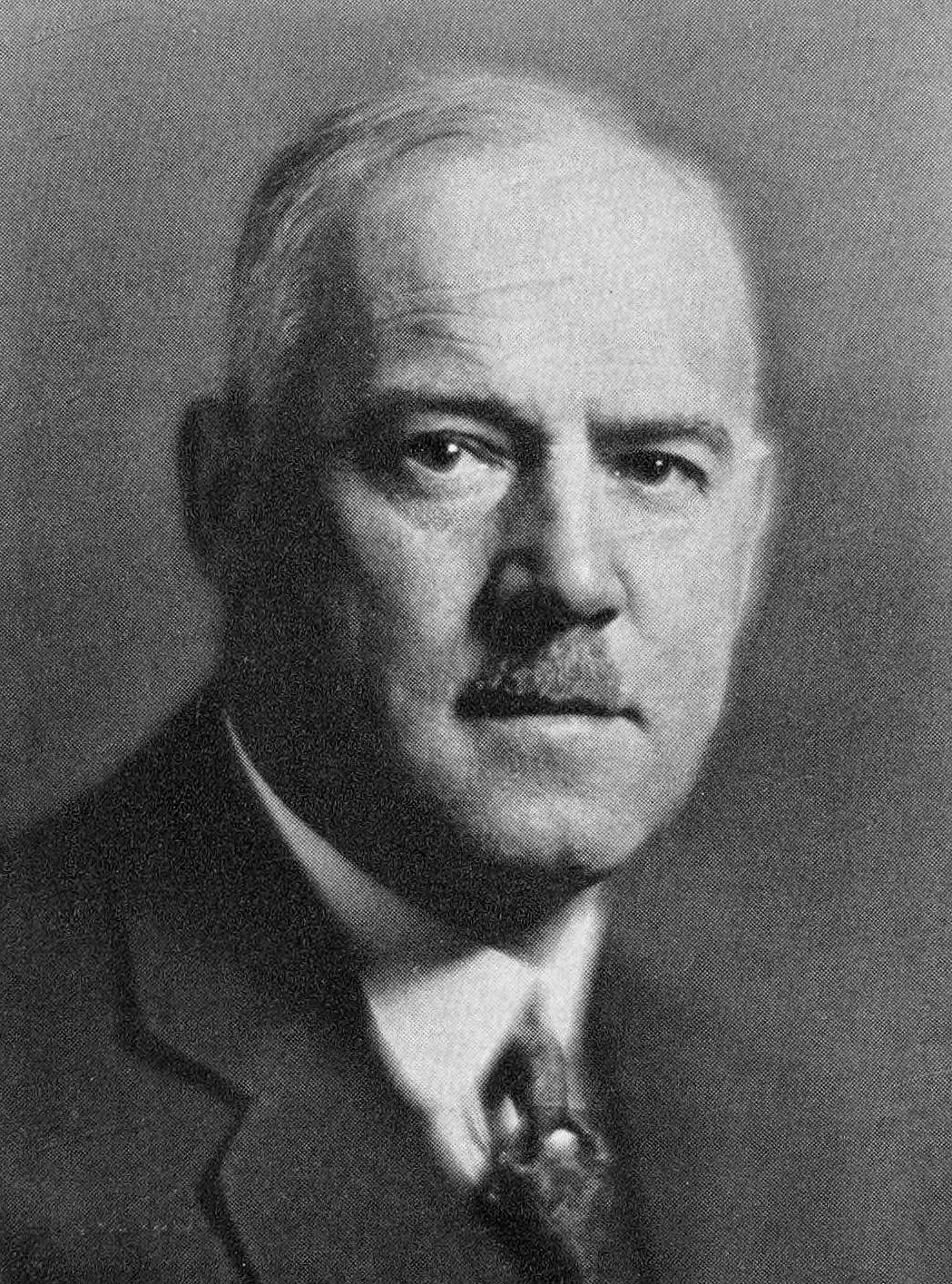
- Benjamin P. Watson
- Born: 4 January 1880; Anstruther, Scotland
- Died: 7 August 1976 (aged 96); Danbury, Connecticut, U.S.
- Education: Waid Academy; University of Edinburgh
- Occupations: Professor of obstetrics and gynecology
- Medical career
- Institutions: University of Edinburgh; University of Toronto; Columbia University
- Awards: Ettles Scholarship

Benjamin Philip Watson FRCSEd, FRCOG, FACS (4 January 1880 – 7 August 1976) was a Scottish obstetrician and gynaecologist who was the head of academic departments in three countries. He was professor and departmental head successively in Canada, Scotland and the United States. In each of these posts he made undergraduate teaching a priority and reformed training in the speciality.

== Early life and training ==
He was born in Anstruther, Scotland on 4 January 1880, the son of David Watson and his wife Elizabeth Clark Watson (née Philp) and was baptised at Anstruther Easter Church on 5 March 1880. He attended the local school Waid Academy and then entered the University of Edinburgh to study medicine. In 1902 he graduated MB ChB with first class honours and the award of the Ettles and Buchanan Scholarships as top student in his year.

Three years later he graduated with the degree of Doctor of Medicine (MD) and was awarded a gold medal for his thesis on amniotic fluid and changes in the placenta following foetal death. In the same year he passed the examinations to become a Fellow of the Royal College of Surgeons of Edinburgh (FRCSEd). One of his examiners was Joseph Bell, the Edinburgh surgeon whom Arthur Conan Doyle (who had been Bell's assistant), used as the model for Sherlock Holmes. Later that year, he was appointed University of Edinburgh tutor in Diseases of Women, a post which he held until 1912. For the last two years of this appointment, he was a lecturer at the extramural School of Medicine of the Royal Colleges of Edinburgh. During this time he wrote Gynaecological Pathology and Diagnosis in collaboration with Alexander H. Freeland Barbour, one of the earliest English-language textbooks devoted exclusively to this subject.

== Career ==
In 1912 Watson accepted an invitation to become Professor of Obstetrics and Gynaecology in the University of Toronto, Canada and Director of both of these departments in the Toronto General Hospital – the first time they had been united under one chief. Here he established Toronto's first dedicated postgraduate program in Obstetrics and Gynaecology and is credited with modernising the residency system at Toronto General Hospital.

During World War I he held the rank of captain in the Royal Canadian Army Medical Corps and served in England, Salonika and Egypt.

Following the retirement of Sir John Halliday Croom from the Edinburgh Chair of Midwifery in 1921, the University of Edinburgh decided to amalgamate its departments of Midwifery and Diseases of Women. Watson was invited to become professor of the combined disciplines and in 1922 he returned to his alma mater. He had gynaecological beds at the Royal Infirmary of Edinburgh and obstetric beds at the Simpson Memorial Maternity Hospital. He radically reorganised the academic department and the teaching of obstetrics and gynaecology but soon found that 'long-established tradition was very hard to fight against' and became frustrated with resistance to his proposals. Four years later he resigned.

In 1926 Watson again crossed the Atlantic, having accepted an invitation to become Professor of Obstetrics and Gynaecology at Columbia University, New York and Director of the Sloane Hospital for Women in New York City. He held these appointments for the next 20 years.

His department became known for its academic training, such that nine of his pupils and assistants went on to occupy university chairs in Great Britain, in Canada and the United States.

== Honours and distinctions ==
During his time as professor in Edinburgh he was president of the Edinburgh Obstetrical Society. He was a Fellow of the American College of Surgeons, a foundation Fellow of the Royal College of Obstetricians and Gynaecologists and in 1936 was elected President of the American Gynecological Society (since 1981 American Gynecological and Obstetrical Society). In 1948 he was elected to President of the New York Academy of Medicine. The University of Edinburgh in 1951 awarded him the Honorary Doctorate of Laws (LLD).

== Family and later life ==
He married Angele Celestine Hamendt on 16 June 1917 in Toronto, Ontario. They had two children. He died at his home in Danbury, Connecticut on 7 August 1976.

Academic offices
Preceded by John Halliday Croom	Professor of Midwifery and Gynaecology, Edinburgh; 1922-1926	Succeeded by Robert William Johnstone
