= Yushkov =

Yushkov (Russian: Юшков) is a Russian masculine surname, its feminine counterpart is Yushkova. It may refer to

- Aleksei Yushkov (1967–1996), Russian football player
- Angelina Yushkova (born 1979), Russian gymnast
- Ivan Yushkov (born 1981), Russian shot putter
- Pavel Yushkov (born 1979), Russian football player
