= Current Reviews in Obstetrics and Gynaecology =

Book series about obstetrics and gynaecology

- Edited by: Tom Lind, Albert Singer, and Joseph A. Jordan
- Country: Scotland, United Kingdom
- Language: English
- Discipline: Nonfiction/medicine
- Publisher: Churchill Livingstone
- Published: 1982–1989
- Media type: Print
- No. of books: 13
- OCLC: 731470434

Current Reviews in Obstetrics and Gynaecology, also spelled Current Reviews in Obstetrics and Gynecology, is a book series on obstetrics and gynecology which was edited by Tom Lind, Albert Singer, and Joseph A. Jordan and was published by Churchill Livingstone in the 1980s. Its International Standard Serial Number (ISSN) is 0264-5610.

== Volumes ==
- Volume 1: Obstetric Analgesia and Anaesthesia (Selwyn Crawford, 1982)
- Volume 2: Early Diagnosis of Fetal Defects (Brock, 1982)
- Volume 3: Early Teenage Pregnancy (Russell, 1982)
- Volume 4: Ovarian Malignancies: The Clinical Care of Adults and Adolescents (Piver & Scully, 1983)
- Volume 5: Cancer of the Cervix: Diagnosis and Treatment (Shingleton & Orr, 1983)
- Volume 6: Aspects of Care in Labour (Beazley & Lobb, 1983)
- Volume 7: Drug Prescribing in Pregnancy (Krauer, Krauer, & Hytten, 1984)
- Volume 8: Spontaneous Abortion (Huisjes, 1984)
- Volume 9: Female Puberty and Its Abnormalities (Dewhurst, 1984)
- Volume 10: Coagulation Problems During Pregnancy (Letsky, 1985)
- Volume 11: Infertility in the Male (Jequier, 1986)
- Volume 12: Endometriosis (O'Connor, 1987)
- Volume 13: Diabetic Pregnancy (Brudenell & Doddridge, 1989)
