= Stroganoff (disambiguation) =

Stroganoff usually refers to beef Stroganoff, a Russian sautéed beef dish with sauce.

Stroganoff may also refer to:

- Stroganov family, a Russian noble family
- Stroganoff Madonna
- Alexander Grigorievich Stroganoff
- Elisabeth Alexandrovna Stroganoff
- Vasili Vasilievich Stroganoff
