= Robert Milne Murray =

Scottish surgeon and medical author

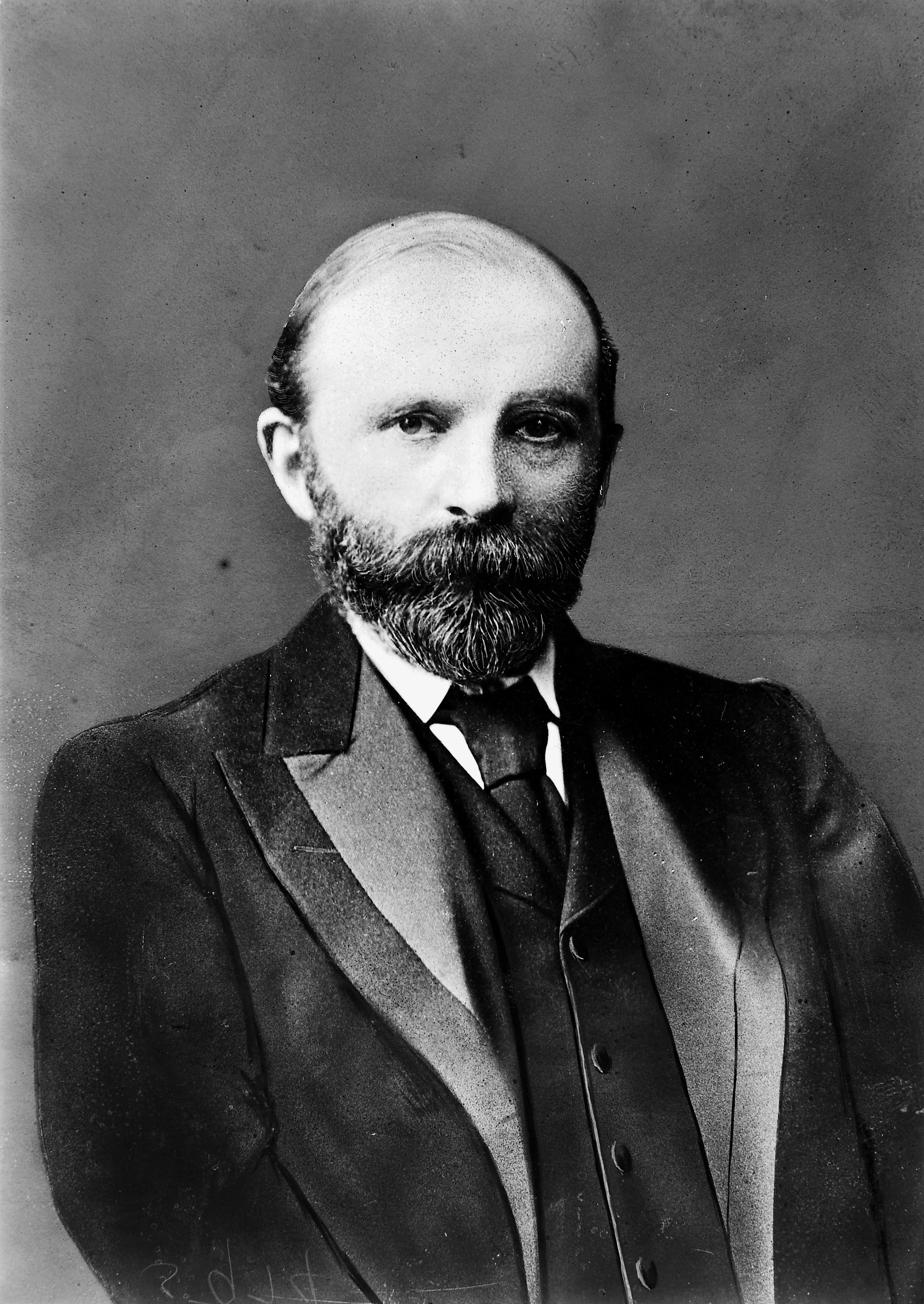
Robert Milne Murray

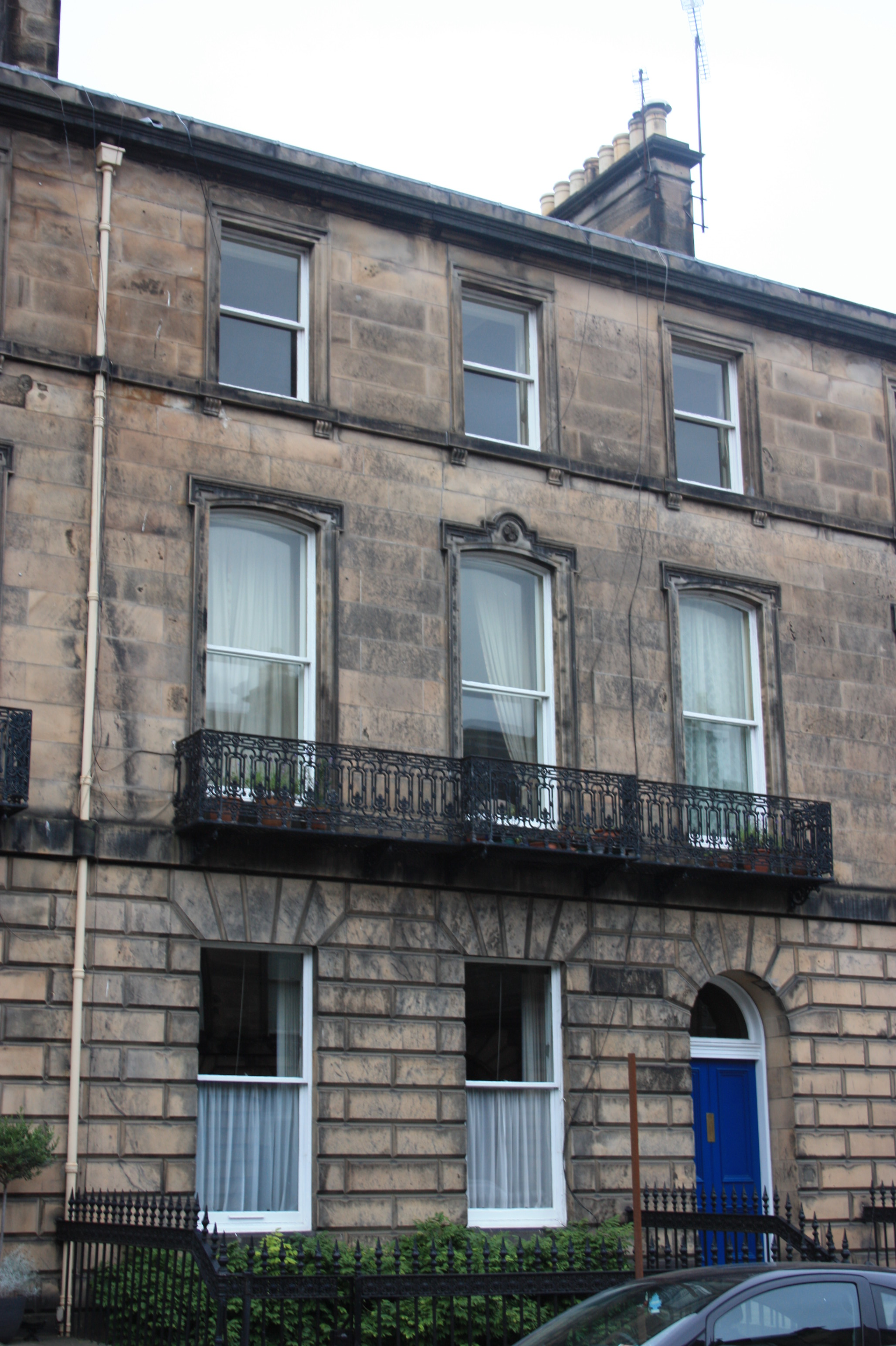
13 Chester Street, Edinburgh

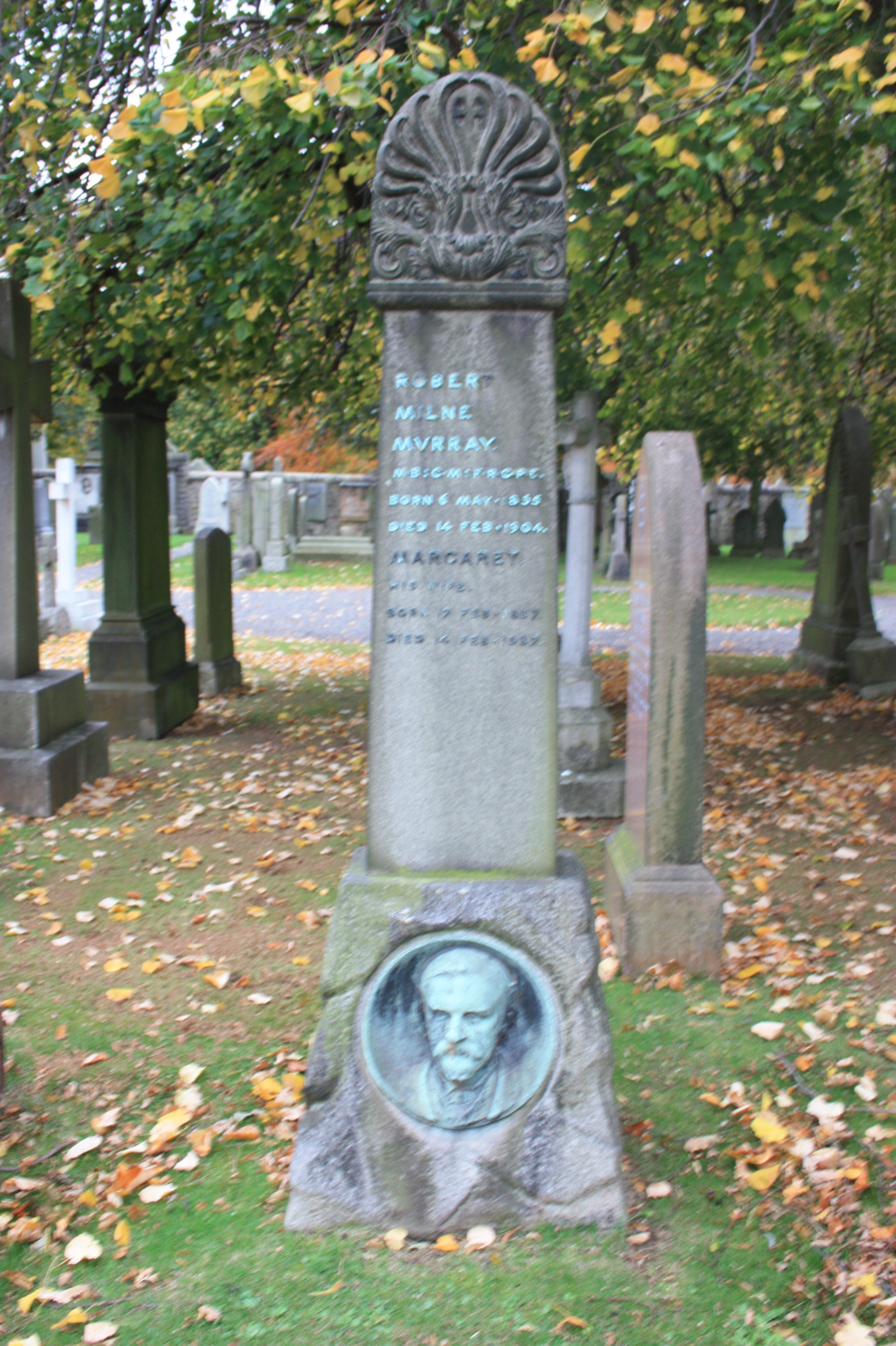
The grave of Robert Milne Murray, Dean Cemetery, Edinburgh

Robert Milne Murray FRSE FRCPE FRSSA (6 May 1855 – 14 February 1904) was a Scottish surgeon and medical author. Specialising in gynaecology he ran the Edinburgh Maternity Hospital and Simpson Memorial Hospital, He was the first medical Electrician at the Edinburgh Royal Infirmary but refused to patent any of the devices which he created and instead openly showed the apparatus to vising European colleagues to be freely copied.

== Life ==
He was born at Fettercairn on 6 May 1855 the son of the local schoolmaster.

He studied science at the University of St Andrews graduating with an MA around 1875. After some time assisting Prof Matthew Forster Heddle he went to the University of Edinburgh to study medicine graduating with an MB ChB in 1879. He then became assistant to John Halliday Croom under whom he gained much knowledge in the field of obstetrics and gynaecology.

In 1886 he began lecturing in midwifery and diseases of women. He was President of the Gynaecological Society of Edinburgh and Vice President of the British Gynaecological Society. He was Vice President of the Royal Scottish Society of the Arts. He maintained a private laboratory at Rutland Square.

In 1888 he was elected a Fellow of the Royal Society of Edinburgh. His proposers were Sir Thomas Richard Fraser, Alexander Crum Brown, Sir John Batty Tuke and William Evans Hoyle. In 1898 he was elected a member of the Harveian Society of Edinburgh.

His final years were spent at 13 Chester Street in Edinburgh's West End, a mid-terraced Victorian townhouse.

He contracted pneumonia following a severe chill in November 1902. Despite retiring from active work and spending time in a Mediterranean climate the pneumonia remained. On 14 February 1904 he underwent an operation to adjust his ribs in an attempt to relieve his breathing. He died of a heart attack whilst under the anaesthetic aged 48.

He was buried in Dean Cemetery on 18 February 1904. The grave lies on the northern path of the first north extension, on the edge of the north-west section.

== Family ==
He was married to Margaret (1857 – 1937), they did not have any children.

== Publications ==
- Chemical Notes and Equations (1880)
- Post-Partum Incontinence of Urine (1881)
- Cessation of Respiration under Chloroform and its Restoration (1885)
- Physiological and Therapeutic Actions of Water at Different Temperatures (1886)
- Effects of Compression on the Shape of the Fetal Head (1888)
- Treatment of Pelvic Disease by Electricity (1890)
- The Axis Traction Forceps (1896)
- Deflection and Rotation of the Pregnant Uterus (1897)
- Relative Advantages of Forceps and Version (1896)
- Spontaneous Rupture of Uterus
