= Margaret Myles =

Scottish midwife (1892–1988)

Margaret (Maggie) Fraser Myles, née Findlay, (December 1892 - February 1988) was a Scottish midwife, midwifery tutor and lecturer and author. She is globally known for her Textbook for Midwives, first published in 1953, which has been considered a reference midwifery textbook for decades.

== Early years ==
Myles was born on 30 December 1892 in Aberdeen, Scotland, to Robert Fraser Findlay, a house painter, and Mary, née McDougall. After finishing her secondary education, she emigrated to Canada where she found training at a small Hospital in Yorktown, Saskatchewan as a nurse. While there, she married Charles James Myles in 1920 and they had a son, Ian in 1921. He was a farmer and army officer during World War I, who died shortly after the birth of their son. After her husband's passing, she proceeded to return to Scotland with Ian, where they lived with her parents as she worked as a nurse in rural Aberdeen. Soon after their move, she lost her son to pneumonia in 1924.

== Career ==
After the loss of her son, Myles left her position as a district nurse at Alford, Aberdeenshire and decided to re-train as a Registered General Nurse at the Royal Infirmary of Edinburgh from 1924-1927. Following this time, the hospital where she received her initial training in (Yorkton), Canada invited her back as a matron. Myles proceeded to continue her education at McGill University, studying education in nursing, later receiving appointment as a senior tutor at the Postgraduate Hospital in Philadelphia and the director of midwifery education of the Women's Hospital, Detroit.

In 1935, Margaret moved back to London where she worked at City Road Hospital before continuing to further her education. Later in 1937, Myles received a Midwife Teacher's Diploma from and became the midwifery tutor to the new Simson Memorial Maternity Pavilion in the Scottish capital, where she practiced until her retirement in 1954. Additionally, she served as the examinar to the Central Midwives Board and helped to educate many others in the field.

== Writing career ==
During her career as a nurse and educator, Myles contributed as an author to various academic journals in Britain, Canada and the United States. She also wrote a book on how to care for babies, intended for school children. Before her retirement, Margaret Myles published a culmination of her work Textbook for Midwives which she continued revising and presenting for the education of others until her death.

=== Textbook for Midwives ===
Myles most seminal piece of writing has been her Textbook for Midwives, firstly published by Churchill Livingston in 1953. Although the book was published one year before her retirement, having had recognised a gap in midwifery education, Myles had started working on it since her tutor years. The book has been identified as Book of the Year as part of the seventy-fifth anniversary celebrations of the American Journal of Nursing. Myles Textbook for Midwives has been translated in many languages and is currently sold around the world, with its seventeen edition to be published in 2020. Out of these editions, Myles herself worked on ten revisions between 1952 and 1985, updating the content with the latest best practices and developments and removing obsolete knowledge and practice.

=== Later career and death ===
Following her retirement from practice, Myles continued to visit and lecture at midwifery schools and obstetric units around the world, including the United Kingdom, the United States, Canada, Africa, Australia and New Zealand. Although having turned down many awards for honours and honorary appointments in her career, in 1978, she received an Honorary Fellowship of the Edinburgh Obstetrical Society. She died at Banchory, Kincardineshire in 1988, leaving a large legacy of midwifery experience and education behind her.
