= Robert Bowes Malcolm =

British physician

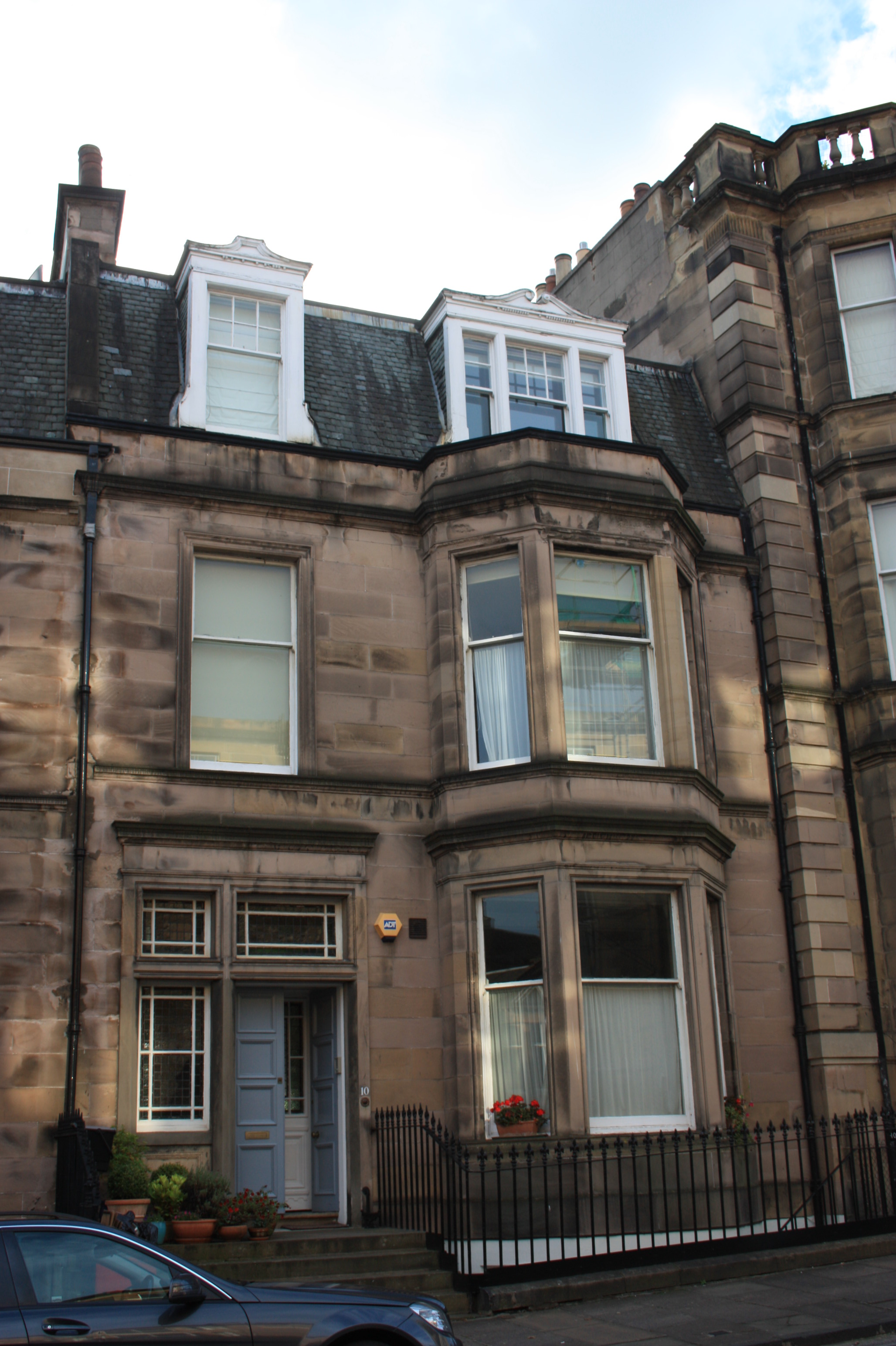
10 Rosebery Crescent, Edinburgh

Dr Robert Bowes Malcolm FRSE FRCPE (25 August 1807 – 6 June 1894) was a British physician. He was President of the Harveian Society 1856/7 and President of the Royal Physical Society of Edinburgh. He founded the Edinburgh Obstetrical Society. In an unusual secondary role he was official physician to Fettes College.

== Life ==
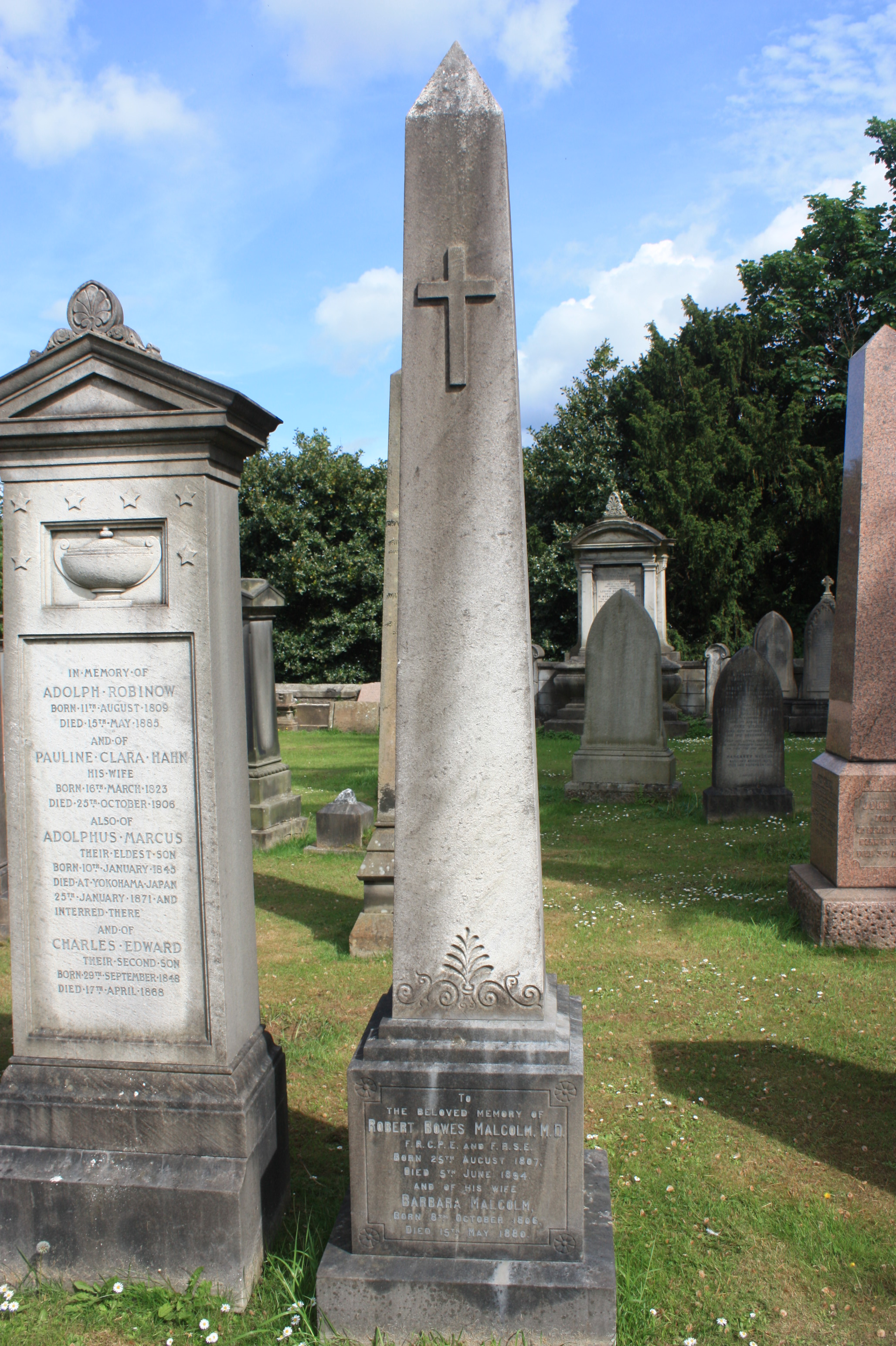
The grave of Dr Robert Bowes Malcolm, Dean Cemetery, Edinburgh

He was born on 25 August 1807 the eldest son of Major John Malcolm of the East India Company. Early years were spent at Haughton-le-Skerne in County Durham. He studied medicine at the University of Edinburgh gaining his doctorate (MD) in 1831. In 1840 he was elected a Fellow of the Royal College of Physicians of Edinburgh.

In 1841 he was elected a member of the Aesculapian Club. In 1843 Malcolm was elected a member of the Harveian Society of Edinburgh and served as president in 1856. He was elected a Fellow of the Royal Society of Edinburgh in 1857. His proposer was William Swan.

He died on at home, 10 Roseberry Crescent in Edinburgh's West End on 6 June 1894. He was buried on 9 June in the small central southern sections of Dean Cemetery, facing the main southern path.

== Family ==
In May 1832 he was married to Barbara Thatcher (1806–1880). She was the eldest daughter of Dr John Thatcher of 23 Elder Street in Edinburgh. Their children included John Vicary Thatcher Malcolm. They also had three daughters, including Eleanor Bowes Malcolm (born 1835). The children were painted by Mary Ann Heaphy.
