= Klavdiya Kildisheva =

Russian aviation engineer (1917–1994)

- Клавдия Кильдишева
- Born: Klavdiya Sergeyevna Kildisheva; 6 March 1917; Vyazma, Smolensk Governorate, Russian Empire
- Died: 2 May 1994 (aged 77); Moscow, Russia
- Occupation: Test engineer

Klavdiya Sergeyevna Kildisheva (Russian: Клавдия Сергеевна Кильдишева; 6 March 1917 – 2 May 1994) was a Soviet and Russian test and aerospace engineer. She was awarded the Hero of Socialist Labour medal in 1981, the highest degree of distinction in the USSR for exceptional achievements in Soviet industry and culture.

== Biography ==
Kildisheva was born in Vyazma to a railroad worker. She finished school in 1934 and went on to study at the Moscow University in the Mechanical - Mathematical Faculty. Kildisheva graduated in 1940 and went on to work in Moscow in the experimental design office Andrei Tupolev completing strength calculations for aircraft. She moved to the A.S. Yakovlev Experimental Design Bureau in 1941, which had been formed in 1934 under designer Alexander Sergeyevich Yakovlev.

She joined the Communist Party of the Soviet Union and from 1943 to 1946 she was the chair of the trade union committee for the war. Afterwards, in 1946, Kildisheva took up a position as deputy-chief of the laboratory for aircraft static tests. In 1949 she became deputy head and then in 1953 head of the research department of the Yakovlev OKB-115. In 1966 she was promoted to deputy head designer for research work. She worked on the ground tests for the Second World War and early Cold War era Yakovlev Yak-9 fighter aircraft to the three-engined mid-range Yakovlev Yak-42 passenger jet developed in the mid-1970s. Kildisheva retired in 1982 as a pensioner of national importance. She died in Moscow, and was buried at the Kotlyakovsky Cemetery.

== Awards ==
- Hero of Socialist Labour (1981)
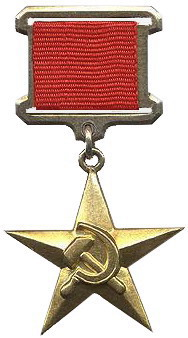
  Hero of Socialist Labour medal
- Two Orders of Lenin (1966, 1981)
- Lenin Prize (1972)
- USSR State Prize (1977)
- Order of the Red Banner of Labor (1957)
- Order of the Badge of Honour (1945)
