= Vyazma =

Town in Smolensk Oblast, Russia

Vyazma Вязьма
- Town
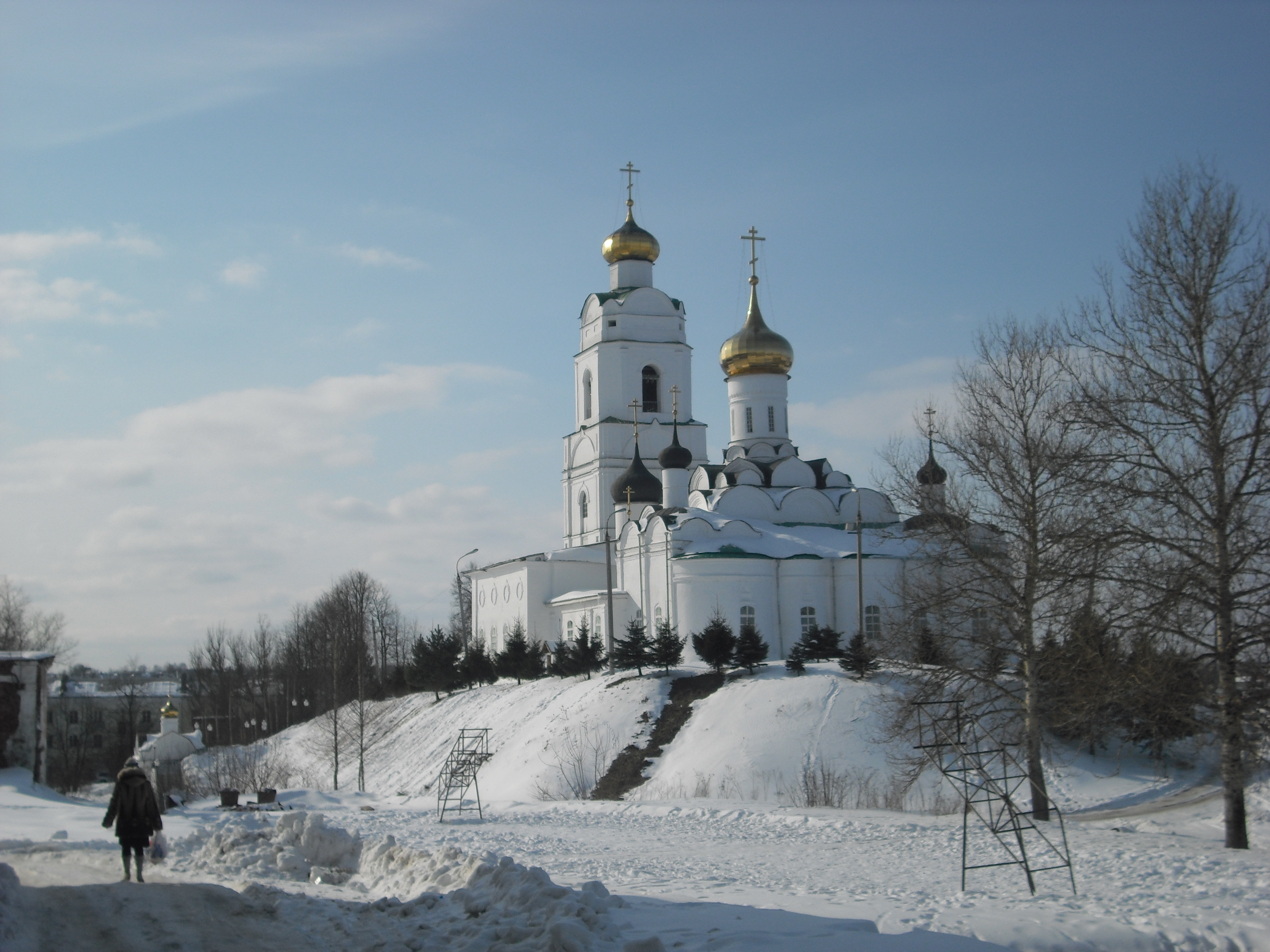
- Trinity Cathedral

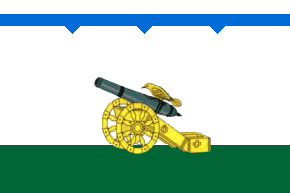
- Flag Coat of arms
- Interactive map of Vyazma
- Location of Vyazma Vyazma (Smolensk Oblast)
- Coordinates: 55.2107°N 34.2912°E
- Country: Russia
- Federal subject: Smolensk Oblast
- Administrative district: Vyazemsky District
- First mentioned: 1230

Area
  - Total: 48.58 km^{2} (18.76 sq mi)
- Elevation: 240 m (790 ft)

Population (2010 Census)
  - Total: 57,101
  - Estimate (2025): 49,932 (−12.6%)
  - Rank: 288th in 2010
  - Density: 1,175/km^{2} (3,044/sq mi)

Administrative status
  - Capital of: Vyazemsky District, Vyazemskoye Urban Settlement

Municipal status
  - Municipal district: Vyazemsky Municipal District
  - Urban settlement: Vyazemskoye Urban Settlement
  - Capital of: Vyazemsky Municipal District, Vyazemskoye Urban Settlement
- Time zone: UTC+3 (MSK)
- Postal codes: 215110, 215111, 215113, 215116, 215118, 215119, 215125, 215129, 215169
- Dialing code: +7 48131
- OKTMO ID: 66605101001
- Website: www.mgorv.ru

Vyazma (Russian: Вязьма) is a town and the administrative center of Vyazemsky District in Smolensk Oblast, Russia, located on the Vyazma River, about halfway between Smolensk, the administrative center of the oblast, and Mozhaysk. Throughout its turbulent history, it helped defend Russia against invasions from the west aimed at Moscow. Population: 57,101 (2010 census); 57,545 (2002 census); 59,022 (1989 Soviet census); 44,000 (1970).

== Etymology ==
The town is named after the Vyazma River, whose name is derived from the Russian word vyaz' (вязь), meaning 'bog' or 'swamp'.

== History ==
=== Early history ===
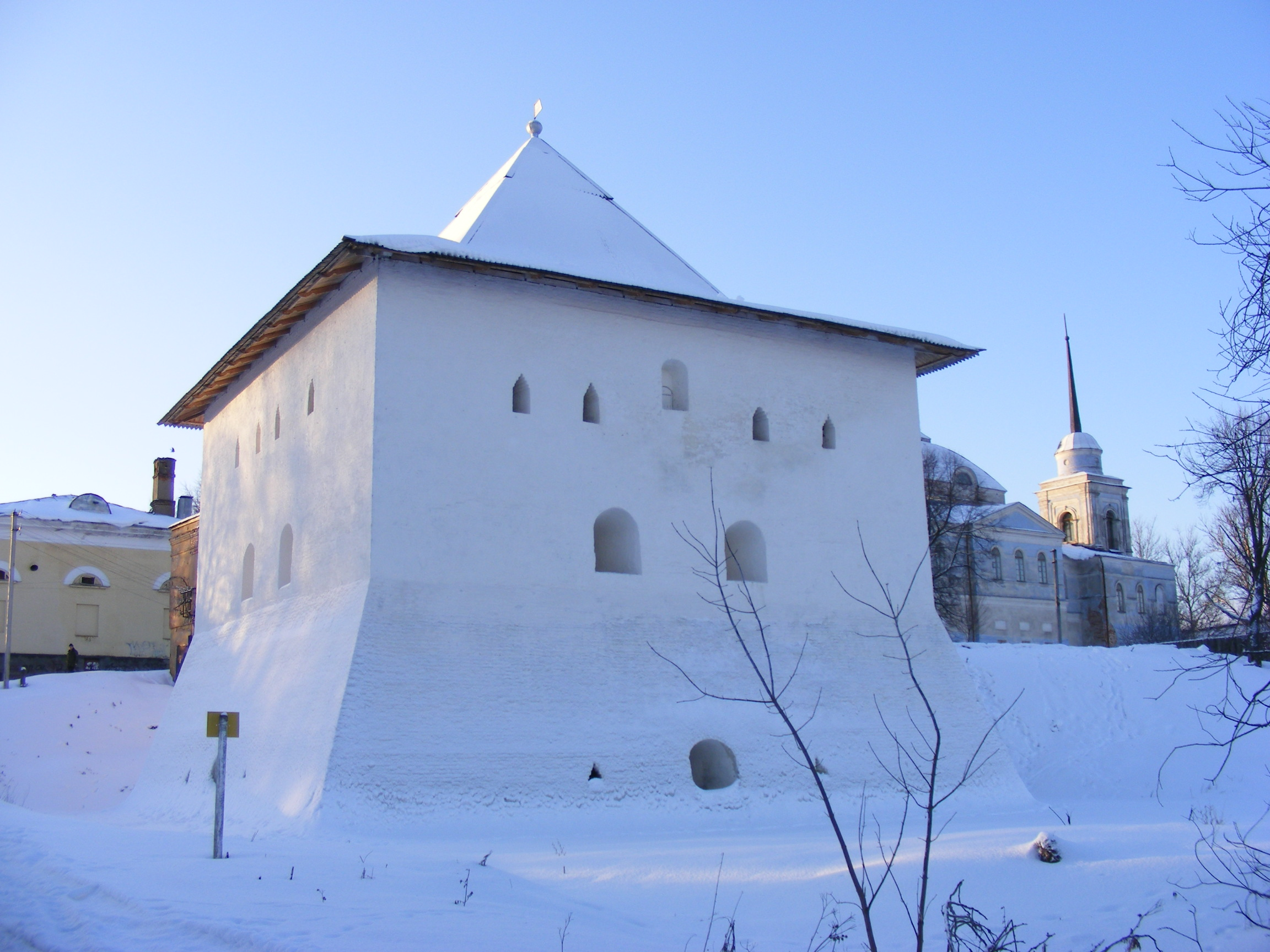
Spasskaya Tower is the only tower left of the medieval Vyazma Kremlin.

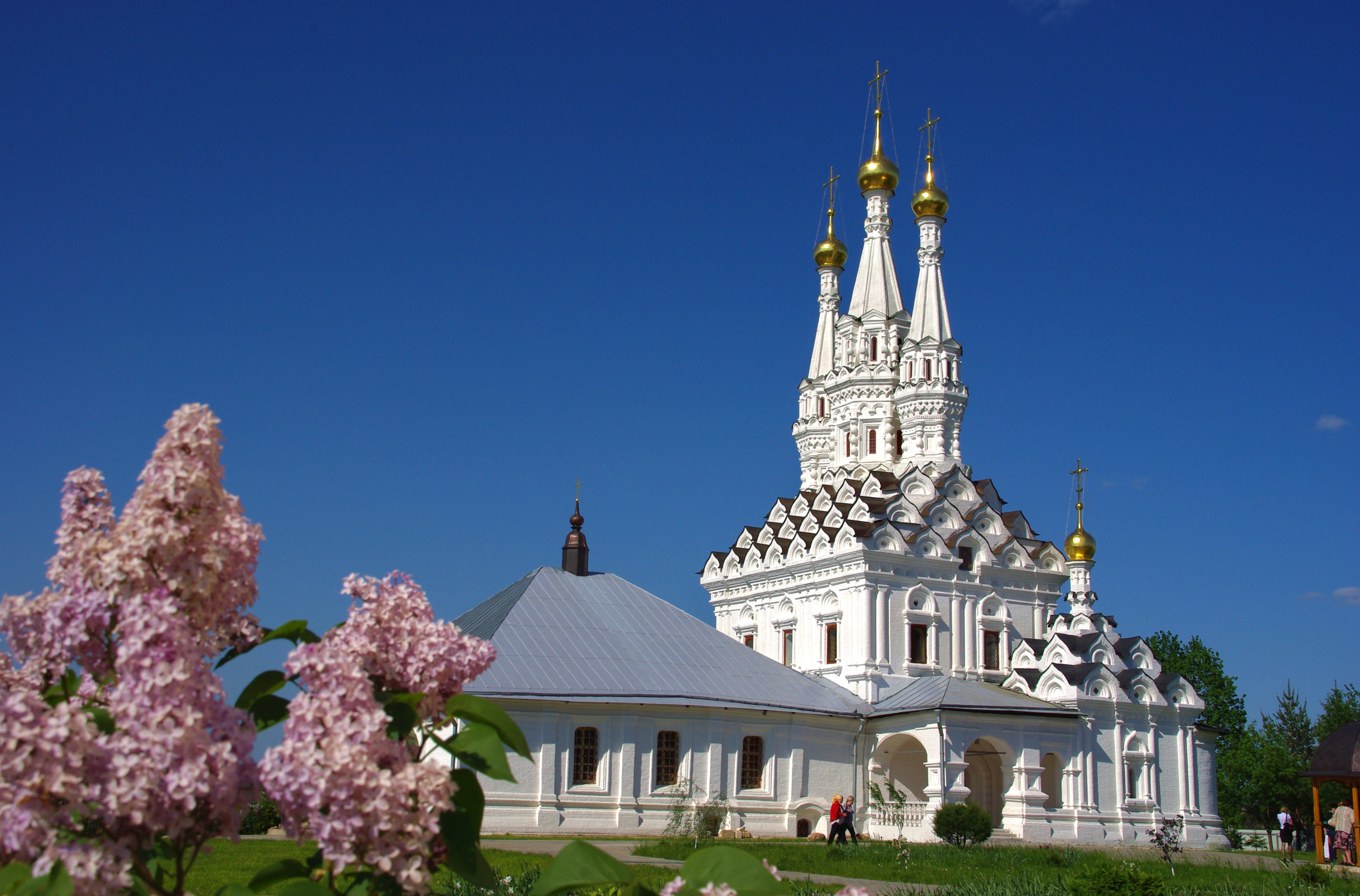
Church of the Hodegetria is one of three major three-tented churches in the world, the other two being in Uglich and Moscow.

The territory around Vyazma was rapidly developed during the early and mid-12th century. A fortified settlement was built sometime in the late 12th or early 13th century. Vyazma is first mentioned in Russian chronicles under the year 1230, when it was given as an appanage to Andrey Vladimirovich ("Dolgoruky"). The town became an important administrative center within the Principality of Smolensk.

During the 13th and 14th centuries, Vyazma developed as a center of trade and crafts. At the same time, the town belonged to a lateral branch of the Rurikid dynasty of Smolensk, and carried on a lively trade with Narva on the Gulf of Finland. From the late 13th century, Vyazma was the center of a separate appanage principality.

However, in 1403, the local princes were expelled by the Lithuanians to Moscow, where they became service princes and took the name Vyazemsky. The most notable among their descendants were Pyotr Vyazemsky, a close friend of the poet Alexander Pushkin and a poet himself, and Anne Wiazemsky, a French writer who was married to Jean-Luc Godard for a time.

Vyazma belonged to Lithuania until 1494, when it was captured by a Russian army under the command of Daniil Shchenya. A peace treaty was signed the same year, and Vyazma was recognized as a possession of the Grand Principality of Moscow, which had become a centralized Russian state. During the Time of Troubles in the early 17th century, the town was repeatedly devastated. The Treaty of Deulino, signed between Poland–Lithuania and Russia in 1618, recognized Vyazma as belonging to the Russian state.

Two important abbeys were embellished with stone churches, including a rare three-tented church dedicated to Our Lady of Smolensk (Hodegetria) and consecrated in 1638. A barbican church of the same abbey dates back to 1656, and the town's cathedral was completed by 1676. Other churches are designed mostly in baroque style.

A kremlin (fortress) wall was built from 1631 to 1634 and reinforced with six towers. One of the towers, the Spasskaya Tower, has survived to this day. During the Russo-Polish War of 1654–1667, Vyazma served as the main strategic stronghold for the struggle for Smolensk. Tsar Alexis of Russia resided in the town during the winter of 1654–1655 due to the spread of bubonic plague.

From 1708 to 1713 and again from 1726 to 1929, Vyazma was part of Smolensk Governorate as the center of an uyezd. It was part of Riga Governorate from 1713 to 1726. By 1760, Vyazma had the largest number of merchants in the governorate.

=== French invasion of Russia ===
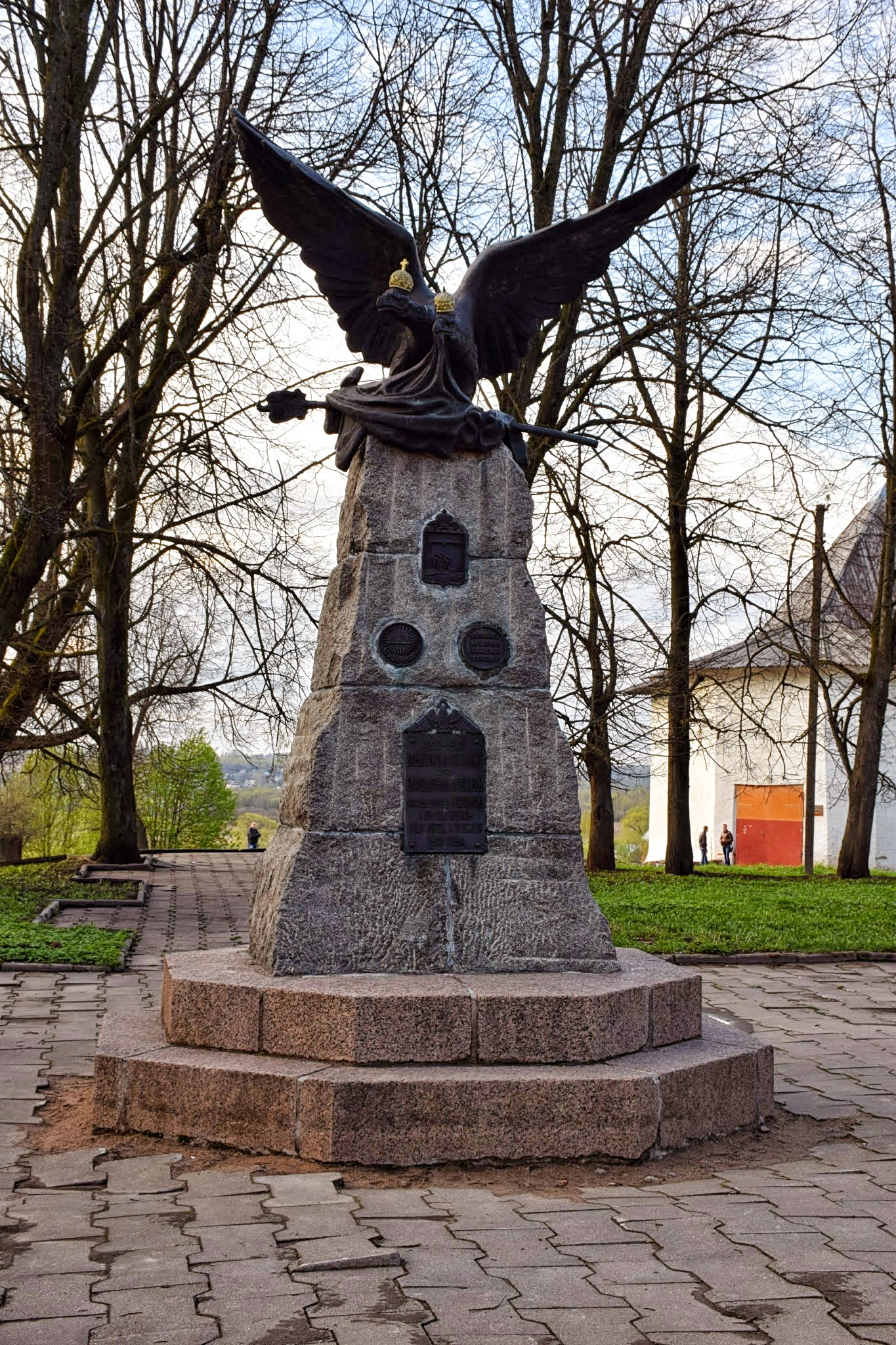
Vyazma monument commemorating the Russian victory over Napoleon

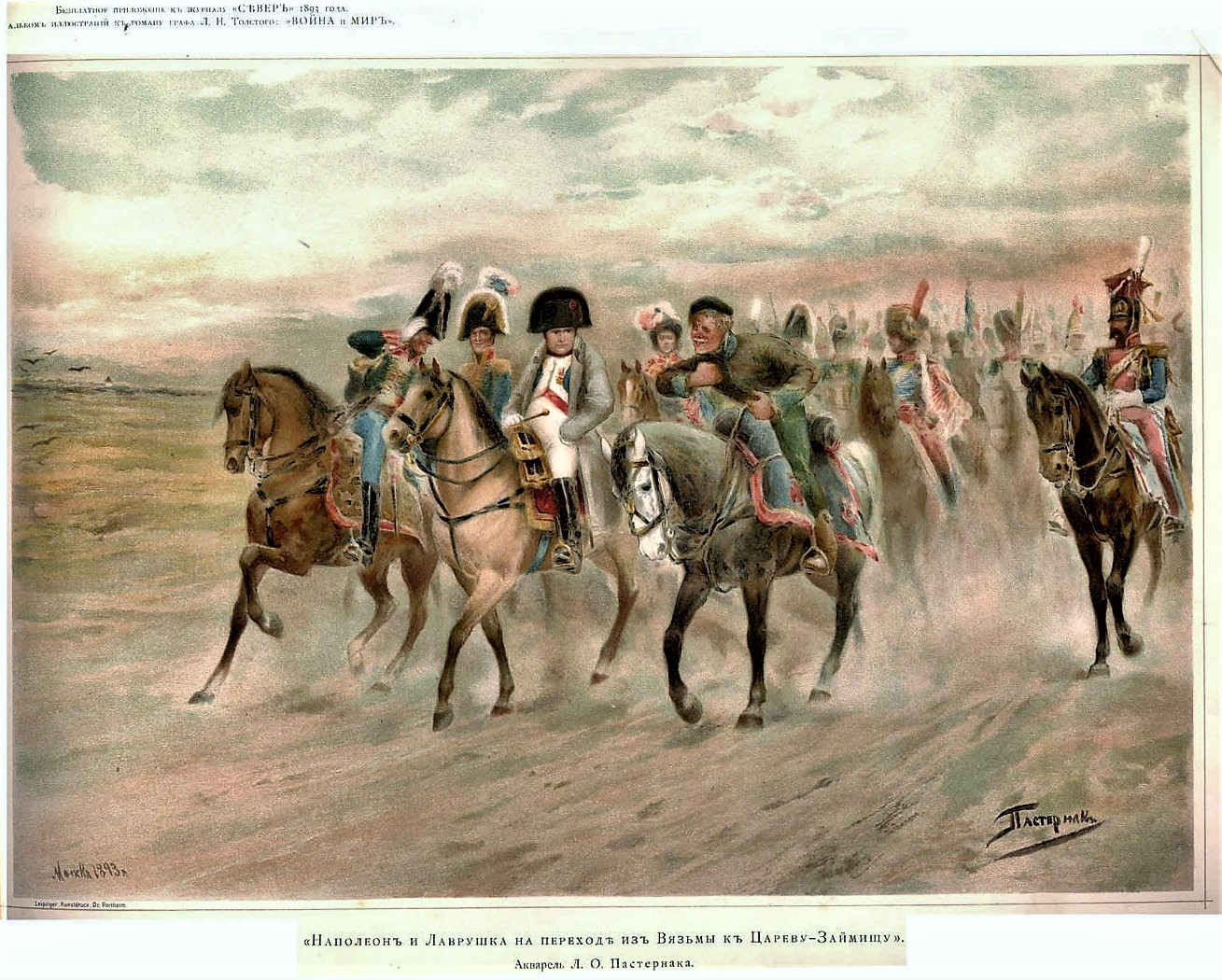
An illustration by Leonid Pasternak for War and Peace, showing Napoleon near Vyazma

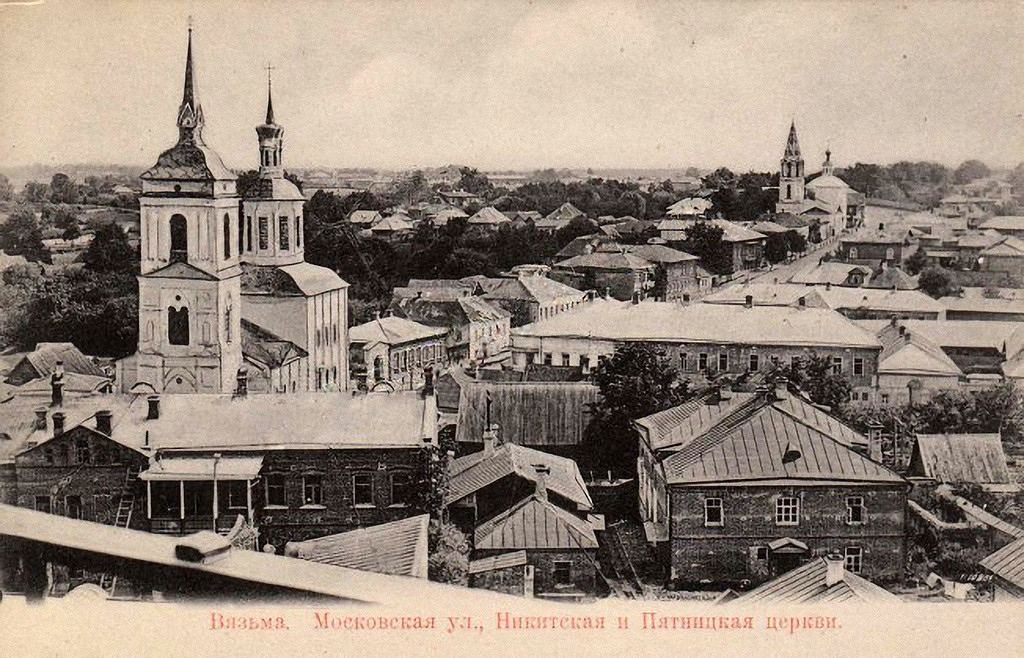
Vyazma in 1910

During the French invasion of Russia in 1812, there was a battle between the retreating French army (up to 37,000 troops) and the Russian army (25,000 men) near Vyazma on 22 October 1812. The vanguard of the Russian army under the command of Lieutenant General Mikhail Miloradovich and a Cossack unit under the command of General Matvey Platov (coordinated by Miloradovich) attacked the rear-guard corps of Marshal Louis-Nicolas Davout east of Vyazma and cut off his retreat. Owing to the intervention of Eugène de Beauharnais and Józef Poniatowski, Davout managed to break through the Russian army's encirclement.

However, the French army's attempts to hold the heights near Vyazma and the town itself were unsuccessful. By the evening of 22 October, Russians seized Vyazma, which had been set on fire by the French. The French lost 6,000 men during the battle; 2,500 soldiers were taken prisoners. The Russians lost around 2,000 men.

=== World War II ===
In 1941, during World War II, Vyazma was the scene of a battle of encirclement. The Soviet 16th, 19th, 20th and 24th armies were surrounded west of the town by the 3rd and 4th Panzer armies.

Vyazma was occupied by German forces between 7 October 1941 and 12 March 1943. In October 1941, 11 Jews were shot in the town and two were hanged. In December 1941, 117 Jews were killed in a mass execution perpetrated by the Einsatzgruppe B.

The town was heavily damaged in the fighting, then rebuilt after the war. U.S. journalist Quentin Reynolds, of Collier's Weekly, visited Vyazma shortly after the German withdrawal in 1943 and gave an account of the destruction in his book The Curtain Rises (1944), in which he stated that the town's population was reduced from 60,000 to 716, with only three buildings remaining. The Nazis also established two concentration camps in the town, Dulag 184 and Dulag 230. About 80,000 people died there and were buried in mass graves. The victims included Jews, political officers, and POWs.

The transfer camp (Dulag No. 184) was established in October 1941 and lasted until March 1943, when the city was liberated by Soviet troops. The camp housed prisoners who had been captured by German soldiers, in particular, conscripted from Zubtsovsky, Rzhevsky, Nelidovsky and other districts of the Tver region, natives of the Smolensk and Arkhangelsk regions, who were reported missing, as well as volunteer militias from Moscow. Prisoners were often not fed or given water. In the winter of 1941–1942, the death rate in the camp was up to 300 people per day. According to SMERSH, there are 5,500 people on the list of dead from wounds in the camp. There are 40 (according to other data, 45) ditches measuring 4×100 meters, in an area equal to about four football fields, where, according to various data, 70 to 80,000 people are buried. As of 2009, the graves house gardens, garages of local residents, a machine-building plant and the Vyazemsky meat-processing plant, in the building of which the camp was housed.

In another transit prison in Vyazma (Dulag No. 230) in October 1941, during an inspection conducted by an officer, Abver found 200 Jews and 50 to 60 politruki (political commissars), a few days later another 40 Jews and 6–8 politruki were found there. They were all shot. In December, 117 Jews were identified and executed at a POW camp in Vyazma.

According to the memoirs of the future Soviet historian, Mikhail Markovich Sheinman, who was in German captivity at the time:

In early October 1941, near Vyazma, the sector in which I served was surrounded. We immediately found ourselves in the Germans' rear. On 12 October, I was shot in the leg while attacking. From November 1941 to 12 February 1942, I was in the Vyazma "hospital" for prisoners of war. People were placed in dilapidated buildings without roofs, windows, or doors. Often many of those who went to bed did not wake up – they froze. In Vyazma, exhausted, ragged, barely clad people – Soviet prisoners of war – the Germans drove to unbearably hard work. Few people got into the "hospital" – most of them died in the camp.

In Vyazma, the hospital was housed in dilapidated, abandoned houses, on the outskirts of the city in the ruins of the oil factory buildings. The cabins were always cold and dark. The wounded lay on the bare floor. There wasn't even straw for bedding. It was not until the end of my stay in Vyazma that bunks were built in the houses, but on them the sick lay without straw, on bare boards. There were no medicines. The lice in the hospital was incredible. I never had a bath in the three and a half months of my stay in Vyazma.

In honor of the Soviet defenders, a memorial complex has been erected on the Moscow–Minsk highway outside the city. In 2009, in the vicinity of Vyazma, a memorial named "The Virgin Field" was opened. The burial ground, where tens of thousands of people died in the death camp, is buried in the territory of the existing meat-processing plant, now marked chapel in memory of the dead prisoners of war.

== Administrative and municipal status ==
Within the framework of administrative divisions, Vyazma serves as the administrative center of Vyazemsky District. As an administrative division, it is incorporated within Vyazemsky District as Vyazemskoye Urban Settlement. As a municipal division, this administrative unit also has urban settlement status and is a part of Vyazemsky Municipal District.

== Economy ==
The town's main industries in the present day are engineering, leather working, graphite products, and flax textiles.

Historically the town was known for its pryaniki, which are even mentioned in classical works of Russian literature. The original recipe, as well as the technology and knowledge, were lost during the revolutionary period. Attempts to resurrect the pryanik industry during the Soviet period were unsuccessful, but in post-Soviet times, the local Vyazma (industrial) bakery (Russian: Вяземский хлебокомбинат) started once again to produce hand-made pryaniki, some of which were awarded prizes in national competitions.

== Transportation ==
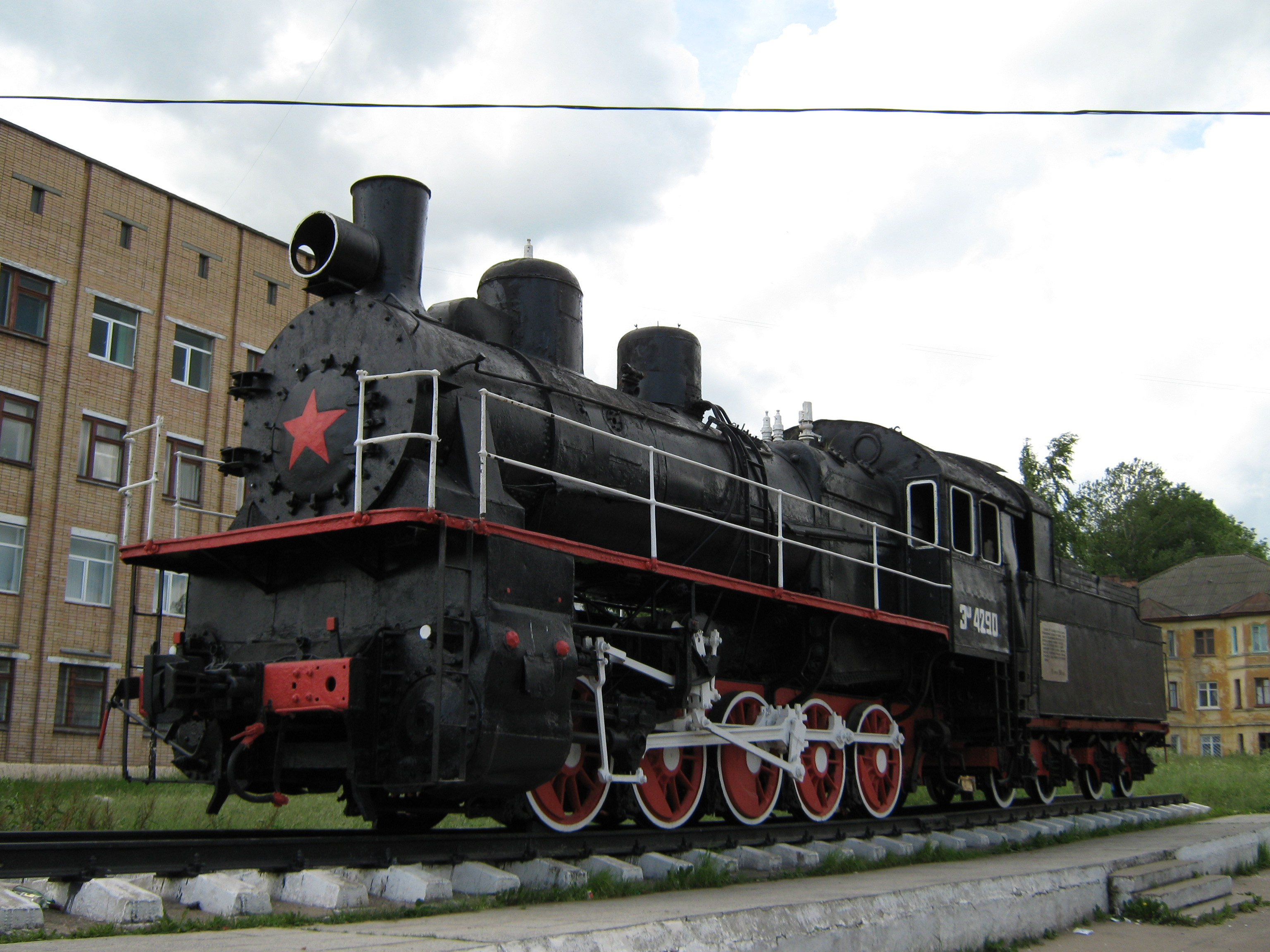
Esh 4290 0-10-0 steam locomotive outside the Vyazma railway station.

Vyazma is a major railway junction for both freight and passenger transport, with connecting trains from Moscow, St. Petersburg, Kaluga, and Bryansk. The long-distance (lastochka) train from Moscow to Smolensk stops at Vyazma, with travel time to and from the capital being between 2 and 2:30 hours. Short-distance trains also go to and from Mozhaysk and Borodino, linking Vyazma to the Moscow suburban railway network.

Vyazma is also located near the main M1 Highway between Moscow and Minsk.

The nearby Vyazma Airport serves military and recreational purposes, but there are no commercial flights to or from the city.

== Education ==
The only university in the city is the Smolensk Cossack Institute of Industrial Technologies and Business, a regional branch of the Kirill Razumovsky Moscow State University of Technology and Management (First Cossack University).

Vyzma also hosts several institutions of tertiary and further education:

- Vyazma Polytechnic College;
- Vyazma Railway College;
- Efrem Mukhin Vyazma Medical College.

== Sports ==
The town's association football club, FC Vyazma, plays in the amateur football league.

The town is known for the aviation-squadron Vyazma Russ which flies in Aero L-39 Albatros jet aircraft.

== Climate ==
Vyazma has a humid continental climate (Köppen climate classification Dfb).

Climate data for Vyazma (extremes 1894–present)
| Month | Jan | Feb | Mar | Apr | May | Jun | Jul | Aug | Sep | Oct | Nov | Dec | Year |
|---|---|---|---|---|---|---|---|---|---|---|---|---|---|
| Record high °C (°F) | 8.7 (47.7) | 8.0 (46.4) | 19.1 (66.4) | 28.2 (82.8) | 31.1 (88.0) | 33.9 (93.0) | 37.9 (100.2) | 38.1 (100.6) | 28.9 (84.0) | 25.0 (77.0) | 15.9 (60.6) | 10.0 (50.0) | 38.1 (100.6) |
| Mean daily maximum °C (°F) | −4.1 (24.6) | −3.2 (26.2) | 2.4 (36.3) | 11.2 (52.2) | 18.1 (64.6) | 21.4 (70.5) | 23.6 (74.5) | 22.1 (71.8) | 16.2 (61.2) | 8.8 (47.8) | 1.4 (34.5) | −2.7 (27.1) | 9.6 (49.3) |
| Daily mean °C (°F) | −6.6 (20.1) | −6.5 (20.3) | −1.5 (29.3) | 6.1 (43.0) | 12.5 (54.5) | 16.0 (60.8) | 18.2 (64.8) | 16.4 (61.5) | 11.1 (52.0) | 5.2 (41.4) | −0.9 (30.4) | −4.9 (23.2) | 5.4 (41.8) |
| Mean daily minimum °C (°F) | −9.3 (15.3) | −9.8 (14.4) | −5.4 (22.3) | 1.2 (34.2) | 6.8 (44.2) | 10.5 (50.9) | 12.8 (55.0) | 11.1 (52.0) | 6.6 (43.9) | 2.0 (35.6) | −3.1 (26.4) | −7.2 (19.0) | 1.3 (34.4) |
| Record low °C (°F) | −41.1 (−42.0) | −37.2 (−35.0) | −34.2 (−29.6) | −21.1 (−6.0) | −5.0 (23.0) | −1.1 (30.0) | 3.0 (37.4) | −1.1 (30.0) | −7.0 (19.4) | −20.0 (−4.0) | −28.0 (−18.4) | −40.0 (−40.0) | −41.1 (−42.0) |
| Average precipitation mm (inches) | 42.6 (1.68) | 35.1 (1.38) | 34.6 (1.36) | 34.0 (1.34) | 66.6 (2.62) | 74.2 (2.92) | 90.7 (3.57) | 77.9 (3.07) | 51.1 (2.01) | 57.6 (2.27) | 47.2 (1.86) | 45.1 (1.78) | 656.7 (25.86) |
Source: pogodaiklimat.ru

== Notable people ==
- Anatoli Papanov (1922–1987), film and theater actor and director
- Boris Almazov (1827–1876), poet, translator and literary critic
- Boris Godunov (1552–1605), first Russian tsar of non-Rurik dynasty, who marked the start of Smuta
- Igor Korobov (1956–2018), chief of GRU
- Klaudia Sergejewna Kildisheva (1917–1994), aviation engineer and Hero of Socialist Labor
- Leonid Teliga (1917–1970), Polish sailor
- Nikolai Plotnikov (1897–1979), film and theater actor
- Pavel Yushkov (born 1979), former Russian professional footballer
- Sergei Davydov (born 1979), football player
- Vasily Stroganov (1858–1938), physician and scientist
