= Churchill Livingstone =

British academic publisher

- Parent company: Elsevier
- Founded: 1971
- Headquarters location: London
- Publication types: Books
- Official website: www.elsevierhealth.com

Churchill Livingstone is an academic publisher.

It was formed in 1971 from the merger of Longman's medical list, E & S Livingstone (Edinburgh, Scotland) and J & A Churchill (London, England) and was owned by Pearson. Harcourt acquired Churchill Livingstone in 1997. It is now integrated as an imprint in Elsevier's health science division after Elsevier acquired Harcourt in 2001.

In the past it published a number of classic medical texts, including Sir William Osler's textbook The Principles and Practice of Medicine, Gray's Anatomy, and Myles' Textbook for Midwives. In the 1980s, in addition to new texts in all areas of clinical medicine, it published an extensive list of medical and nursing textbooks in low-cost editions for low-income countries supported by the UK-funded Educational Low Priced Book Scheme (ELBS).
