= William Beilby (physician) =

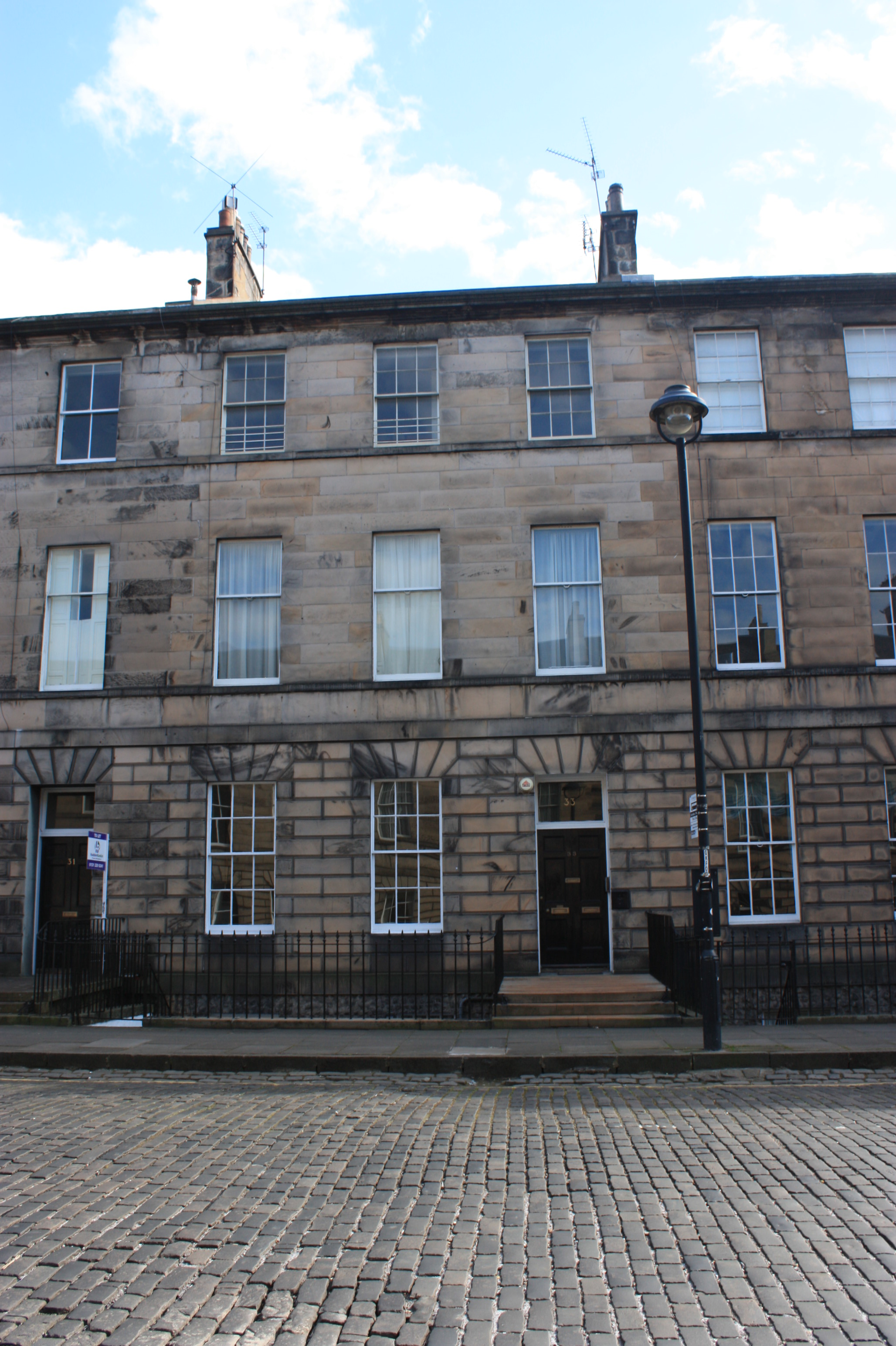
33 Great King Street, home of Dr William Beilby

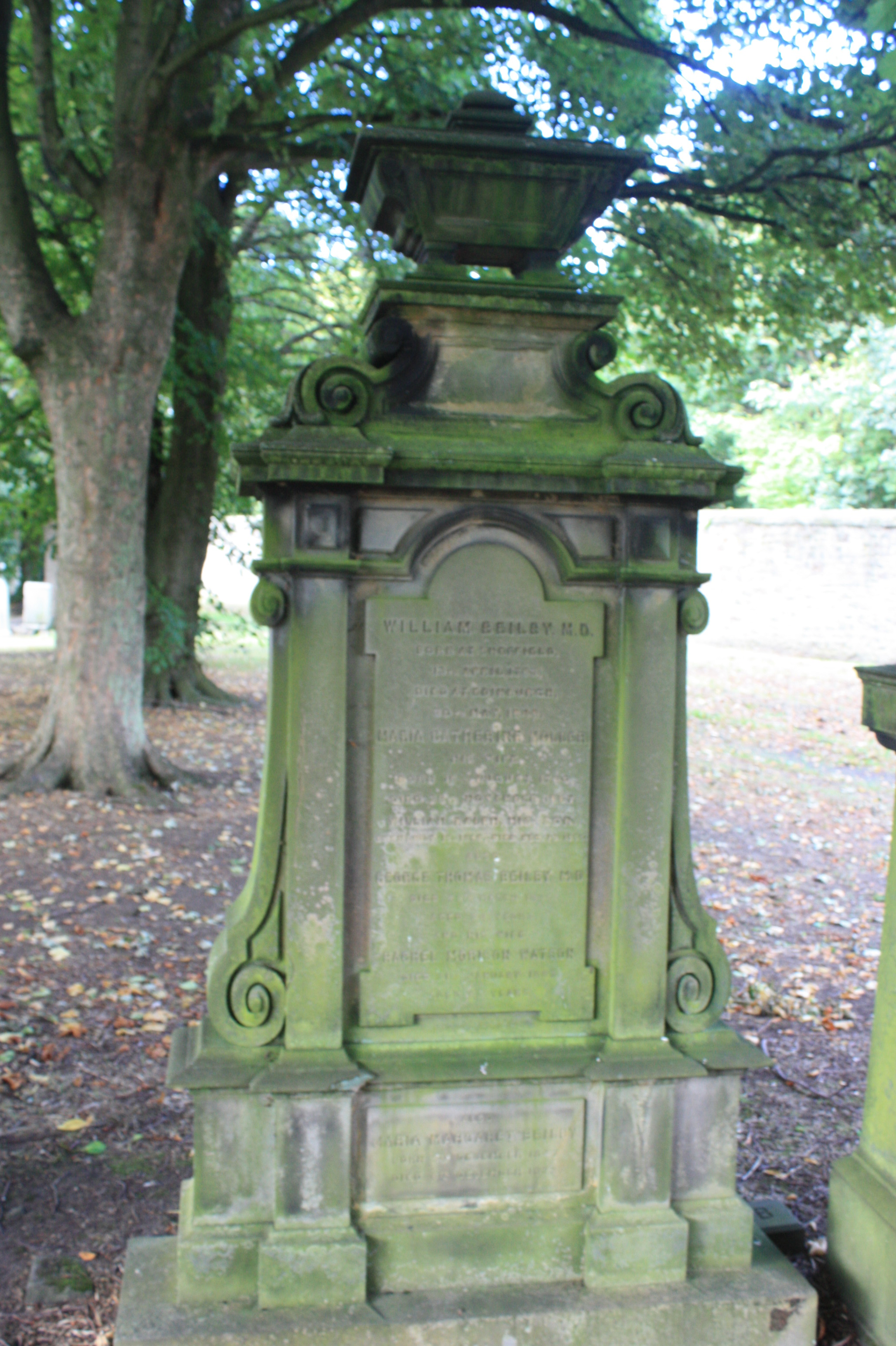
The grave of Dr William Beilby, Warriston Cemetery

William Beilby FRCPE (13 April 1783 – 30 May 1849) was a British philanthropic physician in Edinburgh.

== Life ==
Born in 1783 in Sheffield, the second son of Isabella and Thomas Beilby. In 1783 the family moved to Birmingham.

In 1807 he entered into a partnership in the linen trade with some relatives in Dublin, and in 1808 married Maria Catherine Moller (1790–1868). They had three children whilst living in Dublin, however only one survived.

In 1813 he moved to Edinburgh to study medicine. He and his wife had a further nine children in Edinburgh.

After passing his MD in 1816, he settled in Edinburgh to practise midwifery. He soon obtained a high reputation in his profession, and was appointed physician accoucheur to the New Town Dispensary at 4 East James Street (demolished to build the St James Centre). He took an interest in benevolent and religious matters, including the schemes of the Evangelical Alliance, and was the first president of the Medical Missionary Society.

In 1828 he is listed as a Governor of the Dean Orphan Hospital. In 1831 he was elected a member of the Aesculapian Club. In 1832 Beilby was elected a member of the Harveian Society of Edinburgh and served as president in 1839.

In 1832–33 he was residing at 33 Great King Street in Edinburgh. The following year he moved to 52 Queen Street. He did not live here long and sold the house to his colleague James Young Simpson around 1840.

He died at 57 Northumberland Street in Edinburgh on 30 May 1849. He is buried in Warriston Cemetery near the now-sealed eastern entrance.

== Family ==
He was married to Maria Catherine Moller (1790–1867).

His son Julius Henry Beilby (1823–1898) became Chairman of the Clydesdale Bank and is buried in Dean Cemetery.
