= Pavel Yushkov =

Russian footballer

Personal information
- Full name: Pavel Anatolyevich Yushkov
- Date of birth: 14 February 1979 (age 47)
- Place of birth: Vyazma, Russian SFSR
- Height: 1.75 m (5 ft 9 in)
- Position: Forward

Senior career*
Years	Team	Apps	(Gls)
1999–2001	FC Dynamo Bryansk	96	(18)
2002	FC Kristall Smolensk	18	(3)
2003	FC Dynamo Bryansk	35	(7)
2004–2005	FC Avangard Kursk	49	(6)
2006	Mika FC	23	(6)
2007	FC Volga Tver	0	(0)
2008	FC Pskov-747 Pskov	10	(1)
2009	FC Dnepr Smolensk	7	(0)
- * Club domestic league appearances and goals

Pavel Anatolyevich Yushkov (Russian: Павел Анатольевич Юшков; born 14 February 1979) is a former Russian professional footballer.

== Club career ==
He played two seasons in the Russian Football National League for FC Kristall Smolensk and FC Avangard Kursk.
