= John Halliday Croom =

Scottish surgeon and medical author

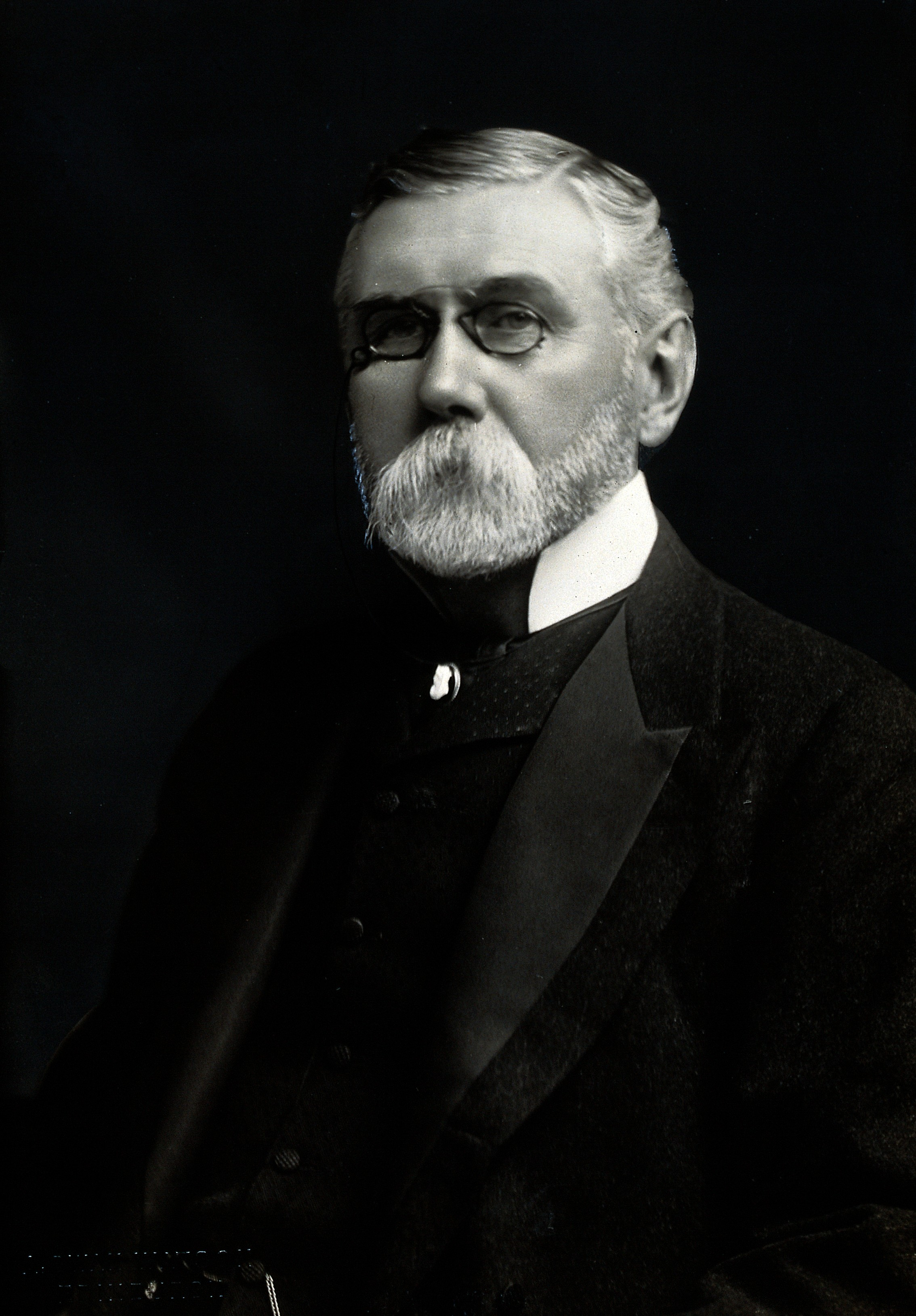
Sir John Halliday Croom

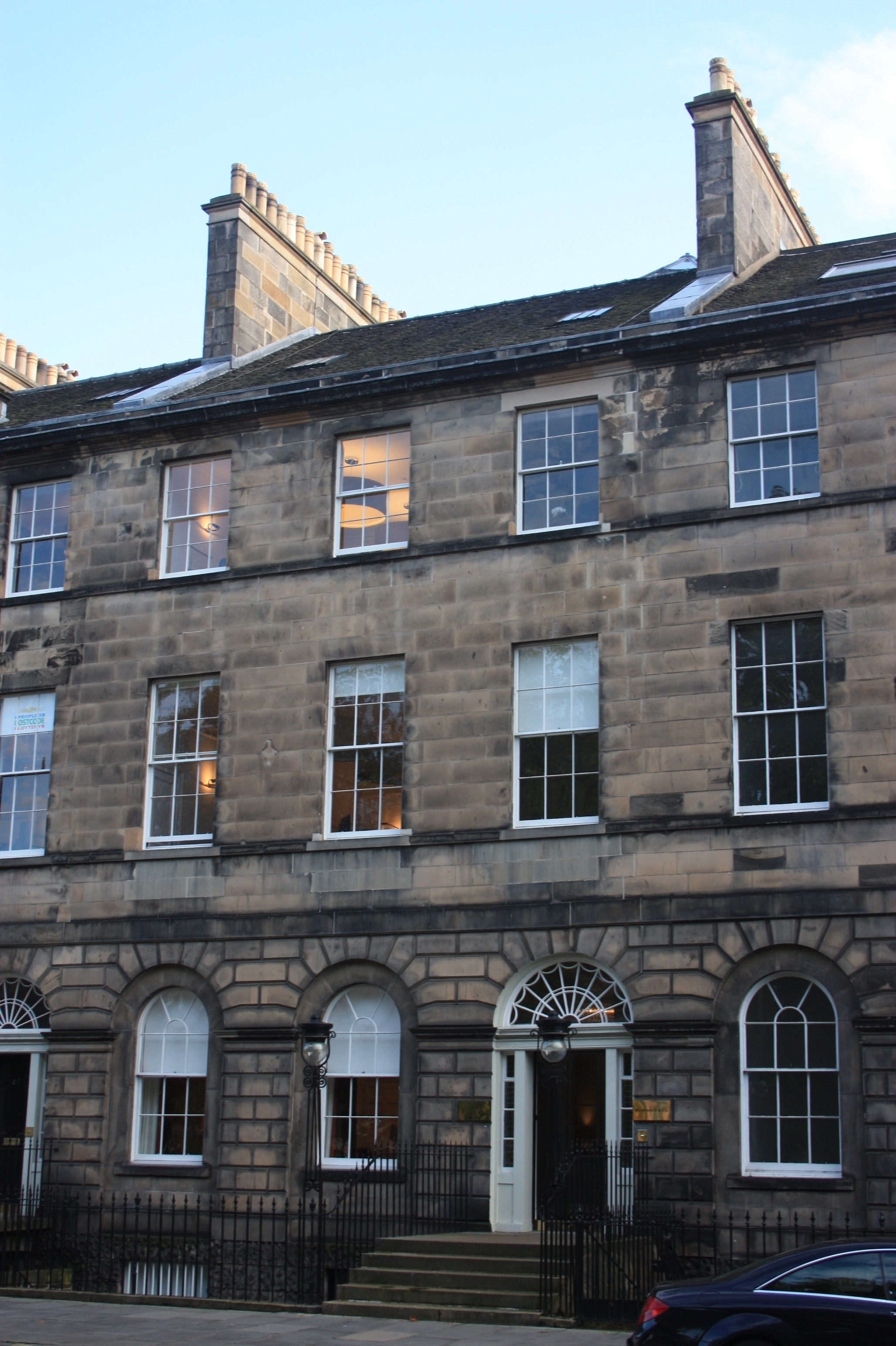
25 Charlotte Square, Edinburgh

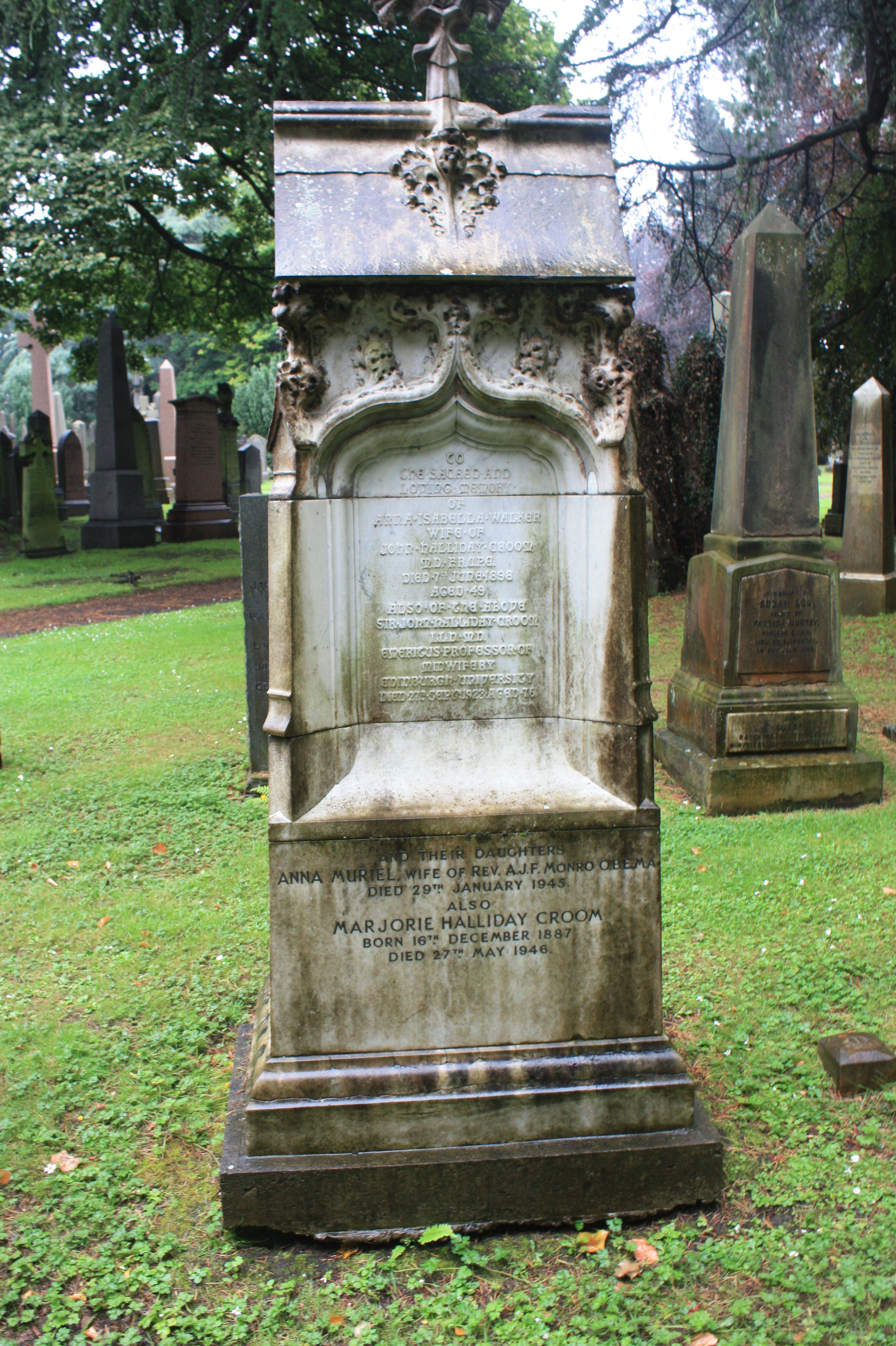
The grave of John Halliday Croom, Dean Cemetery, Edinburgh

Sir John Halliday Croom FRSE PRCPE PRCSE (15 January 1847 – 27 September 1923) was a Scottish surgeon and medical author. He served as President of the Royal College of Surgeons of Edinburgh.

== Life ==
He was born in the manse at Sanquhar in south-west Scotland on 15 January 1847, the son of Janet (née Halliday) and Rev. David Murray Croom of the United Presbyterian Church. The family moved to Edinburgh around 1855, where his father preached at the Lauriston Place church. In 1860, they were living at 1 Upper Gilmore Place in the Tollcross district. He attended the Royal High School in Edinburgh and studied medicine at the University of Edinburgh, graduating MD in 1882. He also studied in London and Paris.

In 1870, he began lecturing in midwifery at Minto House on Chambers Street in Edinburgh, part of the Edinburgh Extramural School of Medicine. In 1878, became a Senior Lecturer. He became an assistant to Prof Thomas Laycock around 1880 and was then assistant to Professor A. R. Simpson. In 1883, he became assistant gynaecologist at the Edinburgh Royal Infirmary. He was appointed "extra physician" or consultant in charge of the maternity wards from 1885 to 1900. His assistant from 1890 to 1894 was Dr James Lamond Lackie. From 1905 to 1921, he was Professor of Midwifery at the University of Edinburgh. He was succeeded in the chair by Benjamin Philip Watson.

A manuscript copy of lectures given by Croom and Lackie on midwifery and gynaecology taken down by a student survives as part of the Manchester Medical Manuscripts Collection, held by special collections at the University of Manchester.

In 1875, he was elected a member of the Harveian Society of Edinburgh and served as president in 1906. In 1886 he was elected a Fellow of the Royal Society of Edinburgh. His proposers were Sir John Murray, John Batty Tuke, Sir William Turner and John Chiene. The latter is said to have been his lifelong friend. In 1899 he was elected a member of the Aesculapian Club.

He was president of the Edinburgh Obstetrical Society on no fewer than three occasions.

He was knighted for services to medicine in the 1902 Coronation Honours, receiving the accolade from King Edward VII at Buckingham Palace on 24 October that year. In the same year he was elected President of the Royal College of Surgeons of Edinburgh In his later years he lived at 25 Charlotte Square one of Edinburgh’s most prestigious addresses. His friend John Chiene lived next door at 26 Charlotte Square.

He died of congestion of the lungs at home in Edinburgh on 27 September 1923. He was buried in Dean Cemetery on Saturday 29 September. The grave lies towards the western end of the main east-west path, on its south side.

== Publications ==
- Minor Gynaecological Operations and Appliances (1879)
- The Bladder During Parturition (1883)

== Artistic recognition ==
His portrait, painted by Robert Henry Alison Ross c.1920, hangs in the Royal College of Surgeons of Edinburgh.

== Family ==
He married Anna Isabella Walker in 1875. She died in 1898. They had one son, Dr David Halliday Croom FRCPE (1877-1859) and three daughters. David married Eleanor Addey Blair Cunynghame, daughter of the surgeon Robert James Blair Cunynghame. David's son, named Sir John Halliday Croom, in his grandfather's honour was born in Edinburgh on 2 July 1909. He was knighted in 1973 by Queen Elizabeth II, and is best remembered as author of the Croom Report of 1969: a report on the future of medical training and studies in Scotland. He served as President of the Royal College of Physicians of Edinburgh 1970-73.

His eldest daughter had married Dr A J Beattie but happily also took on Croom’s domestic duties, so it was a double blow when she also died, in 1913.

His brother was the civil engineer, James Murray Croom (d.1918).

Academic offices
Preceded by Alexander Russell Simpson	Professor of Midwifery, Edinburgh; 1905-1922	Succeeded by Benjamin Philip Watson
