= Edinburgh Royal Maternity Hospital and Simpson Memorial Maternity Pavilion =

- NHS Lothian
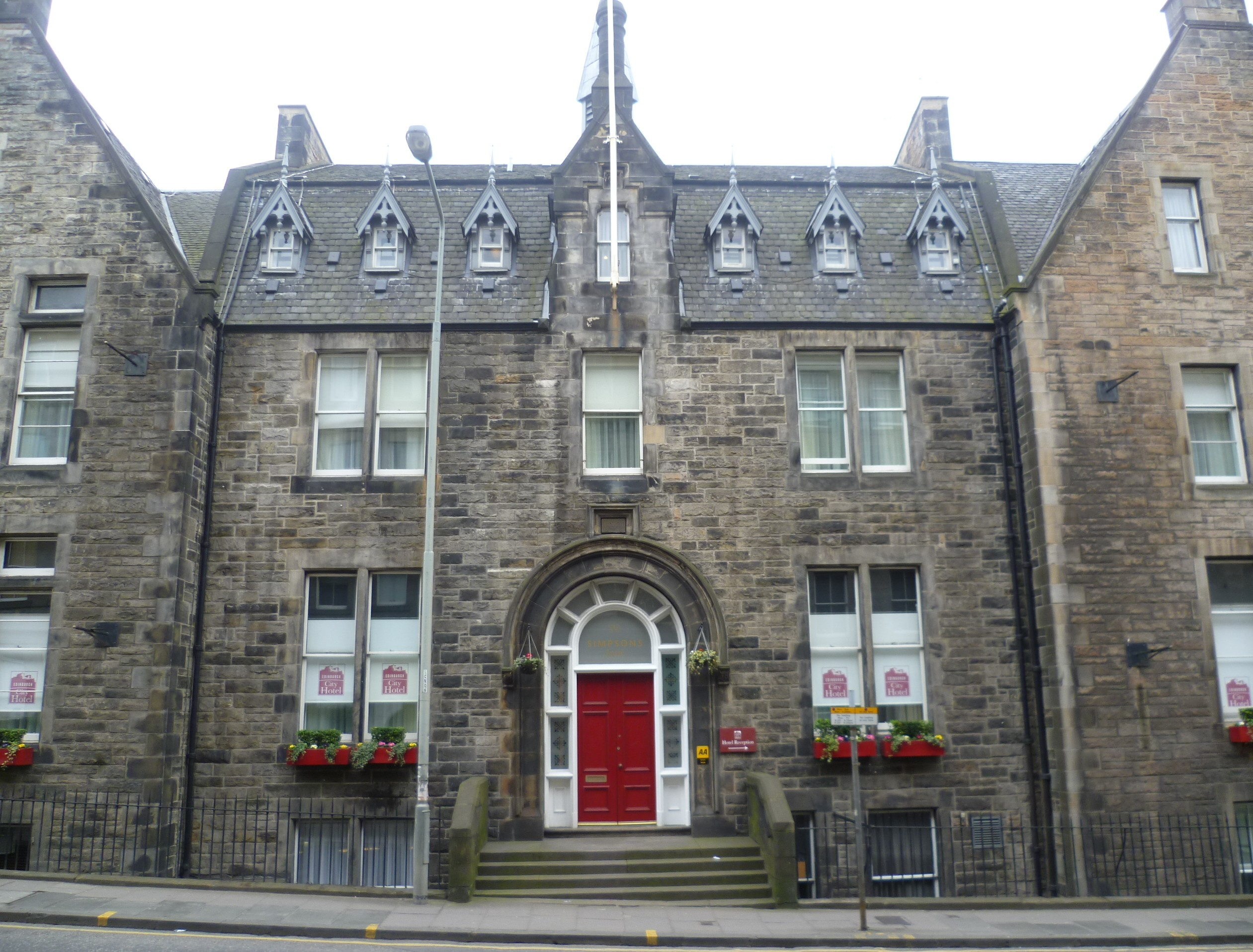
- The original hospital building, at 79 Lauriston Place, has been converted into a hotel

- Shown in Edinburgh

Geography
- Location: Edinburgh, Scotland
- Coordinates: 55.9444°N 3.2032°W

Organisation
- Care system: NHS Scotland
- Type: Specialist
- Affiliated university: University of Edinburgh Medical School

Services
- Emergency department: No
- Speciality: Maternity

History
- Founded: 1791 or 1793
- Closed: 2002

Links
- Lists: Hospitals in Scotland

The Edinburgh Royal Maternity and Simpson Memorial Pavilion was a maternity hospital in Lauriston, Edinburgh, Scotland. Its services have now been incorporated into the Royal Infirmary of Edinburgh at Little France.

== History ==
Midwifery in Edinburgh, as a part of the medical curriculum, began in 1756 with Thomas Young, professor of midwifery. Early provisions for midwifery consisted of four maternity beds at Edinburgh's Royal Infirmary in 1756. Young's predecessor, Alexander Hamilton, was responsible for establishing the independent Edinburgh General Lying-in Hospital which afforded students the opportunity for practical experience. ("Lying-in" is an archaic term for childbirth, referring to the long bedrest prescribed for new mothers in their postpartum confinement.) It was based at Park Place and opened in either 1791 or 1793. It became known as the Edinburgh Royal Maternity Hospital in 1846.

In 1879, using funds collected to commemorate Sir James Young Simpson's contribution to obstetrics, a purpose-built maternity hospital was opened in Edinburgh, to provide a facility where the poor could access medical supervision for childbirth. It was named the Edinburgh Royal Maternity and Simpson Memorial Hospital. The Married Women's Pavilion, which was located in the west wing under the original plans by architects MacGibbon and Ross, had to be postponed in 1879 due to insufficient funds. It was eventually opened by Lady Candida Louise Hay, 10th Marchioness of Tweeddale in 1895.

By 1910, the capacity of the facility was under strain, and following the First World War, the hospital expanded into several flats in nearby Lauriston Park and Graham Street to cope with increased demand. Britain's first ante-natal clinic began at this site in 1915, to be followed, in 1926, by a post-natal clinic when the facility amalgamated with the Royal Infirmary of Edinburgh.

The new Simpson Memorial Maternity Pavilion, which was designed by Thomas W. Turnbull in the classical style, opened in 1939. The initial provisions of the hospital consisted of two lying–in wards, a labour ward, a dispensary, kitchens and administrative quarters, as well as quarters for the matron, two house surgeons and seven or eight nurses.

The facility was directly managed by the Royal Infirmary of Edinburgh, within a grouping of hospitals that would become the Royal Infirmary of Edinburgh National Health Service Trust in 1994. After services transferred to the Simpson Centre for Reproductive Health at the Royal Infirmary of Edinburgh's new site in Little France, the Simpson Memorial Maternity Pavilion closed in March 2002.

== Notable births ==
- Actor Sean Connery – 25 August 1930
- Actor Ronnie Corbett – 4 December 1930
- The Beatles' original bassist Stuart Sutcliffe – 23 June 1940
- Scottish Conservative leader Ruth Davidson – 10 November 1978

== See also ==
- Margaret Myles
