= Vasily Stroganov =

Russian physician (1858–1938)

- Born: 10 January [O.S. 29 December] 1858; Vyazma, Vyazemsky Uyezd, Smolensk Governorate, Russian Empire
- Died: 24 September 1938 (aged 80)
- Citizenship: Russian Empire; USSR
- Known for: Stroganoff method
- Scientific career
- Fields: OB/GYN

Vasily Vasilyevich Stroganov, also known as Stroganoff, (Russian: Василий Васильевич Строганов, 10 January [O.S. 29 December] 1858, Vyazma, – 24 September 1938) was a Russian physician specializing in obstetrics and gynaecology. His works mostly dealt with treatment of eclampsia. The Stroganoff method is named after him.
