= Edinburgh Encyclopædia =

Encyclopedia

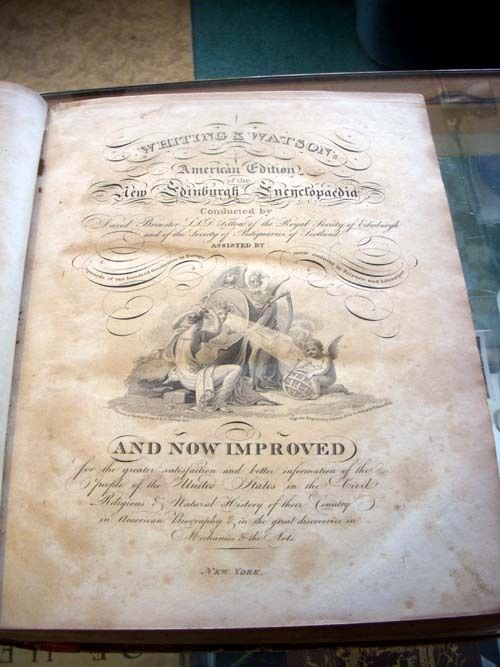
American reprint 1832

The Edinburgh Encyclopædia is an encyclopaedia in 18 volumes, printed and published by William Blackwood and edited by David Brewster between 1808 and 1830. In competition with the Edinburgh-published Encyclopædia Britannica, the Edinburgh Encyclopædia is generally considered to be strongest on scientific topics, where many of the articles were written by the editor.

The Edinburgh Encyclopædia was originally planned to encompassed 12 volumes, but by the time the final volume was published, in 1830, it counted 18 volumes. Some subjects, such as the polarization of light and electromagnetism, had not even been heard of when the project began, and yet the Encyclopedia had articles on them. The electromagnetism article was even contributed by Hans Christian Ørsted, the founder of modern electromagnetic studies. It also included information on contemporary events such as Christopher Hansteen's 1829 expedition to Siberia.

In 1815 William Elford Leach published the first bibliography of entomology in Brewster's Edinburgh Encyclopædia (see Timeline of entomology – 1800–1850).

Joseph Parker of Philadelphia and Whiting & Watson of New York City printed American editions, both in 1832.

== Contributors ==
A list of major contributors, with indications of their articles, was published in 1830.

Other contributors – "Gentlemen Eminent in Science and Literature" – included Adam Anderson, Charles Babbage, Thomas Carlyle, Robert Gordon, Robert Edmond Grant, John Leslie, Henry Liston, John Gibson Lockhart and Thomas Telford.

- Thomas Allan
- Adam Anderson
- Alexander Annesley
- Charles Babbage ("Notation", "Porisms")
- Robert Bald
- Alexander Balfour
- John Barclay
- Peter Barlow
- James Bell
- Jacob Berzelius
- J. B. Biot
- Philip Bliss
- James Bonar
- John Bostock
- David Brewster
- G. Brewster
- James Brewster
- Patrick Brewster
- David Brown
- Robert Brown
- William Brown
- H. R. Brown
- David Buchanan
- Robertson Buchanan
- Rev. W. Burns
- Robert Burns
- Thomas Campbell
- Archibald Campbell
- Thomas Carlyle
- Thomas Chalmers
- James Cleland
- John Clennel
- John Colquhoun
- John Davies
- John Graham Dalyell
- J. Denholm
- David Dickson
- Thomas Lauder Dick
- Lieutenant-General Alexander Dirom
- Henry Dewar
- Archdeacon Drummond
- Henry Duncan
- John Duncan
- Rev. Thomas Duncan
- Thomas Duncan
- George Dunbar
- James Erskine
- William Edgeworth
- James Esdaile
- John Farey, senior
- John Farey, junior
- Andrew Ferguson
- Denis Ferral
- John Fleming
- James D. Forbes
- Andrew Fyffe
- William Galbraith
- Thomas Galloway
- Alexander Galloway; (wrote the "Perspective" article, and was an acquaintance of Thomas Carlyle)
- James Geddes
- Patrick Gibson
- Charles Giesecke
- John Gordon
- Robert Gordon
- James Grahame
- Robert Grant
- James Grierson
- John Gunn
- George Harvey
- William Jory Henwood
- J. F. W. Herschel ("Isoperimetrical Problems", "Mathematics")
- Samuel Hibbert
- John Hodgson
- James Innes
- David Irving
- Alexander Irvine
- Josiah Kirby
- Robert Kirkwood
- Thomas Jackson
- Robert Jameson
- John Jamieson
- George Kellie
- Robert Kerr
- William Laidlaw
- Dionysius Lardner
- William Leach
- John Lee
- John Leslie
- Henry Liston
- John Lizars
- J. G. Lockhart
- John Loudon
- Joseph Lowe
- Robert Lundie
- Robert Lyall
- A. Macarthur
- Charles Mackenzie
- George Mackenzie
- James Macdonald
- Archduke Maximilian
- Mr. Maclaurin
- J. R. MacCulloch
- John MacCulloch
- William Memes
- J. Morell
- Walter Morison
- Lockhart Muirhead
- William Muller
- John Murray
- Hugh Murray
- Thomas Murray
- Andrew Mylne
- John Narien
- James Nicol
- Patrick Neill
- Peter Nicholson
- Alexander Nimmo
- Hans Christian Ørsted
- George Peacock
- William Pearson
- Alexander Peterkin
- John Pond
- Richard Poole (wrote on "Language", "Mind", "Philology" and "Philosophy")
- William Percivall
- John Ramsay
- William Ramsay
- Thomas Reid
- William Ritchie
- Abraham Robertson
- John Robison
- William Scoresby
- Alexander Scott
- John Corse Scott
- Robert Eden Scott
- James Simpson
- Rev. W. Singer
- J. C. Simonde de Sismondi
- James Skene
- Thomas Somerville
- Robert Stevenson
- William Stevenson, (the father of Elizabeth Gaskell; article "Chivalry" out of a total of around 50)
- Andrew Mitchell Thomson, (part-owner)
- John Thomson
- Thomas Traill
- Rev. J. M. Turner
- Edmund Turrel
- William Tytler
- Rev. W. Wade
- Josiah Walker
- William Wallace
- James Watt
- James Wilson
- John Yule
