= Liston (surname) =

Liston is a surname. Notable people with the surname include:

- Beth Liston (born 1974), American politician from Ohio
- Carol Liston, Australian historian
- Ellen Liston (1838–1885), Australian teacher and writer
- Emil Liston (1890–1949), American athletic coach and administrator
- Eoin Liston (born 1957), Irish sportsperson
- Henrietta Liston, British botanist
- Henry Liston (1771–1836), Scottish minister and inventor
- James Michael Liston (1881–1976), New Zealand Catholic bishop
- J. J. Liston (1872–1944), Australian civic leader and sporting administrator
- John Liston (c. 1776–1846), English comedian
- Larry Liston (born 1952), American politician from Colorado
- Melba Liston (1926–1999), American jazz musician
- Robert Liston (1794–1847), Scottish surgeon
- Robert Liston (diplomat) (1742–1836), British diplomat
- Robert Liston (minister) (1730–1796), Scottish clergyman
- Sarah Liston (1781–1854), Scottish actress and singer
- Sonny Liston (c. 1930–1970), American boxer
- Tricia Liston (born 1992), American basketball player
- Tom Liston, American security analyst
- Virginia Liston (1890–1932), American blues and jazz singer
- William Glen Liston (1872–1950), British Army physician and medical entomologist

== See also ==
- Catherine Liston-Heyes (born ca 1966), Canadian economist
