= Encyclopædia Edinensis =

The Encyclopædia Edinensis was a six-volume general encyclopedia published in Edinburgh in 1827, and intended for a popular audience. It was edited by James Millar, who died just before it was complete.

== Editorial staff ==
- James Millar, principal editor
- Jeremiah Kirby and Richard Poole, main editors and contributors. Poole wrote articles on "Mental Diseases".
- John Sommers, minister at Falkirk, was proprietor and also editor for the last three volumes.

Work began on the Encyclopædia in 1816. Millar edited the fourth and part of the fifth editions of the Encyclopædia Britannica and had contributed extensively to both. His goal with the Edinensis was to create a more popular work. However, his use of a large quarto format, the same size as the Britannica, hampered the project because smaller duodecimal formats were more easily handled.

== Phrenology ==
The editorial line was quite sympathetic to phrenology. According to the Phrenological Journal, Sommers approved the inclusion of the uncritical article "Phrenology". Poole in 1819 wrote for the encyclopedia an article on education, an early treatment from the point of phrenology.

== Other contributors ==
- John Adamson of Newton
- Alexander Anderson, Polar Expeditions etc.
- George Buchanan, Astronomy and Dialling
- James Couper
- John Dick M.D., Midwifery
- Alexander Duncan, Miracle etc.
- James Flint
- William Galbraith, Navigation
- Patrick Gibson, design
- Rev. David Liston, Calcutta, Mechanics
- Henry Liston, Music
- Robert Macmillan
- Lockhart Muirhead
- Rev. Thomas Nelson, Religion
- Alexander Peterkin
- Rev. Dr. Russel of Leith, Magnetism and Meteorology
- John Sommers
- Walter Tod, Theology etc.
- John Wallace
- Robert Wallace.
