= Richard Poole (physician) =

Scottish physician, psychiatrist and phrenologist

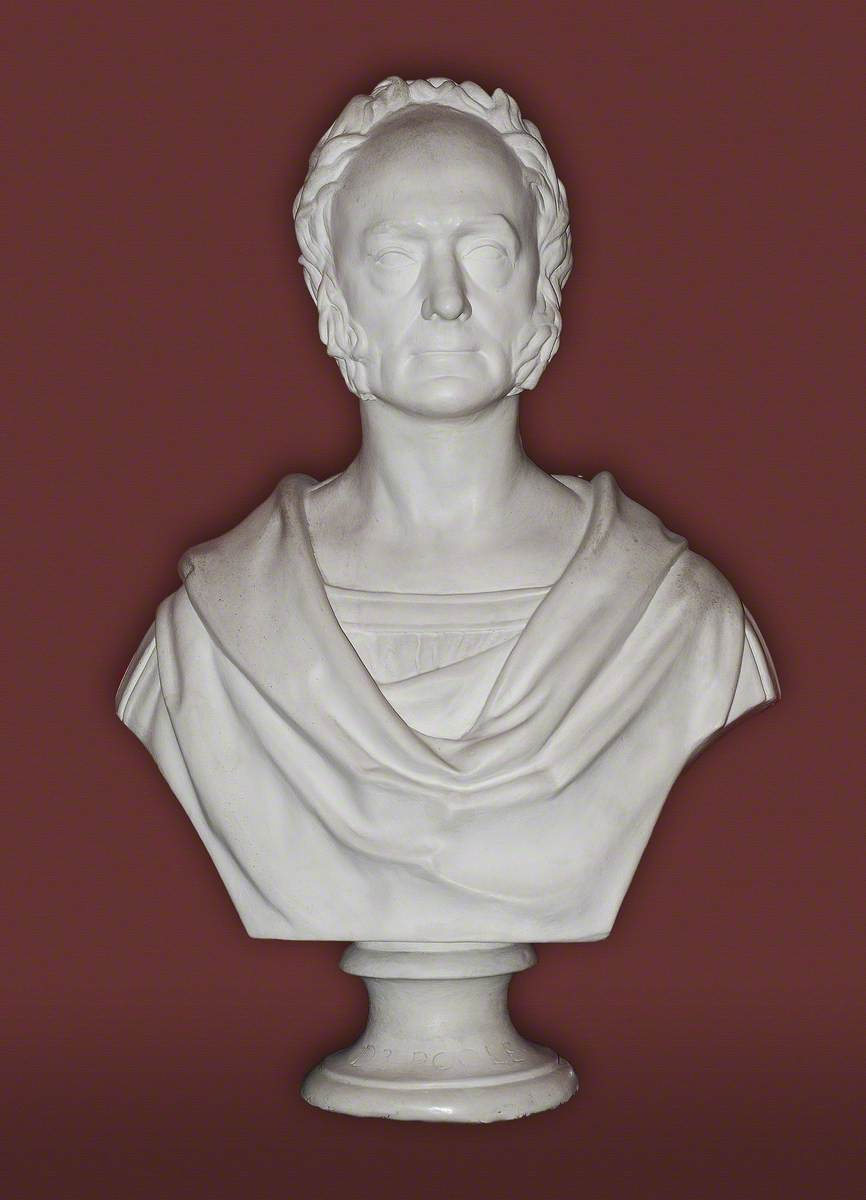
Bust of Richard Poole owned by the Royal College of Physicians of Edinburgh

Richard Poole (1781–1870) was a Scottish physician, psychiatrist, and phrenologist.

== Life ==
Poole was born in Edinburgh, on 27 November 1781, from an English background. His father Matthew Poole (or Pool) owned a coffee house and hotel at 1 Princes Street and lived above.

By 1800 his father is retired and living at Reid's Close on the Canongate in Edinburgh's Old Town.

Poole studied Medicine and graduated M.D. at the University of St Andrews in 1805. He was editor of the New Edinburgh Review, and published articles promoting phrenology in the early 1820s; it existed 1821 to 1823. Poole was also first editor of the Phrenological Journal. Poole joined the editorial staff of the Encyclopædia Edinensis under James Millar.

In 1820 he was living at 23 Broughton Street, a flat in Edinburgh's east end.

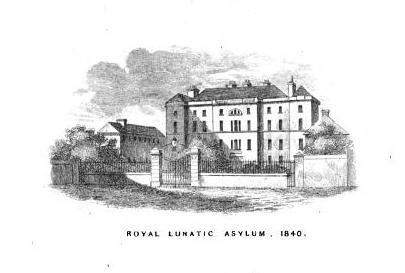
Royal Lunatic Asylum, Montrose, in 1840.

From 1820 Poole campaigned for a new infirmary in Edinburgh. In 1825 he was elected a Fellow of the Royal College of Physicians of Edinburgh. In 1829 he was elected a member of the Aesculapian Club. In 1831 Poole was elected a member of the Harveian Society of Edinburgh and served as one of its secretaries from 1834-1837.

In the late 1830s he was a pioneer advocate of mental health reform, and in 1838 he became superintendent of the Montrose Asylum, succeeding W. A. F. Browne. He remained at Montrose until 1845. He then kept a private asylum at Middlefield, Aberdeenshire.

Poole died in Coupar Angus on 18 February 1870 aged 88 at the house of his daughter, Mrs Kirkwood. He is buried with his wife in the churchyard of St. Machar's Cathedral in Aberdeen.

== Works ==
- An Essay on Education (1825). In this work, from the Encyclopædia Edinensis, Poole acknowledges help in early life from Archibald Alison. He advocated education in cases of mental retardation.
- A Letter to Andrew Duncan, Senior, M.D. ... Regarding the Establishment of a New Infirmary (1825). Pamphlet addressed to Andrew Duncan, the elder on the infirmary question; Duncan replied to the agitation for a new infirmary in a letter to William Fettes.
- Report on Examination of Medical Practitioners (1833)
- Memoranda regarding the Royal Lunatic Asylum, Infirmary, and Dispensary, of Montrose (1841)

He is credited with dramas, including "Willie Armstrong" performed in Edinburgh in 1829.

Poole also wrote for the Edinburgh Encyclopædia and Encyclopædia Britannica. A list of publications appeared in Scottish Notes and Queries.

== Family ==
An epitaph gives Jane Caird as Poole's wife; it also records his dates as 1781 to 1870. Their children included Samuel Wordsworth Poole, a physician and episcopal clergyman.

== Artistic recognition ==
A bust of Poole is held at the Royal College of Physicians of Edinburgh. It was donated by his daughter, Mrs Sandeman of Glasgow.
