= James Methuen Graham =

Scottish surgeon

James Methuen Graham

James Methuen Graham FRSE FRCSE (1882–1962) was a Scottish surgeon. He was President of the Royal College of Surgeons of Edinburgh for the period 1945 to 1947 and Senior President of the Royal Medical Society. He made considerable advances in the fields of blood transfusion and the thyroid.

== Life ==
He was the son of Captain Dugald Graham of the Northern Lighthouse Service and Fishery Board. He was raised in a villa at 12 Wardie Avenue, Edinburgh. He was educated at George Watsons College then studied medicine at the University of Edinburgh from 1899 to 1904, graduating with an MB ChB. He was made a Fellow of the Royal College of Surgeons of Edinburgh in 1907.

In 1919 the College awarded him the Chiene Medal for his thesis on blood transfusion. He worked as Assistant Surgeon at the Edinburgh Royal Infirmary on Lauriston Place and was promoted to Senior Surgeon in 1928. He also assisted at the Deaconess Hospital and lectured in Pathology at the University of Edinburgh. He was Chairman of the Edinburgh University Postgraduate Board for nine years.

In middle age he lived at 6 Castle Terrace, a terraced house facing Edinburgh Castle. In 1938 he was elected to the Aesculapian Club of Edinburgh.

In 1944 he was elected a Fellow of the Royal Society of Edinburgh. His proposers were Sir John Fraser, Sir Andrew Davidson, Sir Sydney Smith and Alexander Dron Stewart. At this time he lived at 8 Manor Place in Edinburgh's West End. In 1952 he was elected President of the Harveian Society of Edinburgh.

He died on 13 March 1962.

== Artistic recognition ==
His portrait, by Stanley Cursiter is held in the Royal College of Surgeons of Edinburgh.
