= Alexander Peterkin =

Scottish lawyer, journalist and writer

Alexander Peterkin (26 March 1781 – 9 November 1846) was a Scottish lawyer, journalist and writer.

== Life ==
Peterkin was born in Macduff in Banffshire, where his father, William Peterkin, was a parish minister. His father was translated to Leadhills, Lanarkshire, in 1785, and in 1787 to Ecclesmachan, West Lothian, where he died in 1792. Alexander's education, begun at the parish school, was completed in Edinburgh, and he closed his university curriculum as a law student in 1803. In this year he was enrolled in the first regiment of Royal Edinburgh volunteers, feeling with Walter Scott and others that the time needed a strong civilian army.

After a full training in the office of a Writer to the Signet, Peterkin was duly qualified as a solicitor before the supreme courts (S. S. C.), and he began his professional career at Peterhead before 1811 as "attorney, notary public, and conveyancer". He was sheriff-substitute of Orkney from 1814 to 1823, when he returned to Edinburgh.

For some years he combined journalism with his legal work; he was connected with newspapers in Belfast and Perth, and from 1833 to 1835 he was editor of the Kelso Chronicle. In his later years he was known as a leading ecclesiastical lawyer, while still devoting his leisure to literary work. He died at Edinburgh on 9 November 1846.

A lover of literature for its own sake, Peterkin numbered among his friends Walter Scott, Alexander Jeffrey, John Wilson, and the leading contemporary men of letters in Edinburgh.

Thomas Wilson Bayne wrote in the Dictionary of National Biography: "A 'whig of 1688', Peterkin was a strenuous and unsparing controversialist.... He was a vigorous and lucid writer, his earlier manner being somewhat florid, and his polemical thrusts occasionally more forcible than polite. His writings on Orkney and Shetland may be consulted with advantage, and his learned and systematic Booke of the Universall Kirk has a distinctly authoritative value."

Peterkin married in 1807 Miss Giles, daughter of an Edinburgh citizen, with whom he had two sons and five daughters. The elder son, Alexander Peterkin (1814–1889), was successively editor of the Berwick Advertiser, sub-editor of the Edinburgh Advertiser, and on the staff of the London Times, from which he retired about 1853, owing to uncertain health. He published a poem, The Study of Art, 1870.

== Publications ==
Besides numerous pamphlets, miscellaneous papers in many periodicals, and an anonymous tale of Scottish life, The Parsonage, or my Father's Fireside, Peterkin published:

1. The Rentals of Orkney, 1820.
2. Notes on Orkney and Zetland, 1822.
3. Letter to the Landowners, Clergy, and other Gentlemen of Orkney and Zetland, 1823.
4. Scottish Peerage, 1826.
5. Compendium of the Laws of the Church, pt. i. 1830, pt. ii. 1831, supplement 1836.
6. Memoir of the Rev. John Johnston, Edinburgh, 1834.
7. The Booke of the Universall Kirk of Scotland, 1839.
8. The Constitution of the Church of Scotland as established at the Revolution, 1689–90, 1841.

All were published at Edinburgh. Peterkin also edited James Grahame's The Sabbath, with biography, 1807; Robert Fergusson's Poems, with biography, 1807–9, reprinted 1810; James Currie's Life of Burns, with prefatory critical review, 1815; and Records of the Kirk of Scotland, 1838.
