= James Millar (physician) =

Scottish physician, botanist and author

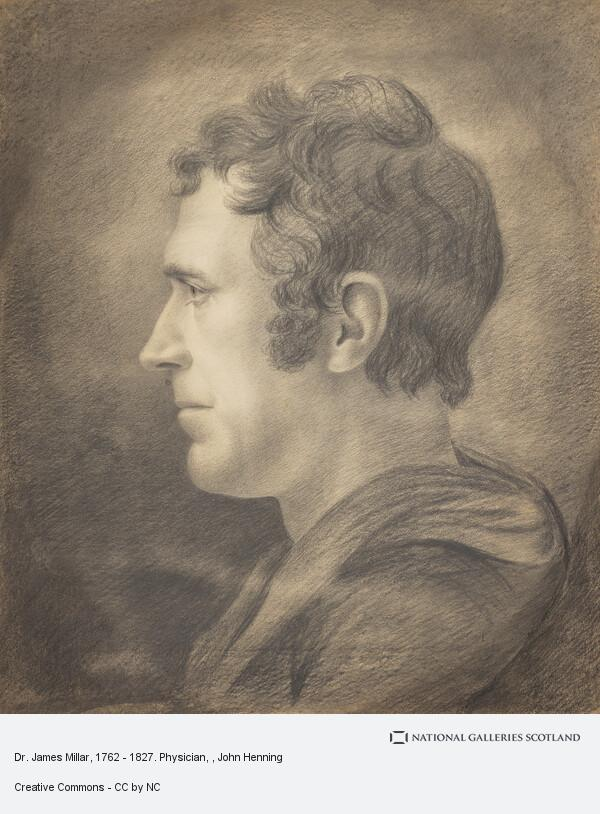
Portrait of James Millar by John Henning

Dr James Millar (or Miller) FRSE FRCPE (1762–1827) was a Scottish physician, botanist and author. He edited the fourth and fifth editions of the Encyclopædia Britannica.

Although a good writer on scientific topics, he was deemed a poor chief editor of the Britannica, being "slow and dilatory and not well qualified".

== Life ==
He was born in Ayr on the western Scottish coast on 4 February 1762.

He studied classics and science at Glasgow University. For some years he acted as tutor in Jamaica, and then was chaplain at Glasgow university. Moving to Edinburgh, he graduated M.D. and became fellow of the Royal College of Physicians of Edinburgh. In 1820 he was elected a member of the Harveian Society of Edinburgh and in 1822 he was elected a member of the Aesculapian Club. He frequently lectured on natural history and chemistry, and was one of the physicians at the Edinburgh Dispensary, where he caught a fever and died 13 July 1827.

He lived at 16 Brown Square in Edinburgh

He left a family.

== Works ==
In 1807 Millar published with William Vazie Observations on the Advantages and Practicability of making Tunnels under Navigable Rivers, particularly applicable to the proposed Tunnel under the Forth, Edinburgh. This work related to a plan for a tunnel from Rosyth to Queensferry, also involving John Grieve. Robert Bald was consulted, but the project came to nothing.

Millar also edited the fourth edition of the Encyclopædia Britannica, 20 vols., Edinburgh, 1810, and the last fifteen volumes of the fifth edition of the same work, 20 vols., Edinburgh, 1817; he contributed largely to both editions. Millar also planned and edited a more popular dictionary of arts, sciences, and literature, the Encyclopædia Edinensis, 6 vols., Edinburgh, 1827.

Other publications, mainly based on articles already contributed to encyclopædias, included:

- A Guide to Botany, Edinburgh, 1819.
- Elements of Chemistry, Edinburgh, 1820.
- Practical Observations on Cold and Warm Bathing, and descriptive Notices of Watering-places in Britain, Edinburgh, 1821.

== Artistic recognition ==
His portrait medallion by John Henning (1771-1851) is held in the Scottish National Portrait Gallery.

== References and footnotes ==
Attribution

This article incorporates text from a publication now in the public domain: Goodwin, Gordon (1894). "Millar, James". In Lee, Sidney (ed.). Dictionary of National Biography. Vol. 37. London: Smith, Elder & Co.
