= Hugh Meiklejohn =

Scottish minister (1765–1831)

- Born: 12 June 1765
- Died: 11 June 1831 (aged 65)
- Burial place: Abercorn churchyard
- Education: University of Glasgow
- Occupation: Church of Scotland minister
- Known for: Moderator of the General Assembly of the Church of Scotland
- Parents: Rev. George Meiklejohn (father); Mary Cree (mother)

Hugh Meiklejohn (12 June 1765 – 11 June 1831) was a Scottish minister who served as Moderator of the General Assembly of the Church of Scotland in 1810.

== Life ==
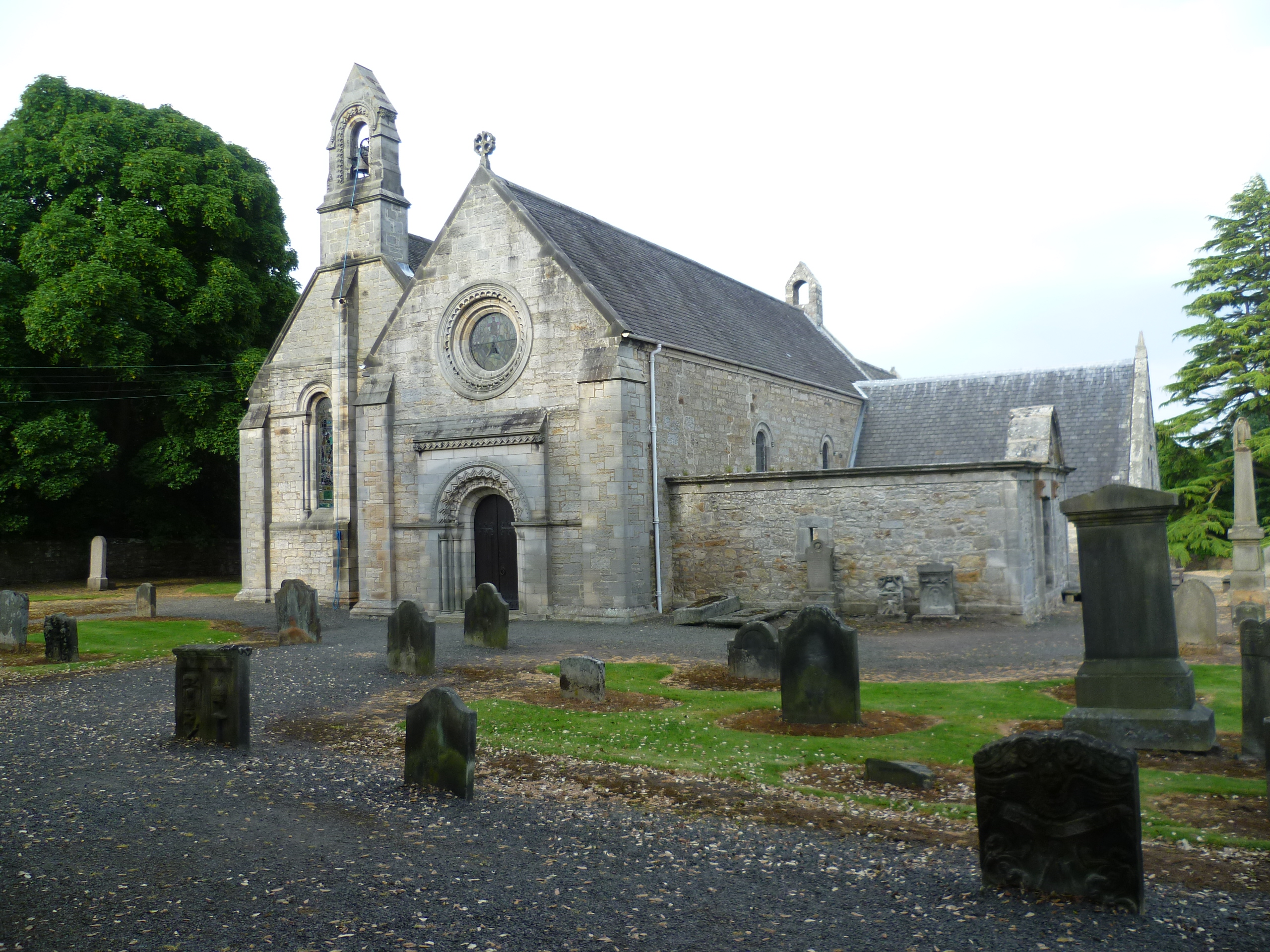
Abercorn Church, West Lothian

He was born on 12 June 1765, and was the only son of Mary Cree, daughter of Hugh Cree, of Saline, Fife. His father was Rev. George Meiklejohn, who was later a minister in the Carolinas in America. Hugh studied divinity at the University of Glasgow. He was licensed to preach by the Presbytery of Dunfermline as a Church of Scotland minister in August 1788.

In December 1791 he was ordained as minister of Abercorn in West Lothian under the patronage of James, Earl of Hopetoun in place of Rev. John Ritchie. From 1799, he took on the additional role of Professor of Ecclesiastical History at the University of Edinburgh, but continued as minister of Abercorn. In March 1800, the University of Edinburgh awarded him an honorary Doctor of Divinity.

He was elected Moderator of the General Assembly of the Church of Scotland in 1810.

From around 1810 he lived with his family at Merchant Street opposite Greyfriars Kirkyard in Edinburgh's Old Town.

In 1825, he writes to support his friend Rev John Somerville, in his invention of a safety catch for firearms.

He died on 11 June 1831, and is buried with his family in Abercorn churchyard. The grave lies to the east side of the church. His position at Abercorn was filled by Rev Lewis Hay Irving.

== Family ==
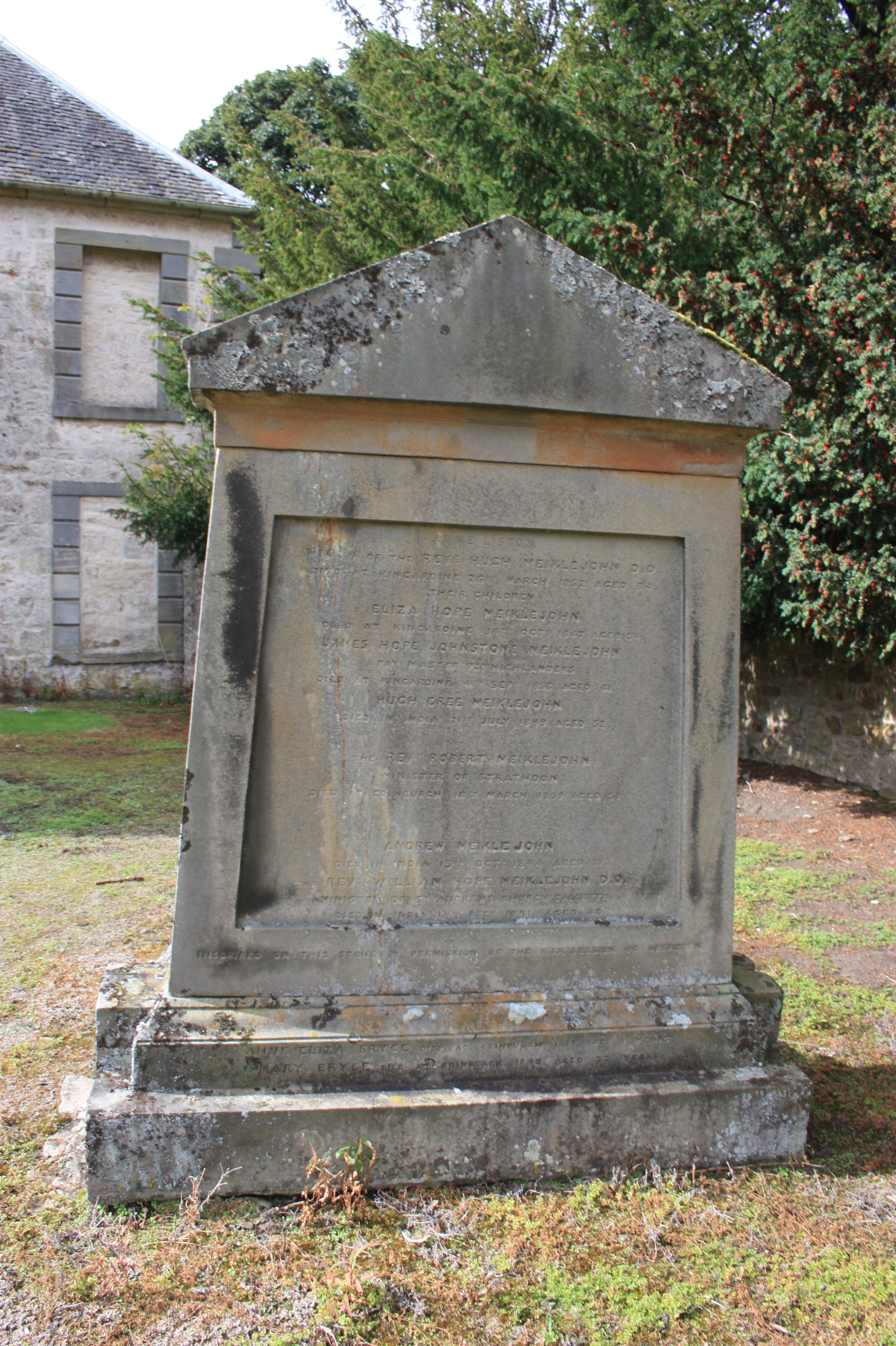
The Meiklejohn family grave, Abercorn churchyard

In 1792 he married Anne Liston (died 1852), eldest daughter of Very Rev. Robert Liston, Moderator in 1787/8. They had nine children including Cpt. James Hope Johnston Meiklejohn (1795-1856) of the Gordon Highlanders, Hugh Cree Meiklejohn (1797-1847), Rev. Robert Meiklejohn (1800-1859) minister of Strathdon, and Rev. William Hope Meiklejohn (1811-1850) a missionary in Calcutta.

== Publications ==
- Statistical Account of Abercorn (1799)
