= Alexander Dron Stewart =

Scottish physician and public health expert

Lt Col Alexander Dron Stewart IMS CIE FRSE FRCPE FRCSE MID LLD (1883–1969) was a 20th-century Scottish physician and public health expert associated with India.

He was joint founder of the Indian National Science Academy in 1935.

== Life ==
He was born in Blairgowrie in Perthshire on 22 June 1883, the son of William Stewart. He was educated at the High School of Dundee and studied medicine at the University of Edinburgh graduating with an MB ChB in 1906. He was commissioned into the Indian Army on 1 September 1906.

In the First World War he served as a surgeon in Gallipoli, Salonika and Mesopotamia. He was mentioned in dispatches and promoted to major in March 1918. After the war he did further training in public health in Edinburgh.

He left India permanently in 1935 and settled in Edinburgh.

From 1935 to 1948 he was Superintendent of the Edinburgh Royal Infirmary on Lauriston Place. In 1936 he was elected a Fellow of the Royal Society of Edinburgh. His proposers were Anderson Gray McKendrick, William Glen Liston, Sir David Wilkie, and William Frederick Harvey. In 1937 he was elected a member of the Harveian Society of Edinburgh. In 1938 he was elected to the Aesculapian Club of Edinburgh and from 1949 to 1955 served as honorary secretary.

He died in Edinburgh on 16 August 1969.

== Family ==
In 1916 he married Isobel Marguerite Mann (d.1964).

== Publications ==
- Public Health Laboratory Practice
