= Patrick Gibson (artist) =

Patrick Gibson (1782?–1829) was a Scottish landscape-painter and writer on art.

== Life ==
He was a native of Edinburgh. The date of his birth is usually given as December 1782, but on the other hand the parochial register of Dollar, Clackmannanshire states that he died in 1829, aged 54. He received a classical education in the High School, Edinburgh, and in a private academy, and studied art under Alexander Nasmyth and in the Trustees' Academy, then taught by John Graham.

From 1805 Gibson lived in Lambeth, exhibiting at the Royal Academy in 1805, 1806, and 1807, and at the British Institution in 1811. In 1808 he was in Edinburgh, where he joined the Society of Associated Artists, to whose exhibitions he contributed till 1816, and he was represented in the modern exhibitions of the Institution for the Encouragement of the Fine Arts in Scotland in 1821 and 1822. In the earlier exhibition catalogues his name occasionally appears as "Peter" Gibson.

In 1826 Gibson became a founder member of the Scottish Academy, to whose exhibitions he contributed (1827–9) landscape and architectural subjects, both Scottish and foreign. In 1824 he had been appointed professor of painting in Dollar Academy, and he died there on 23 August 1829.

== Works ==
In his works in oil, Gibson founded his style on Claude Lorrain and Nicolas Poussin. His water-colours were executed with washes of subdued pigments. He was also an etcher, and published in 1818 a series of six Etchings of Select Views in Edinburgh.

Gibson contributed a comprehensive article on "Design" to the Encyclopædia Edinensis; and articles on "Drawing", "Engraving", and "Miniature-painting" to the Edinburgh Encyclopædia. His View of the Progress and Present State of the Arts of Design in Britain, in the Edinburgh Annual Register for 1816, noticed minor Scottish painters. He was author under the pseudonym of "Roger Roundrobin, Esq.", of a Letter to the Managers and Directors of the Royal Institution, Edinburgh in 1826. A treatise on Perspective, written shortly before his death, was printed but not published.

Gibson also contributed to the daily press; and David Laing (Etchings of Wilkie and Geddes) attributed to Gibson a notice of Andrew Geddes's exhibition in the Edinburgh Evening Courant, 15 December 1821.

== Family ==
In June 1818 Gibson married Isabella, daughter of William Scott, a teacher of elocution; and his wife is stated to have been a musician and the composer of the tune Comfort.
