= Threemiletown =

Coordinates: 55.9651°N 3.5096°W

Threemiletown: Scottish Gaelic: Baile nan Trì Mìle; Scots: Threemiletoun
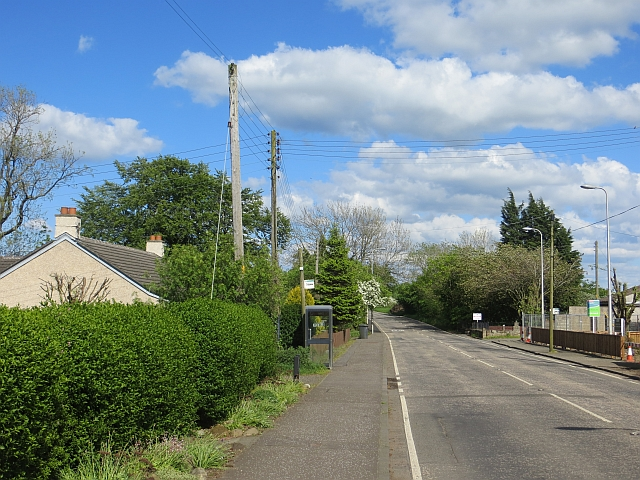
- Threemiletown, West Lothian

- Location within West Lothian
- Civil parish: Ecclesmachan
- Council area: West Lothian
- Country: Scotland
- Sovereign state: United Kingdom
- Police: Scotland
- Fire: Scottish
- Ambulance: Scottish

Threemiletown is a village in West Lothian, Scotland. The settlement sits north of Ecclesmachan and west of Winchburgh.

== History ==
There is a mid to late 18th century farmstead in Threemiletown which is category C listed. It is one of the oldest established farmsteads of the Hopetoun House estate. There is also a part abandoned former farmstead with an extant boilerhouse and large chimney just to the south of the village. It is a well-preserved example of the buildings of a steam-powered threshing installation. The use of fixed steam engines was a feature of intensive grain growing in the mid 19th century.

Trinlaymire is a former brick and tile works that existed on the edge of Threemiletown in the 19th century. In 1896, a shale oil pit mine was developed in Threemiletown, to the east of Redhill cottages, which closed in 1958. In 1941, a miner died in an industrial accident at Threemiletown. Another fatality occurred in 1947. In 1961 it had a population of 108.

In October 2014, a development plan was authorised by West Lothian Council to expand the settlement.

In August 2022, large fires damaged the rural area surrounding the village.

== Community facilities ==
Threemiletown shares a community council with Ecclesmachan.

There is a community park and children's playground in the village.

There are plans to create a community footpath between Threemiletown and Ecclesmachan but the project has not started due to lack of funds.

== Transport ==
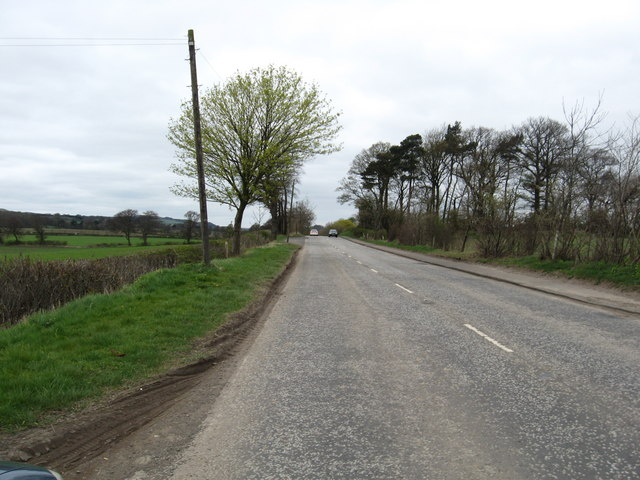
The road to Threemiletown

The village adjoins the junction and roads of the B8046 and the B9080.

The nearest railway station is Uphall railway station to the south, although there was a station to the north at Philpstoun but it was closed in 1951. A mineral branch line ran to the village but is no longer present.
