= Bulldog forceps =

Surgical instrument

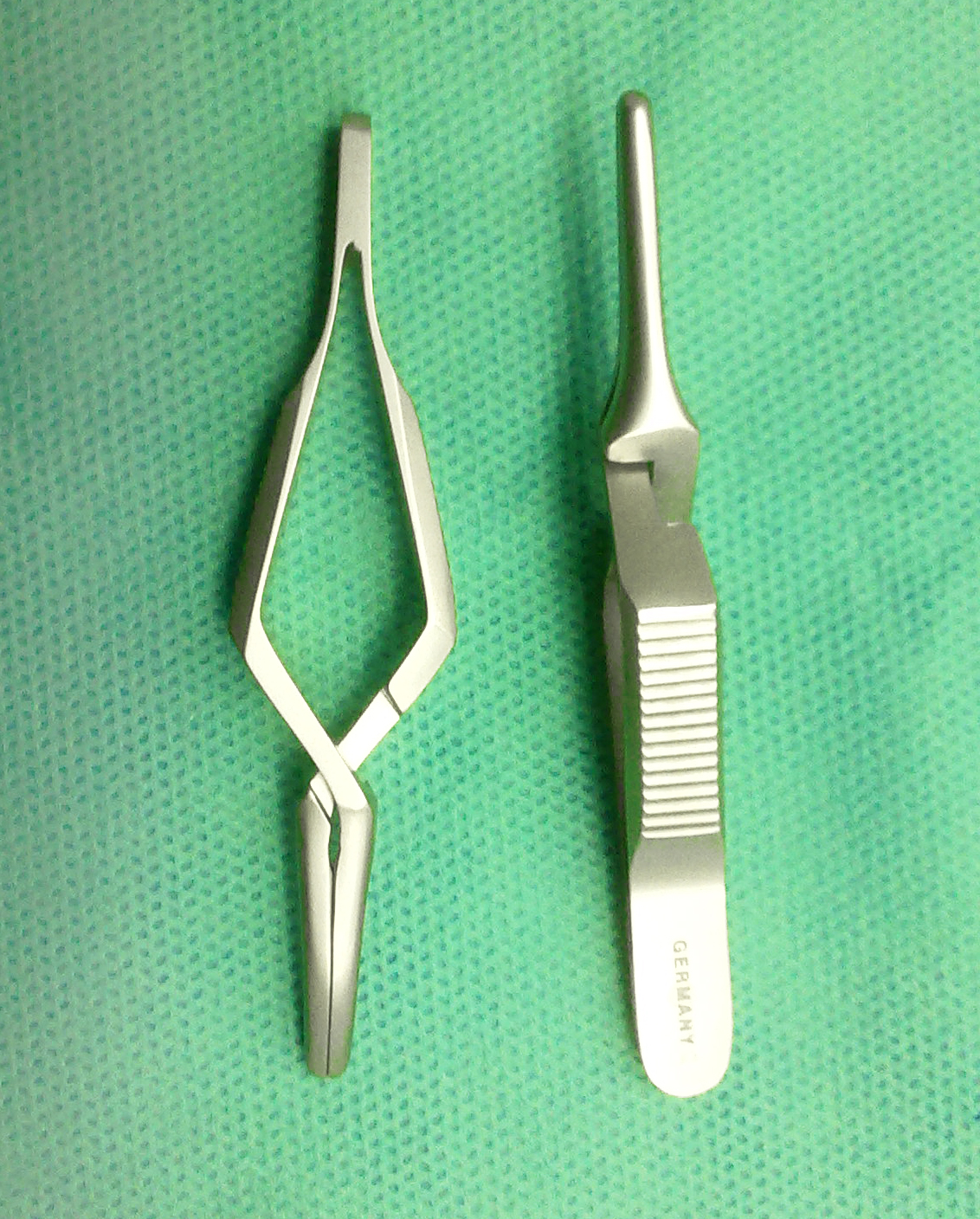
Bulldogs forceps

A bulldog forceps, clamp or serrefine is a type of forceps which is used in surgery. It has serrated jaws and a spring action so that it will grip and hold sutures, tissues or vessels. The spring may be weak or the jaws sheathed in a soft material so that the item being gripped is not crushed too severely.

Forceps of this general type were designed by particular surgeons including Johann Dieffenbach and Robert Liston.
