= Duncan Shaw (minister, born 1727) =

Duncan Shaw (1727–1794) was a minister of the Church of Scotland and historian, who served as Moderator of the General Assembly in 1786.

== Life ==
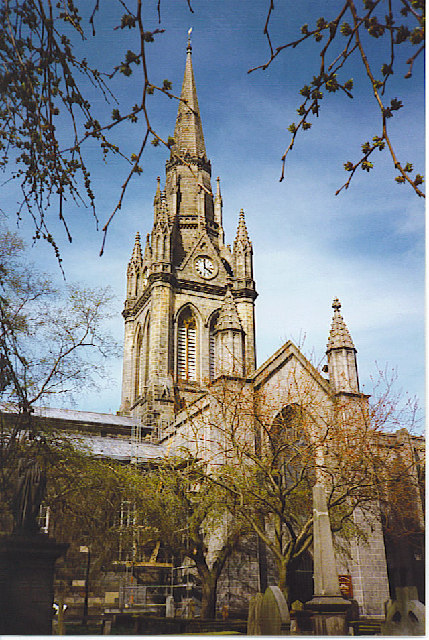
St Nicholas Kirk in Aberdeen

He was born in the manse at Elgin in 1727 the son of Lachlan Shaw, minister of the parish and author of the History of Morayshire. He was educated locally then studied at King's College, Aberdeen graduating MA in March 1747 he then undertook further studies in Divinity at Edinburgh University. He was licensed to preach by the Presbytery of Elgin in November 1752.

He was ordained to Rafford in May 1753. Marischal College awarded him an honorary Doctor of Divinity in September 1774. In April 1783 Aberdeen Town Council chose him as minister of the North Parish in Aberdeen, one of the three parishes contained within St Nicholas' Church in the city centre, and he translated to this new position in November 1783.

In 1786 he succeeded Henry Moncrieff-Wellwood as Moderator of the General Assembly of the Church of Scotland the highest position in the Scottish Church. He was succeeded by Robert Liston.

He died in Aberdeen on 23 June 1794.

== Family ==
In 1754 he married Jean Gordon (d.1795) daughter of George Gordon of Alves. They had three sons and four daughters.

== Publications ==
- A Comparative View if the Several Methods of Promoting Religious Instruction from the Earlist Down to the Present Time (2 vols. 1776)
- The History of Gamaliel
- The History and Philosophy of Judaism (1787)
- The Centurion's Testimony to Christ's Divinity (1793)
