= William Wallace (mathematician) =

Scottish mathematician and astronomer

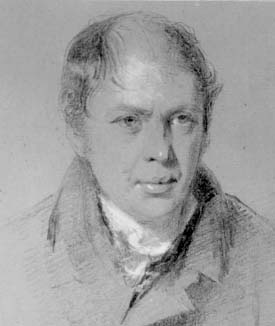
William Wallace

William Wallace FRSE MInstCE FRAS LLD (23 September 1768 – 28 April 1843) was a Scottish mathematician and astronomer who invented the eidograph (an improved pantograph).

== Life ==
Wallace's grave in Greyfriars Kirkyard, Edinburgh, 2012

Wallace was born at Dysart in Fife, the son of Alexander Wallace, a leather manufacturer, and his wife, Janet Simson. He received his school education in Dysart and Kirkcaldy.

In 1784 his family moved to Edinburgh, where he himself was set to learn the trade of a bookbinder. In 1790 he appears as "William Wallace, bookbinder" living and trading at Cowgatehead, at the east end of the Grassmarket.

His taste for mathematics had already developed, and he made such use of his leisure hours that before the completion of his apprenticeship he had made considerable progress in geometry, algebra and astronomy. He was further assisted in his studies by John Robison (1739–1805) and John Playfair, to whom his abilities had become known.

After various changes of employment, dictated mainly by a desire to have time for study, he became assistant teacher of mathematics in Perth Academy in 1794. In 1803, he was appointed to a mathematical mastership in the Royal Military College at Great Marlow; he continued in this post after it moved to Sandhurst, recommended by Playfair.

In 1804 he was elected a Fellow of the Royal Society of Edinburgh. His proposers were John Playfair, Thomas Charles Hope and William Wright.

In 1819 he was chosen to succeed John Playfair in the chair of mathematics at Edinburgh. Playfair's second chair (in Natural Philosophy) was taken by John Leslie.

Wallace developed a reputation for being an excellent teacher. Among his students was Mary Somerville. In 1838 he retired from the university due to ill health. In his final years he lived at 6 Lauriston Lane on the south side of Edinburgh.

He died in Edinburgh aged 74 and was buried in Greyfriars Kirkyard. The grave lies on the north-facing retaining wall in the centre of the northern section.

== Mathematical contributions ==
In his earlier years Wallace was an occasional contributor to Leybourne's Mathematical Repository and the Gentleman's Mathematical Companion. Between 1801 and 1810 he contributed articles on "Algebra", "Conic Sections", "Trigonometry", and several others in mathematical and physical science to the fourth edition of the Encyclopædia Britannica, and some of these were retained in subsequent editions from the fifth to the eighth inclusive. He was also the author of the principal mathematical articles in the Edinburgh Encyclopædia, edited by David Brewster. He also contributed many important papers to the Transactions of the Royal Society of Edinburgh.

He mainly worked in the field of geometry and in 1799 became the first to publish the concept of the Simson line, which erroneously was attributed to Robert Simson. In 1807 he proved a result about polygons with an equal area, that later became known as the Bolyai–Gerwien theorem. His most important contribution to British mathematics however was, that he was one of the first mathematicians introducing and promoting the advancement of the continental European version of calculus in Britain.

== Other works ==
Wallace also worked in astronomy and invented the eidograph, a mechanical device for scaling drawings.

== Books ==
- A Geometrical Treatise on the Conic Sections with an Appendix Containing Formulae for their Quadrature. (1838)
- Geometrical Theorems and Analytical Formulae with their application to the Solution of Certain Geodetical Problems and an Appendix. (1839)

== Family ==
Wallace was married to Janet Kerr (1775–1824).

His daughter, Margaret Wallace, married the mathematician Thomas Galloway. His sons included the Rev Alexander Wallace (1803–1842), William Wallace MD (1804–1864) and Archibald C. Wallace (1806–1830).
