= John Iredale (academic) =

British academic and medical doctor

Sir John Peter Iredale (born 1960) is a British academic and medical doctor. He is an Emeritus Professor of Experimental Medicine, at the University of Bristol and Chair of the Lister Institute for Preventative Medicine. He specialises in pancreatic and hepatobiliary medicine.

== Background ==
Iredale was born in Oxford on 9 November 1960. His father was the director of the Harwell laboratory of the UK Atomic Energy Authority in Oxfordshire. He attended the City of Oxford High School for Boys. In 1985, Iredale graduated with a Bachelor of Medicine with Honours from the University of Southampton.

== Career ==
Between 1991 and 2003, Iredale held a number of externally funded Medical Research Council Fellowships; he held a Training Fellowship, then a Clinician Scientist Fellowship, and then a Senior Clinical Fellowship. Iredale received a Doctor of Medicine from the University of Southampton in 1995. He carried out most or all of the work for the MRC Fellowships at the University of Southampton. From 1998 until 2004 he was Professor of Hepatology and from 2004 to 2006 a Professor of Medicine at the University.

In 2006, Iredale became a Consultant Hepatologist at Edinburgh Royal Infirmary, a role he remained in until 2016. Iredale also served as a Non-Executive Director of NHS Lothian between 2010 and 2016. He became Chair of Medicine at the University of Edinburgh in 2006, a role he served in until 2013. From 2013 to 2016 he was a Regius Professor of Medical Science at the university. While at the University of Edinburgh, Iredale also served as Vice Principal Health Services and Dean of Clinical Medicine. As of 2008, he was part of the MRC Centre for Regenerative Medicine and from 2008 to 2015 was Director of the MRC Centre for Inflammation Research at the University. Iredale left the University of Edinburgh in 2016.

Iredale joined the University of Bristol in 2016 as Pro Vice-Chancellor for Health and Life Sciences. From 2017 to 2021 he served as the chair of REF2021 Main Panel A. From 2016 to 2021. From 2016 to 2022 Iredale was a Medical Trustee with the British Heart Foundation. As of December 2021, Iredale was an Honorary Consultant and Non-Executive Director at North Bristol NHS Trust.

In January 2022, Iredale became Interim Executive Chair of the UK Medical Research Council, although he had been a member of the Council from 2016; he stepped down from his position as Pro Vice-Chancellor at the University of Bristol in order to carry out this interim role, but retained a role in the medical school as Professor of Experimental Medicine. In September 2022, Iredale became the Chair of the Lister Institute of Preventative Medicine, having previously been the Chair of the Scientific Advisory Committee of the Institute. In November 2023, Iredale chaired a roundtable by the UK Government Office for Science about human genome databases. As of December 2023, he was the Chair of the Cancer Research UK Scotland Institute's Board. He also holds two Honorary Consultant contracts at NHS trusts.

== Honours, Fellowships and Awards ==
Iredale's honours include a Fellowship of the Royal College of Physicians of London (1999), a Fellowship of the Academy of Medical Sciences (2003), a Fellowship of the Royal Society of Edinburgh (2012), and a Fellowship of the Royal College of Physicians of Edinburgh, He received a knighthood in 2024.

In July 2026, Iredale received an honorary Doctor of Science from the University of Southampton.
