= James Simpson (advocate) =

Scottish advocate and author

James Simpson (1781–1853) was a Scottish advocate and author.

== Life ==
He was born in Edinburgh, the son of William Simpson, minister of the Tron Church, Edinburgh, by his wife Jean Douglas Balderston. He was called to the bar in 1801. In early life he was acquainted with Sir Walter Scott, and was one of those who read Waverley before publication. In 1815 he visited the scene of the battle of Waterloo immediately after the event.

Simpson was one of the founders of the Edinburgh modern infant school, in which he tried solve the problem of religious education by permitting the parents to seIect the religious instructors themselves. Failing to receive adequate support, however, the school was ultimately sold to the kirk session of New Greyfriars. Simpson continued to support the cause of non-sectarian education, and lectured in England and Scotland on the subject. In 1837 he was a witness before the committee of the House of Commons on national education in Ireland, and his appearance lasted seven days.

Simpson died on 2 September 1853, at his house, 33 Northumberland Street Edinburgh.

== Works ==
Simpson published A Visit to Flanders and the Field of Waterloo, Edinburgh, 1815, which rapidly went through nine editions. In 1853 he returned to the subject with Paris after Waterloo, which included a tenth edition of his previous work. In 1823 Simpson was associated with George Combe and Andrew Combe in establishing the Phrenological Journal, to which he was a contributor till it ceased to appear in 1847.

Simpson's other works included:

- Letters to Sir Walter Scott on the Effects of the Visit to Scotland of George IV, Edinburgh, 1822.
- Hints on the Principles of a Constitutional Police, Edinburgh, 1822.
- The State of the Representation of Edinburgh in Parliament, Edinburgh, 1824.
- Necessity of Popular Education as a National Object, Edinburgh, 1834.
- The Philosophy of Education, Edinburgh, 1836.
- Lectures to the Working Classes, Edinburgh, 1844.

An essay of his On the Means of elevating the Profession of Educator in Public Estimation was published in the Educator, London, 1839, a collection of essays written for a prize offered by the Central Society of Education.
