= Henry Liston =

Scottish minister and inventor

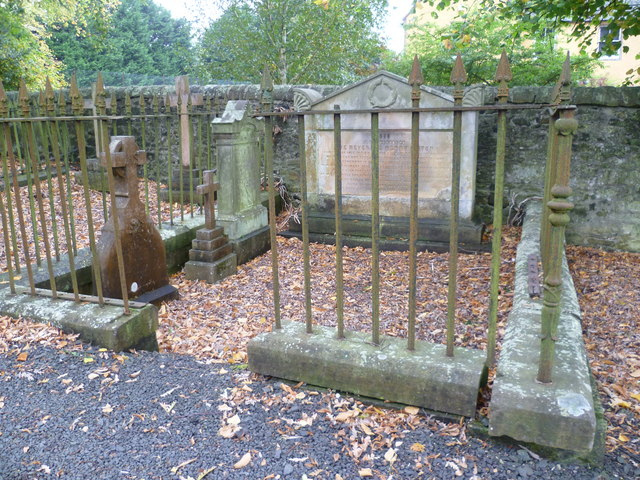
The graves of the Liston family at Ecclesmachan. The main stone was erected in memory of Henry Liston who was minister of the parish for 43 years.

Henry Liston (30 June 1771 – 24 February 1836) was a Scottish minister and inventor.

== Life ==
Born on 30 June 1771, he was the oldest son of Robert Liston, minister of Aberdour, Fife. He studied for the ministry and in 1793 became minister to the parish of Ecclesmachan, West Lothian, and was clerk of its presbytery and in 1820 he became conjunct clerk of the synod of Lothian and Tweeddale.

Liston died suddenly on 24 February 1836 at Merchison Hall, Falkirk.

== Works ==
Liston invented a special pipe organ he called the "Euharmonic Organ." It had a tuning with 58 pitches in the space of an octave for performing music in just intonation and was championed by John Farey Sr., who also directed attention to instruments developed for similar purposes by David Loeschman and William Hawkes. Liston used a series of pedals to change the pitch assigned to the keys of an ordinary keyboard, changing sharps and flats, as well as raising or lowering pitches by a major comma as required by the key of the music being performed. The first instrument was built in Edinburgh and had a separate pipe for each pitch. The second instrument was built by Flight and Robson in London, and used moveable shaders close to the mouth of the pipes in order to lower their pitch temporarily by one or two commas which reduced its cost and size, and with an improved bellows the system was the subject of a patent granted to Liston and Charles Broughton on 3 July 1810. After introducing the instrument in a session at the builder's showrooms in 1811, Liston published his "Essay on Perfect Intonation" (Edinburgh, 1812) describing its tuning, construction and operation along with a treatise on music theory and 40 pages of music .

Liston also patented an improved plough on 23 September 1813, claiming a special shape and an inclined wheel, which was locally used. He wrote the article "Music" for the Edinburgh Encyclopedia, and edited 'Horatii Flacei Opera Selecta' (1819) and the sixth book of Caesar for use in schools.

== Family ==
Liston married Margaret Ireland on 21 October 1793, and had issue:

- Robert Liston, F.R.C.S. (1794-1847), the famous London surgeon.
- Janet Liston (1796-1888)
- Anne Liston (1798-1802)
- David Liston (1799-1881), Professor of Oriental Languages at the University of Edinburgh
- Margaret Liston (1801-1866)

== Bibliography ==
- "Euharmonic Organ" (1830) Edinburgh Encyclopedia. William Blackwood, Edinburgh.
- "Liston, Henry" . Dictionary of National Biography. London: Smith, Elder & Co. 1885–1900.
