= Robert Liston (minister) =

Scottish clergyman (1730–1796)

Robert Liston (22 March 1730 – 11 February 1796) was a Scottish minister who served as Moderator of the General Assembly of the Church of Scotland in 1787/88.

== Life ==
Robert Liston, was born 22 March 1730, the son of John Liston (1687-1764), minister of Aberdour. The Liston family had been much involved in the Covenanter struggles. His great grandfather William had been sentenced to death for his part in the Battle of Rullion Green, though he fled and escaped. Robert began to attend school on 11 February 1735 and, when he was thirteen, he matriculated as a student at the University of Edinburgh on 13 October 1743. The age of 13/14 was the standard age to attend university at that time.

He was licensed to preach as a minister of the Church of Scotland by the Presbytery of Dunfermline on 5 September 1753. Some members of the Presbytery had opposed his father's original appointment as Minister, fighting it all the way up to the General Assembly. They felt he was being imposed on them by then Patron, Robert, Earl of Morton, and the rich Heritors of the Parish. Such disputes were common throughout Scotland at the time. One of those who had added his voice against John Lister's appointment, Ebenezer Erskine was to lead a number of Ministers out of the Church of Scotland as a protest against Patronage, forming the Original Secession Church.

Perhaps to avoid such disputes, several heritors and Elders of the Kirk Session of Aberdour in Fife wrote to James Douglas, 14th Earl of Morton, who now Patron of the Parish, shortly after Robert had been licensed, and asked that he be appointed assistant and expected successor to his father. This was agreed and he was called on 13 December and ordained on 2 April 1754 as assistant minister of Aberdour, under his father. Ten years later, on 17 September 1764, when his father died, he became the Minister of Aberdour.

As Minister of Aberdour, Robert Liston wrote the report for that parish.

== Moderator of the General Assembly ==
He was unanimously elected Moderator of the General Assembly of the Church of Scotland on 17 May 1787., the last person to be elected to that post who was not a Doctor of Divinity. This was a fairly routine meeting of the General Assembly. The King's Lord High Commissioner to the General Assembly of the Church of Scotland, David Melville, 6th Earl of Leven read the King's letter, assuring those assembled of his respect and admiration, advised them to avoid unnecessary disputations and to do all they can to encourage virtue and obedience to the law. The King also sent them £1000 to promote the Protestant religion (and loyalty to the throne) in the Highlands and Islands. A Committee of the Assembly drew up a reply, pledging their loyalty and devotion and promising to encourage their members to appreciate that they live in the freest country in the world with the most benign of monarchs. They thanked him for his £1000 and promised to put it to good use, especially in the more barbarous parts of the country (South Uist, Argyll and Glenelg) which were blighted with Popery and superstition.

It was brought to their notice that a Patron had advertised the sale of his Patronage over a Parish. This outraged the Assembly, who set up a committee to clarify the rules to avoid Simony. Other routine activity dealt with the training of divinity students and proper attendance at the General Assembly. Otherwise, it acted as a final court of appeal on a number of cases. The Patron of the Parish of Kilbarchan had died and his trustees had presented a Mr Maxwell, who was tutor to the family, to the Presbytery as the new Minister. The Presbytery of Paisley had objected that the Patronage had been willed to his son-in-law, who had not presented anyone, so the right had descended to them. The Assembly ordered the Presbytery to admit Mr Maxwell immediately as Minister of Kilbarchan. In another case, after much deliberation, it dismissed the appeal of Mr James Mcintosh, Minister of Moy and Dalarossie, and formally deposed him, for the offence of fornication, from the office of the holy ministry "for all time coming". It also dismissed the appeal of Thomas Rattray, Esquire, of Dalrulzian, against the Presbytery of Dunkeld, claiming he was not, as libelled, the father of the children of Isabel Downie.

The Assembly received petition from the Scots Church in Shelburne, Nova Scotia, asking for some help to build a church. The Assembly agreed to send them a message of support, but could not send any money in the current circumstances.

== Family ==
Liston married Janet Hardy, daughter of Henry Hardy/Hardie, parish minister of Culross, Fife on 11 November 1766. The Listons had the following issue:

- Anne Liston (1768-1852), married Rev Hugh Meiklejohn, minister of Abercorn, the later Moderator
- John Liston (1769-1805)
- Mary Liston (1770-1854)
- Rev Henry Liston (1771-1836), minister of Ecclesmachan, West Lothian
- Janet Liston (1772-1795)
- Robert Liston (1774-1808)
- Margaret Liston (1776-1825)
- Thomas Liston (1778-1862), Sheriff-clerk of West Lothian
- Rev William Liston (1781-1864), minister of Redgorton, Perthshire A keen botanist, he married Mary Forbes, and Mary Ann, one of his daughters, married Rev Adam Milroy, D.D., stepbrother of Mormon pioneer James Patten Paul, who in turn was the stepfather of Martha Hughes Cannon.
- Agnes Liston (1782-1860), married William McCall of Maidenhall, Cumberland, merchant in Liverpool

His children became, or married, ministers, lawyers, army officers and merchants. Two of his children, Henry and William, followed him into the Ministry. Henry declined the offer of the Kirk Session to be appointed his father's successor, feeling dynasties were not the proper thing for the Church of Scotland. He became parish minister of Ecclesmachan, and also an inventor.

Liston died on 11 February 1796. He was succeeded in his role as minister of Aberdour by Rev William Bryce DD. Liston's wife Janet died at Auldcathie, Hoptoun Park, on 31 December 1814.

== Publication ==
- Liston, Robert. "Parish of Aberdour, county of Fife (published 1792)". In Sir John Sinclair (ed.). The (Old) Statistical Account of Scotland. Vol. IV. Edinburgh: William Creech. pp. 327–336 – via The Statistical Accounts of Scotland.

== Sources ==
- The Scots Magazine Vol XLIX Sands, Brymer, Murray and Cochran, Edinburgh, 1787
- Struthers, John The history of Scotland, from the union to the abolition of the heritable jurisdictions in MDCCXLVIII Vol II, Blackie, Fullarton, & Co., Glasgow, 1828
- Woodrow, Robert & Burns, Robert The History of the Sufferings of the Church of Scotland, from the Restoration to the Revolution, Volume II, Blackie, Fullarton, & Co., Glasgow, 1829
- Acts of the General Assembly of the Church of Scotland 1787 Church Law Society, Edinburgh 1849 (British History Online)
- Ross, William Aberdour and Inchcolme; being historical notices of the parish and monastery, in twelve lectures David Douglas, Edinburgh, 1885
- McCall, Hardy Bertram Some Old Families: A Contribution to the Genealogical History of Scotland Birmingham, 1890 (Facsimile 2000 by Heritage Books, Bowie, Maryland, USA)
- Scott, Hew Fasti ecclesiae scoticanae; the succession of ministers in the Church of Scotland from the reformation New Edition Vol V Synods of Fife and of Angus and Mearns, Oliver and Boyd, Edinburgh 1925

== See also ==
- List of moderators of the General Assembly of the Church of Scotland

Church of Scotland titles
Preceded by Duncan Shaw	Moderator of the General Assembly of the Church of Scotland; 1787	Succeeded by Archibald Davidson
