= W.G. Liston =

Physician and medical entomologist (1872–1950)

- Born: 30 July 1872; Secunderabad
- Died: 18 October 1950 (aged 78)
- Alma mater: George Watson's College; University of Glasgow
- Employer: Haffkine Institute
- Branch: British Army, Indian Medical Service

Lieutenant Colonel William Glen Liston (30 July 1872 – 18 October 1950; sometimes published as W. Glen Liston) was a British Army doctor and medical entomologist who worked in the Indian Medical Service and was among the first experimenters to demonstrate that plague was transmitted by rat fleas and was involved in developing a plague vaccine.

Liston was born in Secunderabad where his father was an Army Chaplain. The surgeon Robert Liston, known for Liston's Splint, was a cousin of his father. Liston was sent to be educated at George Watson's College, Edinburgh followed by studies at the Albany Academy, Glasgow before joining Glasgow University to study medicine. A year after graduating he joined the Indian Medical Service in 1898. He was trained at the Army Medical School at Netley. His was posted to Secunderabad and shortly on arrival he was involved in research surrounding a plague outbreak at Bombay. A commission was sent from England that included T. R. Fraser from Edinburgh, Almroth Wright from Netley and M. A. Ruffer from Egypt. Liston was chosen to assist Wright and they established a laboratory in Bombay and began work. In 1901 the commission produced a report in five volumes. He also worked simultaneously on malaria and produced a monograph of the Indian Anopheles species along with S.P. James with illustrations by D.A. Turkhud. Liston was then recalled to England to work at Netley under Wright. He began to examine the suggestions that fleas were key in the spread of plague. In 1902 Liston received his MD and a Bellahouston gold medal from Glasgow for his studies on malaria. He returned to India in 1903 and was posted in Bombay to work under W.B. Bannerman and Waldemar Haffkine. The main investigations were on rat fleas but they were unable to demonstrate transmission of the plague through their bites. After examining guinea pigs that died from plague at the Bombay zoo, he decided that they could be used to trap fleas in homes. This experiment proved valuable and they were able to confirm transmission by the Oriental rat flea (Xenopsylla cheopis). He was then involved in development of a plague vaccine.

He retired and settled in Edinburgh and continued to work as a bacteriologist at the Royal College of Physicians’ Laboratory.
