= Aesculapian Club =

Medical dining club in Edinburgh, Scotland

The Aesculapian Club of Edinburgh
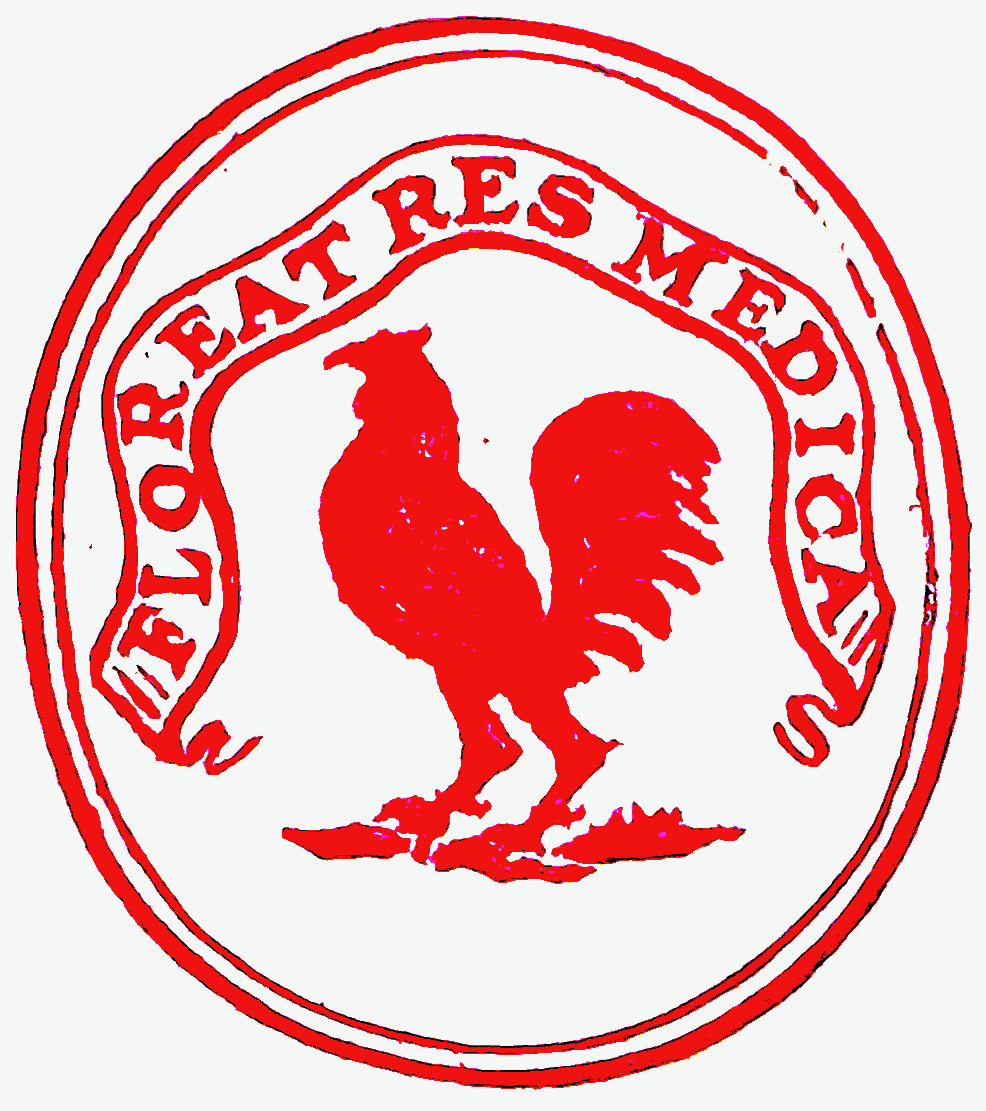
- The Aesculapian Club badge
- Formation: 1773
- Founder: Dr Andrew Duncan, and others
- Type: Medical dining club
- Purpose: To encourage convivial relations between Fellows of the two medical Royal Colleges in Edinburgh
- Location: Royal College of Physicians of Edinburgh

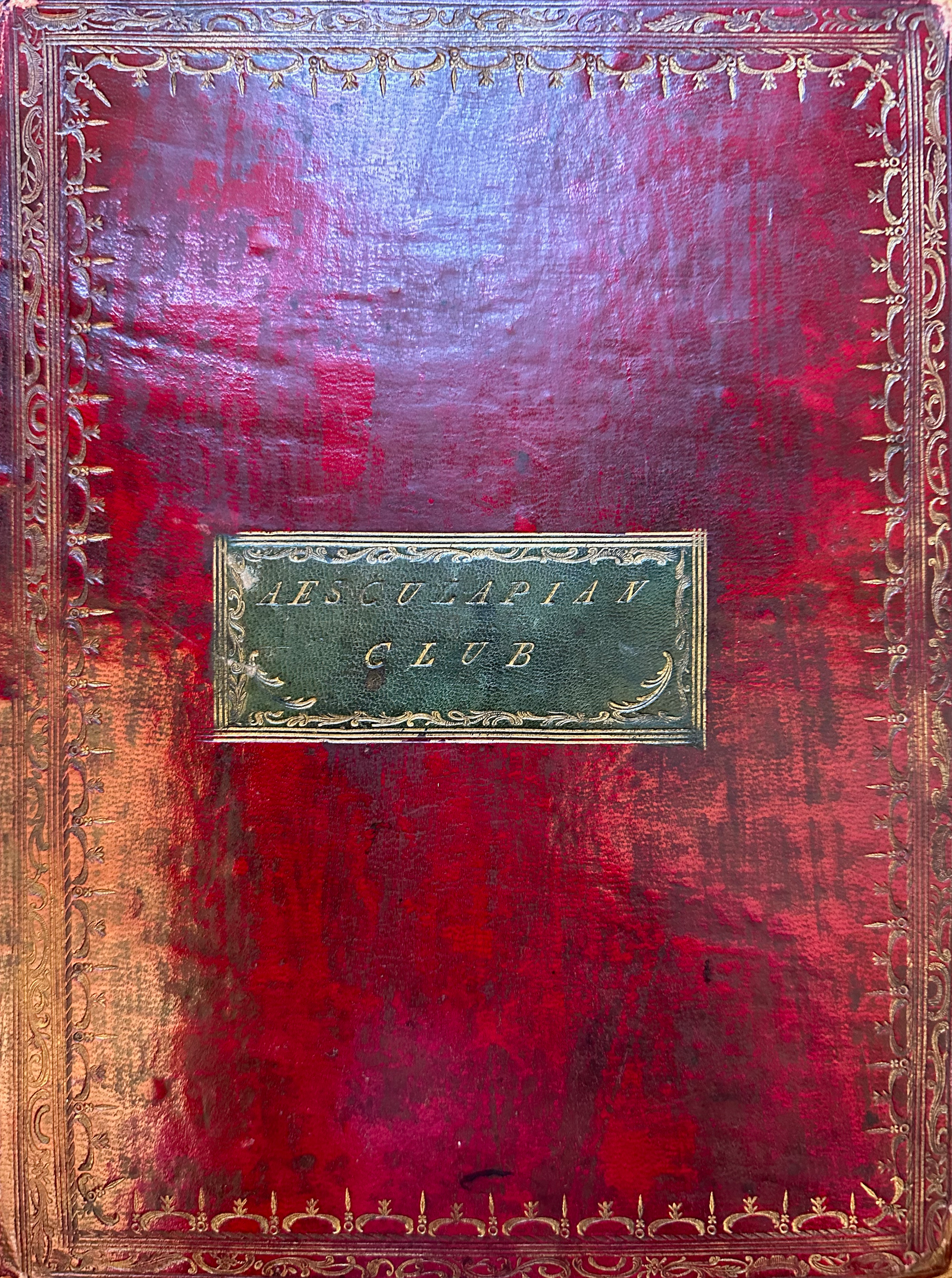
Original Minute Book of the Aesculapian Club

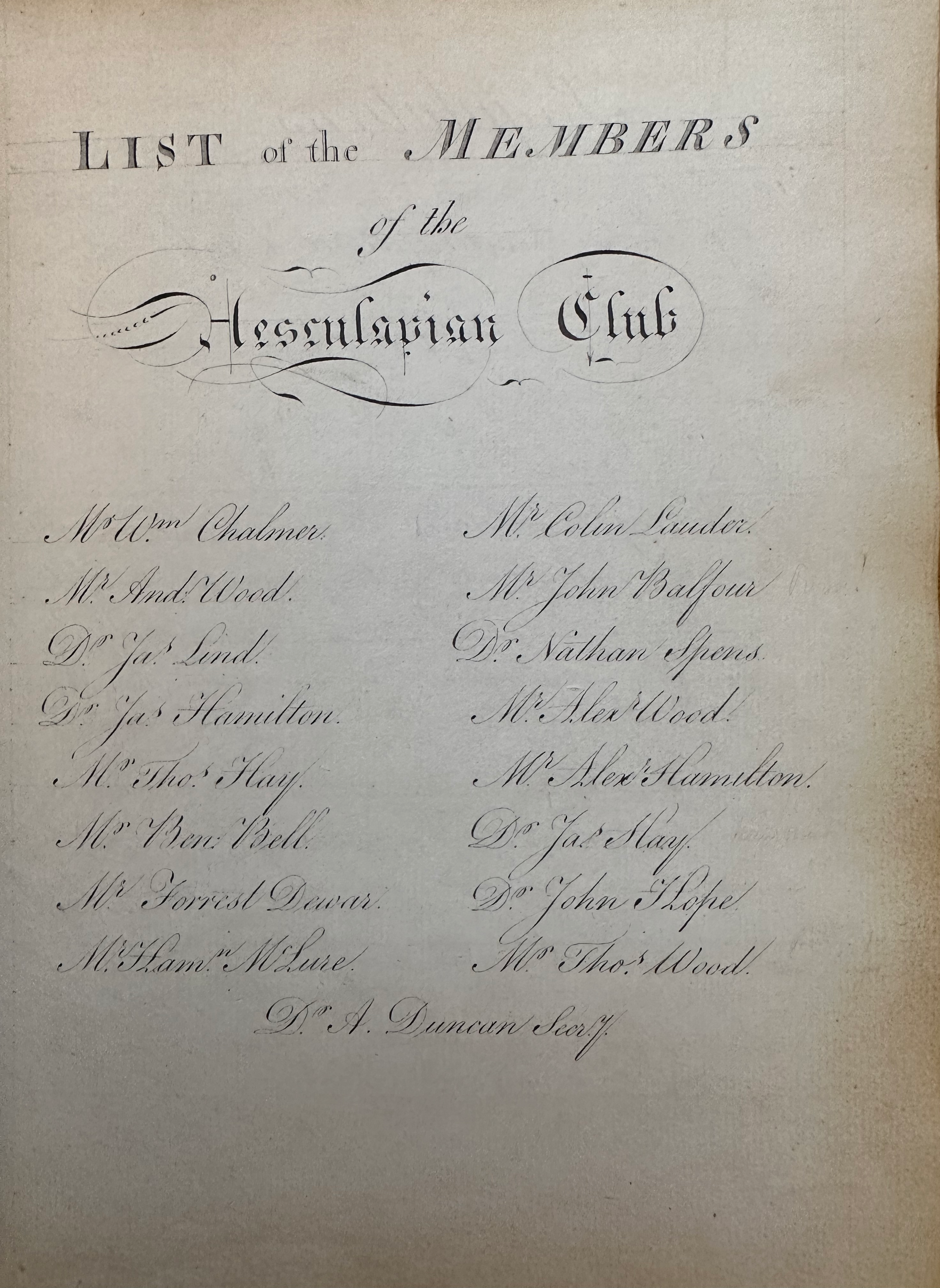
Extract from minutes of an early meeting of the Aesculapian Club

The Aesculapian Club of Edinburgh is one of the oldest medical dining clubs in the world. It was founded in April 1773 by Dr. Andrew Duncan. Membership of the club is limited to 11 Fellows of the Royal College of Physicians of Edinburgh and 11 Fellows of the Royal College of Surgeons of Edinburgh. 'Extraordinary Membership' is given to members aged over 70 years. The club was established during the Scottish Enlightenment to encourage convivial relations between Fellows of the two Colleges and to stimulate intellectual discussion. The Club dinners are held in the New Library of the Royal College of Physicians of Edinburgh on the 2nd Friday of March and October each year. The principal guest at each dinner is invited to give a short talk on a non-medical subject and this is followed by a round-table discussion.

== Founding members ==
There were 10 founding members of the Club who attended the first dinner on 2 April 1773. The minutes of that meeting record that 'The Aesculapian Club was conceived in a happy moment, and in due time brought forth. Doctors Duncan and Hamilton, Messrs Hay, Bell, McLure, and Dewar assisted at the birth on the first Friday of April 1773. They also stood as godfathers at the christening. The usual rites and ceremonies usual on these occasions, such as eating a good supper, etc., were concluded with a bumper recommendatory of the club to the peculiar care of Apollo, of Bacchus, and of Venus, Floreat Res Medica. Vivat Veritas.' The club was named after Asclepius, the Greek God of medicine, more usually known by the Roman name, Aesculapius. Aesculapius was the son of Apollo, who was himself both the God of physic and the sender of disease. The badge of the Club consists of the Latin motto 'Floreat Res Medica' (Let the medical field flourish) and a cockerel. Cockerels adorn many of the fixtures and fittings of the Royal College of Physicians of Edinburgh. In Greek mythology cockerels were dedicated to Apollo (because their crowing gave notice of the rising sun) and to Aesculapius (because their example of 'early to bed and early to rise' was associated with good health).

List of Founder Members
| Number | Name | Year of Election | Year of Resignation/Death |
|---|---|---|---|
| 1 | Dr. Andrew Duncan 'The Elder' | 1773 | Died 1828 |
| 2 | Mr. William Chalmer | 1773 | Died 1784 |
| 3 | Mr. Andrew Wood | 1773 | Resigned 1803 |
| 4 | Dr. James Lind | 1773 | Resigned 1774 |
| 5 | Dr. James Hamilton "Senior" | 1773 | Resigned 1798 |
| 6 | Mr. Benjamin Bell | 1773 | Resigned 1798 |
| 7 | Mr. Thomas Hay | 1773 | Resigned 1803-11 |
| 8 | Mr. Forrest Dewar | 1773 | Resigned 1803-11 |
| 9 | Mr. Hamilton McLure | 1773 | Died 1789 |
| 10 | Mr. Colin Lauder | 1773 | Resigned 1792 |

Many of these individuals were founder members of the Harveian Society of Edinburgh, which was established in 1782 and still meets on an annual basis.

== Former members and previous meetings ==
There have been 317 past and present members of the Aesculapian Club. Notable former Aesculpians include James Lind, Daniel Rutherford, Thomas Hope, James Syme, Sir James Young Simpson, Lord Joseph Lister, Joseph Bell, Douglas Argyll Robertson, Sir Thomas Clouston, Daniel Cunningham, James Haig Ferguson, Sir James Learmonth and Sir Stanley Davidson.

A photograph or picture of Aesculapians from 1821 to the present day is preserved in a 2-volume album. The first volume, which extends to 1939, is kept with other historic papers of the club (including the minutes of previous meetings) in the library of the Royal College of Physicians of Edinburgh. The Club owns a considerable number of silver cups or pocula and other table adornments. These include six silver cups with circular rows of hooks, on each of which is hung a medallion with the engraved name, date of election and crest of a former Aesculapian. Three of these cups were presented by the Gymnastic Club (also founded by Dr. Andrew Duncan) on its dissolution in 1836. One of the cups, which contains 9 medallions from 1788 to 1792, is on display in the National Museums of Scotland.

The Aesculapian Club was originally a supper club and met on the first Friday of every month in local taverns. In 1810, it was converted into a dinner club, with quarterly meetings in March, June, September and December in Edinburgh hotels. In 1924, the Royal College of Physicians of Edinburgh granted permission for the dinners to be held in the New Library. Although the frequency of dinners has been reduced over the years, the club has met almost continually since its inception. The only times when the Club did not meet were between March 1915 to December 1919 (due to the First World War), October 1939 to December 1945 (due to the Second World War) and March 2020 to October 2021 (due to the COVID pandemic). Several toasts are given throughout the dinner with the final one being "Floreat res medica"; this is a traditional toast, attributed to Andrew Duncan, which is given at the end of many medical dinners in Edinburgh.

== Current members and extraordinary members ==
List of current members and extraordinary members
| Number | Names | Year of Election | Membership Status |
|---|---|---|---|
| 264 | Professor Sir David C Carter | 1987 | Extraordinary (Surgeon) |
| 268 | Professor Sir Christopher RW Edwards | 1992 | Extraordinary (Physician) |
| 270 | Mr. Iain Macintyre | 1992 | Extraordinary (Surgeon) |
| 276 | Mr. Simon Paterson-Brown | 1998 | Surgeon |
| 278 | Dr. Niall Finlayson CBE | 2001 | Extraordinary (Physician) |
| 281 | Professor Ian Campbell | 2004-2008 | Extraordinary (Physician) |
| 282 | Dr. Nicholas Boon | 2004-2008 | Extraordinary (Physician) |
| 283 | Professor O James Garden CBE | 2004-2008 | Extraordinary (Surgeon) |
| 284 | Professor Sir John Savill | 2004-2008 | Extraordinary (Physician) |
| 285 | Professor Robert Steele CBE | 2008 | Extraordinary (Surgeon) |
| 286 | Dr. Kelvin 'Kel' Palmer | 2008-2010 | Extraordinary (Physician) |
| 287 | Professor Brian Williams | 2008-2010 | Extraordinary (Physician) |
| 288 | Mr Robert Jeffrey | 2008-2010 | Extraordinary (Surgeon) |
| 289 | Dr. Alastair MacGilchrist OBE | 2010 | Extraordinary (Physician) |
| 290 | Professor Allan Cumming | 2012 | Extraordinary (Physician) |
| 291 | Mr. James 'Sam' Patton | 2012 | Surgeon |
| 292 | Professor Michael Griffin OBE | 2012 | Extraordinary (Surgeon) |
| 293 | Professor James Hutchison | 2012 | Extraordinary (Surgeon) |
| 294 | Professor Sir John Iredale | 2013 | Physician |
| 295 | Mr. Murat Akyol | 2014 | Surgeon |
| 296 | Professor Mark WJ Strachan | 2014 | Physician |
| 298 | Professor Stephen Wigmore | 2014 | Surgeon |
| 299 | Professor Ian Finlay CBE | 2015 | Extraordinary (Surgeon) |
| 300 | Dr. Ian Penman | 2015 | Physician |
| 301 | Professor Colin Howie | 2015 | Extraordinary (Surgeon) |
| 302 | Professor Sir Andrew Morris CBE | 2015 | Physician |
| 303 | Professor John McKnight | 2016 | Physician |
| 304 | Professor Sir Lewis Ritchie OBE | 2018 | Extraordinary (Physician/GP) |
| 305 | Dr. Caroline Whitworth | 2020 | Physician |
| 306 | Professor Stephen Lawrie | 2022 | Physician (Psychiatrist) |
| 307 | Professor Angela Eleine Thomas OBE | 2022 | Physician (Haematologist) |
| 308 | Professor John Casey | 2022 | Surgeon |
| 309 | Ms. Rachel Guest | 2022 | Surgeon |
| 310 | Dr. Elaine Henry | 2023 | Physician |
| 311 | Professor Andrew Duckworth | 2024 | Surgeon |
| 312 | Professor Farhat Din | 2024 | Surgeon |
| 313 | Mr. David Boddie | 2024 | Surgeon |
| 314 | Professor Ewen Harrison OBE | 2025 | Surgeon |
| 315 | Mr. Donald Campbell | 2025 | Surgeon |
| 316 | Professor Dilip Patel | 2026 | Physician (Radiologist) |
| 317 | Professor Jane Norman | 2026 | Physician (Obstetrician) |

== Honorary Secretary ==
The Secretary of the Aesculapian Club acts also as the Treasurer and is responsible for the management of all affairs of the club. The Secretary is appointed ad vitam aut culpam. There have been 16 secretaries of the club: Dr. Andrew Duncan (1773-1827); Dr. Richard Huie (1827-1842); Dr. Robert Omond (1842-1877); Dr. Daniel Rutherford Haldane (1877-1887); Dr. John Smith Jr. (1887-1905); Dr. Charles Edward Underhill (1905-1908); Sir George Andreas Berry (1908-1924); Dr. William Fordyce (1924-1933); Dr. William James Stuart (1933-1949); Lt-Col Alexander Dron Stewart (1949–55); Professor Robert William Johnstone (1955-1958); Dr. Clifford Kennedy (1958-1978); Mr. Iain MacLaren 1978–2004; Dr. Anthony 'Tony' Douglas Toft (2004-2014); Dr. Kelvin 'Kel' Palmer (2014-2022); Professor Mark William John Strachan (2022–present). A badge for the Secretary was designed by Sir Andrew Douglas Maclagan in 1857. The badge consists of a silver medal bearing the name of the club with a series of silver bars on the ribbon, each inscribed with the name of a Secretary and their years of office.
