= William Brown (physician) =

American physician

William Brown (1748 - January 11 1792) was a physician, and a member of the American Philosophical Society, elected in 1780.

Raised in Maryland, Brown returned to his place of birth, Scotland, to study medicine at the University of Edinburgh, earning his M.D. in 1770. Returning to Alexandria, Virginia, Brown quickly established himself by opening a medical practice and starting a family. His skill attracted the attention of William Shippen, Jr. who recruited him in 1775 to join the Second Virginia Regiment as a surgeon. He spent a few months at the Flying Camp field hospital before landing at the military hospital at Bethlehem.

In 1777 Congress elected Brown Surgeon General. He spent a dismal winter with General George Washington in Valley Forge. His services were well used for the remainder of the war and, in recognition, he replaced Benjamin Rush as Physician General in 1788. Brown relocated to a new general hospital at Lititz, in Lancaster County, Pennsylvania where he made a number of changes to improve the facilities and capacities at the hospital, including sanitation improvements and assessing the supply of affordable medications for future wartimes. His list of medications became his Pharmacopeia Simpliciorum et Effecaciorum in usum Nocosomii Militaris, and was the first of its kind printed in the United States.

In 1779, he gave a series of lectures on anatomy for army surgeons in the region, as per the request of General George Washington. Brown resigned not long after that to resume his practice back in Virginia and died years later of unknown causes. He is buried at Pohick Episcopal Church in Lorton, Virginia.
