= Thomas Galloway =

19th-century Scottish mathematician

Thomas Galloway FRS (26 February 1796 – 1 November 1851) was a 19th-century Scottish mathematician.

== Life ==
He was born in Symington, South Lanarkshire, Scotland. In 1812 he entered the University of Edinburgh, where he distinguished himself in mathematics. In 1823 he was appointed one of the teachers of mathematics at the Royal Military College, Sandhurst, and in 1833 he became an actuary of the Amicable Life Assurance Office, the oldest institution of that kind in London, where he remained until his death in 1851. Galloway was a voluminous, though, for the most part, anonymous writer. His most notable paper, "On the proper motion of the solar system", was published in the Philosophical Transactions of 1847. He contributed largely to the seventh edition of Encyclopædia Britannica, and also wrote several scientific papers for the Edinburgh Review and various scientific journals. His Encyclopaedia article, "Probability", was published separately. He is buried in Kensal Green Cemetery, London.

== Family ==
Galloway married a daughter of the mathematician William Wallace, in 1831.
