= Andrew Morris (physician) =

British physician and medical scientist

Sir Andrew Morris CBE FRSE FMedSci
- Born: 7 October 1964 (age 61)
- Education: University of Glasgow
- Scientific career
- Fields: Medical informatics, health data
- Workplaces: University of Edinburgh; Health Data Research UK; Academy of Medical Sciences
- Website: www.hdruk.ac.uk/people/andrew-morris/

Andrew Morris CBE FRSE FMedSci is a British physician and medical informatics researcher. He is President of the Academy of Medical Sciences, inaugural Director of Health Data Research UK (HDR UK), and Professor of Medicine and Vice-Principal of Data Science at the University of Edinburgh. Morris has led large UK programmes linking health records, genetics and clinical research, and chaired the Scottish Government's COVID-19 Advisory Group during the pandemic.

== Early life and education ==
Morris was born on 7 October 1964. He graduated in medicine from the University of Glasgow in 1987 and trained in hospital medicine in Scotland and England before moving into academic medicine.

== Career ==
Morris was Dean of Medicine at the University of Dundee before moving to Edinburgh in 2014 as inaugural Director of the Usher Institute of Population Health Sciences and Informatics. From 2012 to 2017 he was Chief Scientist at the Scottish Government Health Directorate, where he developed policy on medical bioinformatics and data linkage. He became inaugural Director of HDR UK in 2017. He was elected President of the Academy of Medical Sciences in April 2024, succeeding Dame Anne Johnson. In 2025 he joined the board of trustees of Singapore's Agency for Science, Technology and Research (A*STAR).

== Research ==
Morris's research centres on health informatics, chronic disease and the use of population-scale data to improve healthcare. He was principal investigator of Generation Scotland, a cohort study of genetic and health data in tens of thousands of Scottish participants, and of the Scottish Health Informatics Programme and the Farr Institute in Scotland. In 2007 he co-founded Aridhia Informatics, a healthcare analytics company.

Under his direction, HDR UK has coordinated UK-wide access to linked health data for research across the NHS, universities, charities and industry. Early in 2024 HDR UK reported the first research study using health records spanning the whole UK population across all four nations.

During the COVID-19 pandemic Morris chaired the Scottish Government Chief Medical Officer's COVID-19 Advisory Group and was a participant in the UK's Scientific Advisory Group for Emergencies (SAGE). He later chaired the Scottish Government's Standing Committee on Pandemic Preparedness.

== Honours and awards ==
Morris was appointed Commander of the Order of the British Empire (CBE) in the 2018 New Year Honours for services to science in Scotland. He is a Fellow of the Royal Society of Edinburgh and the Academy of Medical Sciences, and received the Royal Medal of the Royal Society of Edinburgh in 2021. He was knighted in the 2026 Birthday Honours for services to medical sciences, public health and patient care.
