= Robert Liston =

British surgeon (1794–1847)

Robert Liston FRCSE FRCS FRS
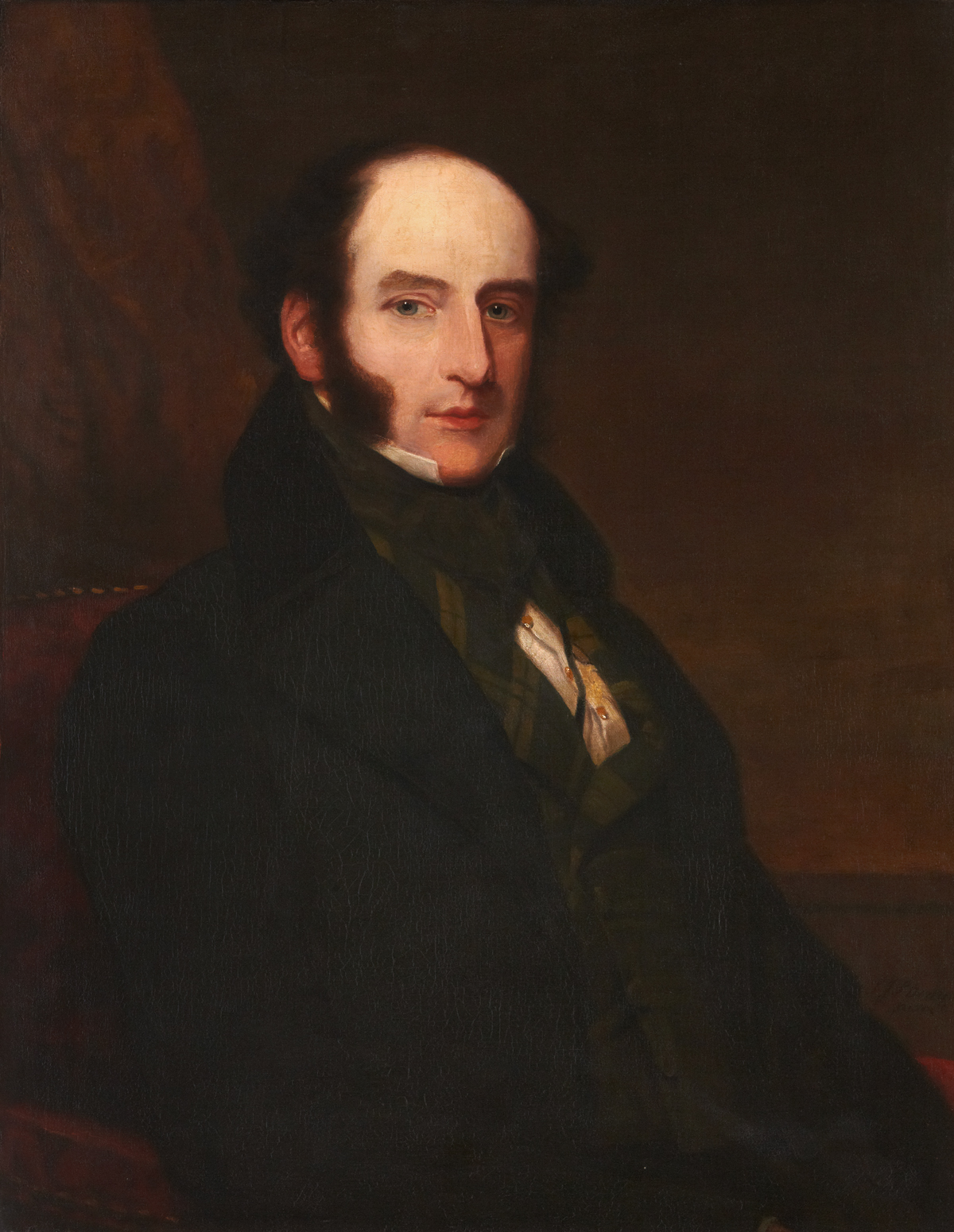
- Liston, 1847 portrait by Samuel John Stump
- Born: 28 October 1794; Ecclesmachan, West Lothian, Scotland, Kingdom of Great Britain
- Died: 7 December 1847 (aged 53); London, England, United Kingdom of Great Britain and Ireland
- Education: University of Edinburgh Medical School
- Occupation: Surgeon
- Years active: 1816−1847
- Scientific career
- Fields: Surgery

Robert Liston FRCSE FRCS FRS (28 October 1794 – 7 December 1847) was a Scottish surgeon. Liston was noted for his speed and skill in an era prior to anaesthetics, when speed made a difference in terms of pain and survival. He was the first Professor of Clinical Surgery at University College Hospital in London and performed the first public operation utilising modern anaesthesia in Europe.

== Early life and education ==
He was born in the manse of Ecclesmachan, the son of Margaret Ireland from Culross and her husband Rev Henry Liston a clergyman and an inventor, from Ecclesmachan in West Lothian west of Edinburgh. His grandfather – also Robert Liston – was the Moderator of the General Assembly of the Church of Scotland. (Note: The difference in pagination between the 1983 and 2001 editions is attributable to the fact that for the 1983 edition, the frontispiece is counted as page 1, with printed page numbering commencing at page 13, which is the first chapter, on Robert Liston. Conversely, the online edition commences numbered pagination at chapter one. A comparison of the 1983 edition and the viewable online text shows no discernible deletions of text. Certainly chapter one appears word-for-word, as does chapter 11 (Disastrous Motherhood). In the latter case, the 1983 pagination encompasses four pages, whereas the online book encompasses three. However, the text is the same. The 1983 edition has each sequential chapter commencing on the same page as the preceding chapter ends, which causes a greater page range for some chapters. The online edition has each chapter commencing on its own page. Text is compressed so that there are more words per line, but of the text is verbatim for that able to be compared.)

After a local education both from his father and in Abercorn village school, Liston started studying at Edinburgh Medical School from 1808. In 1810 he became assistant to his tutor Dr. John Barclay. In 1816, he went to London for a year to train under William Blizard. He returned to Edinburgh to teach anatomy alongside James Syme. He was then living at 95 Princes Street – a fine house facing Edinburgh Castle. In 1820, he married the daughter of Adam Crawford, a Leith wine merchant.

== Career ==
In 1818, he had become house surgeon in The Royal Infirmary of Edinburgh under Dr George Bell. However, he was dismissed in 1822 due to disagreements with Bell and not reinstated until 1827. In 1828, he was promoted to operating surgeon.

He became first "The Northern Anatomist" of Blackwood’s Magazine. In 1832/1833, he is listed as living at 99 George Street in the centre of Edinburgh's New Town. In 1833, he applied for Edinburgh's Professorship of Anatomy but was beaten by James Syme (five years his junior) who had a much better aptitude for teaching. Liston then left Edinburgh and relocated to London.

For the last seven years of his life he lived at 5 Clifford Street, off Bond Street in Mayfair, in a building and area now of historical significance, hence Richard Gordon's specific mention of this address in his section on Robert Liston.

He was elected a Fellow of the Royal Society in 1841.

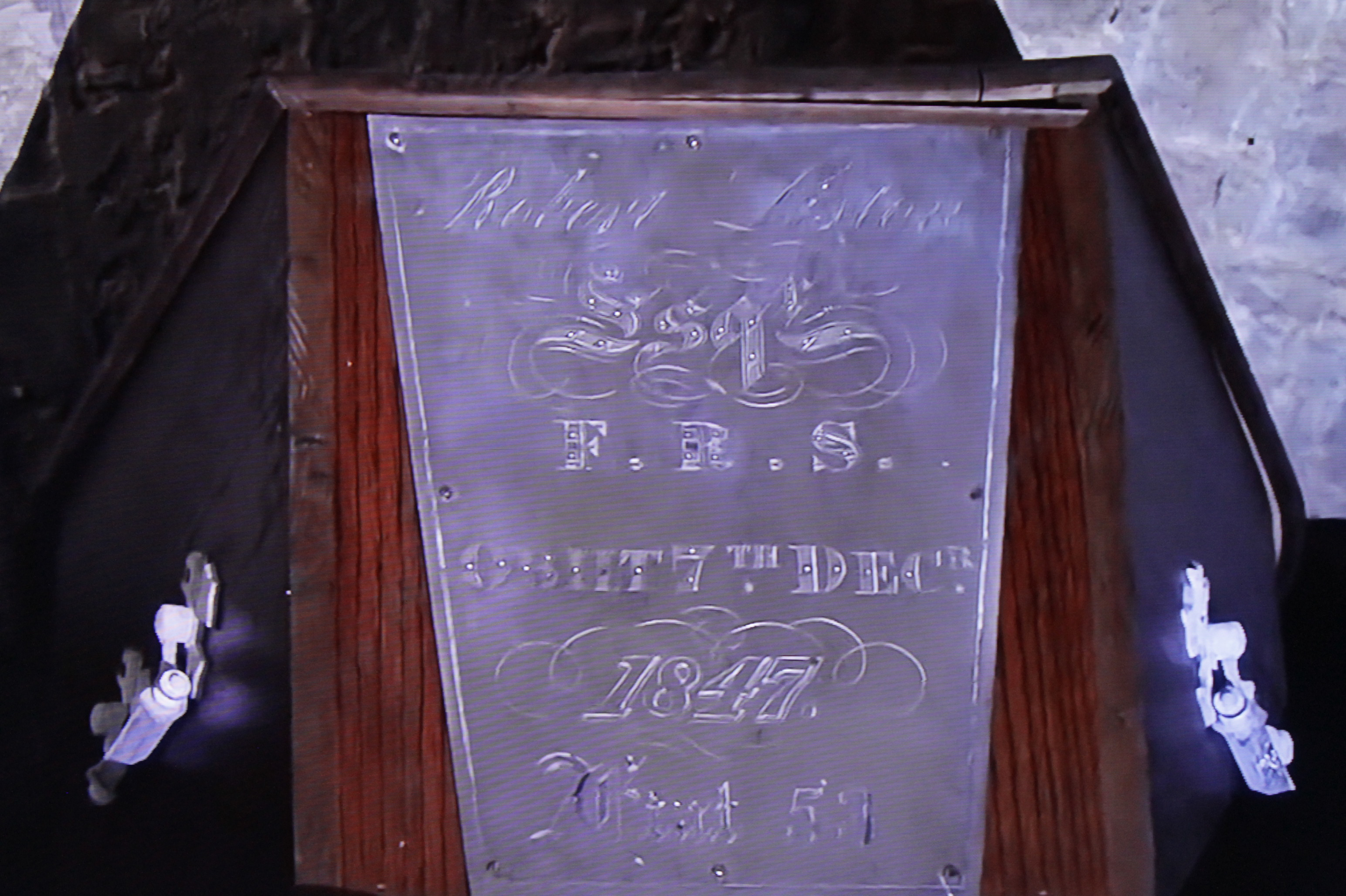
The coffin of Robert Liston FRS in the Terrace Catacombs, Highgate Cemetery

== Death ==
He died, aged 53, of a ruptured aortic aneurysm on 7 December 1847 at his Mayfair home, and his funeral took place at St Michael's Church, Highgate, six days later. The funeral procession from his home consisted of five mourning coaches and 15 private carriages. In the former were relatives and his fellow medical professors of University College, and in the latter were friends of eminence in the higher ranks of society. Near the cemetery, the cortege was met by 400 of his former pupils, and by about 200 medical practitioners and others. He was buried on the western side of Highgate Cemetery in the Terrace Catacombs.

== Legacy ==
Liston's legacy comprises both that which has made its way into the popular culture, and that found primarily within the medical fraternity and related disciplines.

In 1837, he published Practical Surgery, arguing the importance of quick surgeries; "these operations must be set about with determination and completed rapidly."

Liston's image has been preserved in both bust and portrait form. Following Liston's death, a meeting was held of his friends and admirers, who "unanimously resolved to establish some public and lasting Testimonial to the memory of this distinguished surgeon". A committee of some 78 people was formed, which resolved that the testimonial should consist of a marble statue to be placed in some designated public spot, and the inauguration of a gold medal, to be called the "Liston Medal", "and awarded annually, as the Council of University College, may decide".

=== Reputation ===
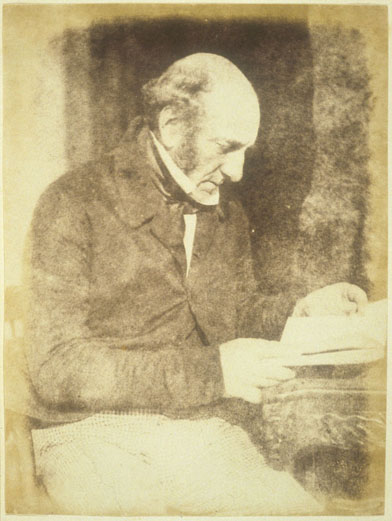
Robert Liston, photograph circa 1845 by Hill & Adamson

Richard Gordon describes Liston as "the fastest knife in the West End. He could amputate a leg in 2 1/2 minutes." He is reputed to have been able to complete operations in a matter of seconds, at a time when speed was essential to reduce pain and improve the odds of survival of a patient.

In Florence Nightingale's Notes on Nursing, she states "there are many physical operations where ceteris paribus (all else being equal) the danger is in a direct ratio to the time the operation lasts; and ceteris paribus the operator's success will be in direct ratio to his quickness." (Note: There are several publications of Notes on Nursing, including online versions. The exact pagination will depend on such things as prefaces and introductory chapters on Nightingale. There may be additional variations in online sources. Some online versions may even not contain some footnotes or margin notes from Nightingale's book. However, the online source cited at the same time as this footnote, does have Nightingale's footnote on page 30.)

Gordon described the scene thus:

He was six foot two, and operated in a bottle-green coat with wellington boots. He sprung across the blood-stained boards upon his swooning, sweating, strapped-down patient like a duelist, calling, 'Time me gentlemen, time me!' to students craning with pocket watches from the iron-railinged galleries. Everyone swore that the first flash of his knife was followed so swiftly by the rasp of saw on bone that sight and sound seemed simultaneous. To free both hands, he would clasp the bloody knife between his teeth.

Gordon's prose is more than just caricature. He describes how the link between surgical hygiene and iatrogenic infection was poorly understood at that time. At an address by Dr Oliver Wendell Holmes to the Boston Society for Medical Improvement on 13 February 1843, his suggestions for hygiene improvement to reduce obstetric infections and mortality from puerperal fever "outraged obstetricians, particularly in Philadelphia". In those days, "surgeons operated in blood-stiffened frock coats – the stiffer the coat, the prouder the busy surgeon", "pus was as inseparable from surgery as blood", and "Cleanliness was next to prudishness". He quotes Sir Frederick Treves on that era: "There was no object in being clean...Indeed, cleanliness was out of place. It was considered to be finicking and affected. An executioner might as well manicure his nails before chopping off a head." The connection between surgical hygiene, infection, and maternal mortality rates at Vienna General Hospital was only made in 1847 by Vienna physician Dr Ignaz Philipp Semmelweis from Hungary, after a close colleague of his died. He instituted the hygiene practices exhorted by Holmes, and the mortality rate fell.

Such was the era in which Liston lived. Gordon states that Liston was "an abrupt, abrasive, argumentative man, unfailingly charitable to the poor and tender to the sick (who) was vilely unpopular to his fellow surgeons at the Edinburgh Royal Infirmary. He relished operating successfully in the reeking tenements of the Grassmarket and Lawnmarket on patients they had discharged as hopelessly incurable. They conspired to bar him from the wards, banished him south, where he became professor of surgery at University College Hospital and made a fortune".

In writings on Liston, he is portrayed as a man of strong character and ethics, which was the source of some of his confrontational style. In one case, he confronted a medical colleague (Dr Robert Knox) over the treatment of a young woman (Mary Paterson) who it later transpired was murdered (see Burke and Hare murders), with Knox thought complicit in the murder. She was in Knox's dissecting rooms within four hours of her death, and kept in whisky for three months before dissection, during which time she was essentially on voyeuristic display. Liston's response is documented in a letter from him:

According to Liston, he saw Mary Paterson's body in Knox's rooms and immediately suspected foul play. He knocked Knox down after an altercation in front of his students – Liston assumed some students had slept with her when she was alive, and that they should dissect her body offended his sense of decency. He removed her body for burial.

=== Liston's firsts ===
While Liston's pioneering contributions are paid tribute within popular culture such as Richard Gordon, they are best known within the medical fraternity and related disciplines.

- Liston became the first Professor of Clinical Surgery at University College Hospital in London in 1835.
- He performed the first public operation utilising modern anaesthesia, ether, in Europe on 21 December 1846 at the University College Hospital. His comment at the time: "This Yankee dodge beats mesmerism hollow", referring to William T. G. Morton's experimentations with ether as an anaesthetic for extraction of teeth. See the History of general anesthesia.
  - This left a lasting impact on two of Liston's students: James Simpson, who would go on to be a pioneer of chloroform's use as an anaesthetic; and Joseph Lister, who pioneered aseptic technique.
- He invented see-through isinglass sticking plaster, bulldog forceps (a type of locking artery forceps), and a leg splint used to stabilise dislocations and fractures of the femur, and still used today.

=== Liston's most famous case ===
Although Richard Gordon's 1983 book pays tribute to other aspects of Liston's character and legacy as noted elsewhere in this article, it is his description of some of Liston's most famous cases which has primarily made its way into what is known of Liston in popular culture. Gordon describes what he calls Liston's most famous case in his book, as quoted verbatim below.

Amputated the leg in under 2 1/2 minutes (the patient died afterwards in the ward from hospital gangrene; they usually did in those pre-Listerian days). He amputated in addition the fingers of his young assistant (who died afterwards in the ward from hospital gangrene). He also slashed through the coat tails of a distinguished surgical spectator, who was so terrified that the knife had pierced his vitals he fainted from fright (and was later discovered to have died from shock).

— Richard Gordon

This episode has since been dubbed as the only known surgery in history with a 300 percent mortality rate. The situation that Gordon labels "Liston's most famous case" has been described as "possibly apocryphal". No primary sources confirm that this surgery ever took place.

== Publications by Liston ==
- "Cases of Aneurism; Fracture of the Femur; Case of Aneurism", The Edinburgh Medical and Surgical Journal, vol. 16, pp. 66–74, 212–215, 348–352, 1820
- "Spontaneous Mortification – Case occurring in the upper extremity", The Lancet, Lectures Delivered at the North London Hospital, by Robert Liston, Esq., Lecture IX, 1 (602): 846–851, 14 March 1835, doi:10.1016/s0140-6736(02)96871-6, S2CID 51697598
- Liston, R. (1837), "Observations on Some Tumours of The Mouth and Jaws", Medico-Chirurgical Transactions, 20 (1): 165–199, doi:10.1177/095952873702000112, PMC 2116728, PMID 20895635 Also via Google books (Note: The volume listing for Google is incorrect, as evidenced by the first page which clearly states "volume the twentieth").
- Practical Surgery, with One Hundred and Twenty Engravings on Wood. London: John Churchill & Henry Renshaw. 1837. Full text at Internet Archive (archive.org)
- American edition (1838). Practical Surgery, with Notes and Additional Illustrations by George W. Norris, one of the surgeons to the Pennsylvania Hospital. Philadelphia: James Crissey. Full text at Internet Archive (archive.org)
- Elements of Surgery (2 ed.). London: Longman, Orme, Brown, Green & Longmans. 1840. Full text at Internet Archive (archive.org)
- Elements of Surgery. With Copious Notes and Additions by Samuel D. Gross, M.D. Illustrated with Numerous Engravings. Simultaneously published in: New York, by J. & H.G. Langley; Charlestone, S.C., by WM. H. Berrett; Richmond, V.A., by Smith, Drinker & Morris; Louisville, KY, by James Maxwell, Jr (American (1842) from the 2nd London ed.). Philadelphia: Ed. Barrington & Geo D. Hasswell. Full text at Internet Archive (archive.org)
- "A Course of Lectures on the Operations of Surgery, and of Diseases and Accidents Requiring Operations: Lecture IX", The Lancet, 2 (1102): 65–68, 12 October 1844, doi:10.1016/s0140-6736(02)64540-4
- "On Fracture of the Neck of the Femur", Dissertations by Eminent Members of the Royal Medical Society, Paper read on 1820, Edinburgh: David Douglas, 1892 See also BiblioLife reproduction via Google

== See also ==
- William Fergusson
- James Syme
- James Simpson
