= James Grahame =

Scottish poet (1765–1811)

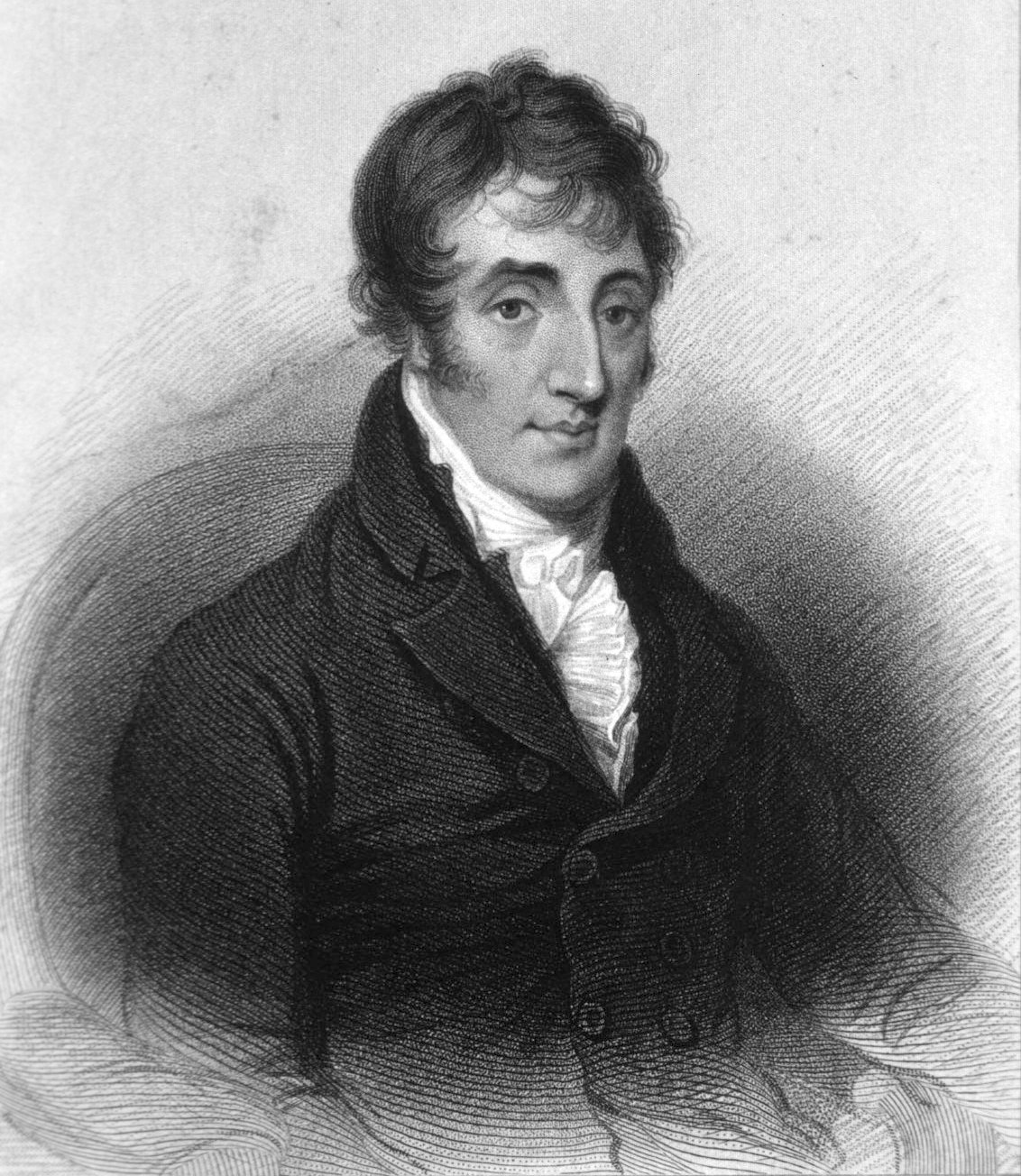
James Grahame

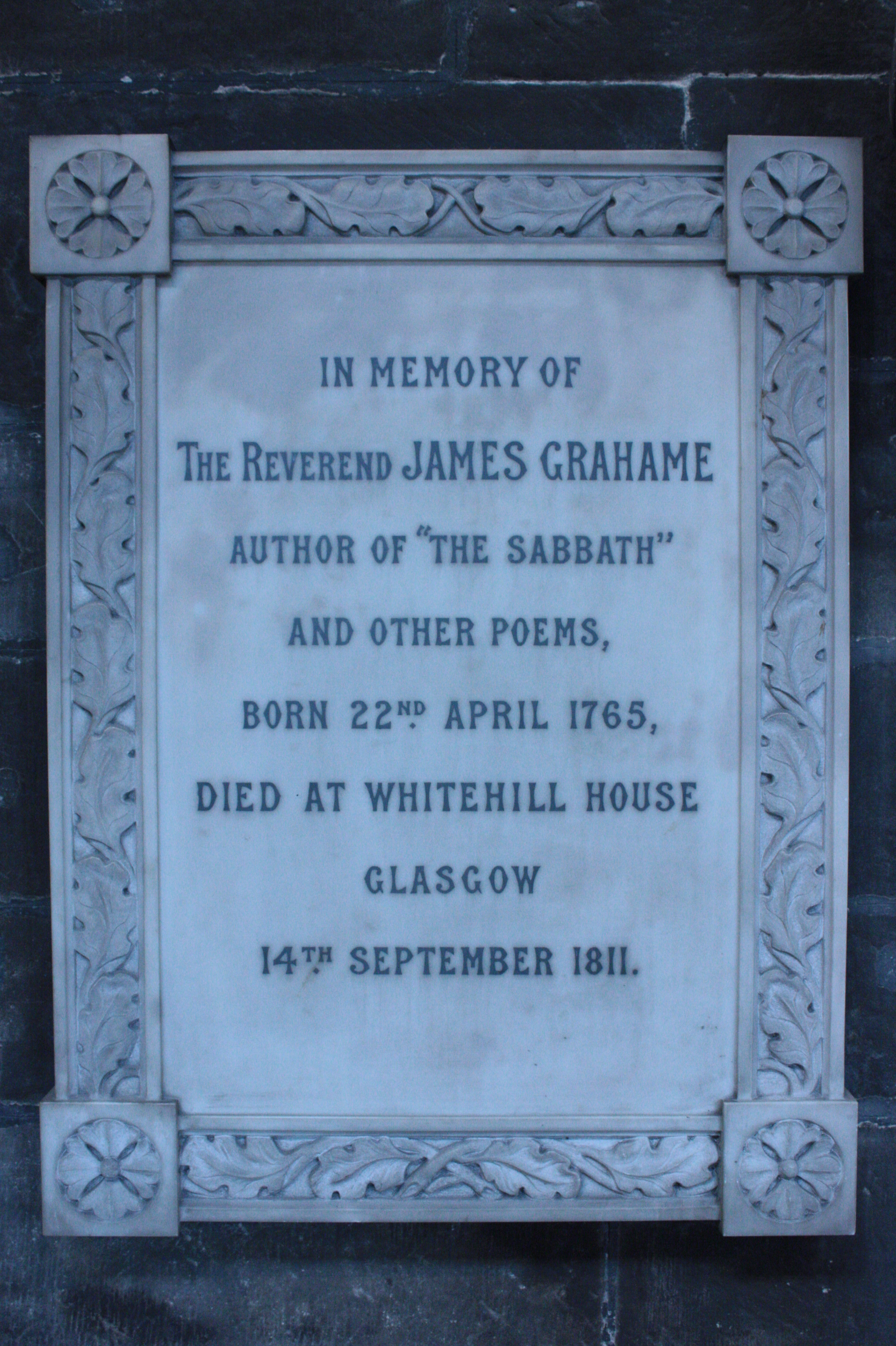
Memorial to Rev James Grahame, Glasgow Cathedral

Rev James Grahame (22 April 1765 – 14 September 1811) was a Scottish poet. His best-known poem, The Sabbath, combines devotional feeling with vivid description of Scottish scenery.

== Early life ==
He was born at Whitehill House in Glasgow, the son of Thomas Grahame, a successful lawyer. His elder brother was Robert Grahame of Whitehill. He attended University of Glasgow.

== Career ==
After completing his literary course at the University of Glasgow, Grahame went in 1784 to Edinburgh, where he worked as a legal clerk, and was called to the Scottish bar in 1795. However, he had always wanted to go in for the Church, and when he was 44 he took Anglican orders, and became a curate first at Shipton, Gloucestershire, and then at Sedgefield, Durham.

His works include a dramatic poem, Mary Queen of Scots (1801), The Sabbath (1804), The Birds of Scotland (1806), British Georgics (1809), and Poems on the Abolition of the Slave Trade in a joint volume on the subject with Elizabeth Benger and James Montgomery (1809). His principal work, The Sabbath, a sacred and descriptive poem in blank verse, is characterized by devotional feeling and by happy delineation of Scottish scenery. In the notes to his poems he expresses enlightened views on popular education, the criminal law and other public questions. He was emphatically a friend of humanity—a philanthropist as well as a poet.

A satirical reference to "Sepulchral Grahame" is found in Lord Byron's English Bards and Scotch Reviewers.

== Personal life ==
James Grahame was married to Janet Grahame, eldest daughter of Richard Grahame, Esq. They had two sons and a daughter.

James Grahame died at Whitehill House, his brother Robert's home in Glasgow, on 14 September 1811.

=== Memorials ===
A memorial to Grahame lies on the inner north wall of Glasgow Cathedral.
