= Ecclesmachan =

Village in West Lothian

Coordinates: 55.947°N 3.509°W

Ecclesmachan: Scottish Gaelic: Eaglais Mhachain
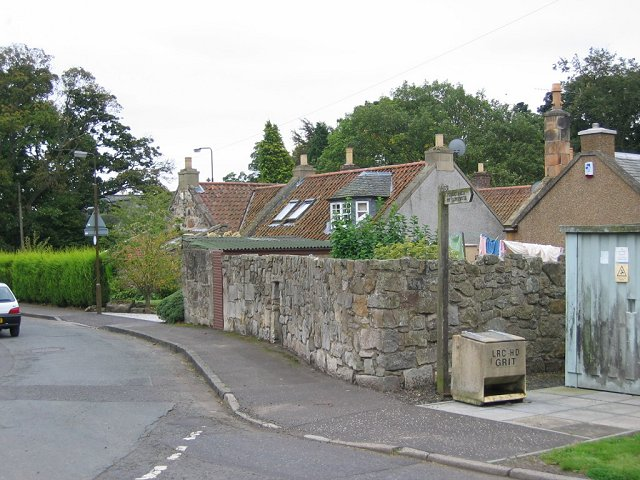
- Cottages in Ecclesmachan

- Location within West Lothian
- OS grid reference: NT057736
- Council area: West Lothian
- Lieutenancy area: West Lothian
- Country: Scotland
- Sovereign state: United Kingdom
- Post town: BROXBURN
- Postcode district: EH52
- Dialling code: 01506
- Police: Scotland
- Fire: Scottish
- Ambulance: Scottish
- UK Parliament: Livingston
- Scottish Parliament: Linlithgow

Ecclesmachan (Gaelic: Eaglais Mhachain) (Welsh: Eglwys Machan) (NT058736) is an historic village in West Lothian. It lies just north of Uphall on the B8046 road and just south of Threemiletown. The village is notable for its medieval origin parish church. As at 2001, the population of the civil parish of Ecclesmachan was 529 and was 811 in 1991.

== History ==
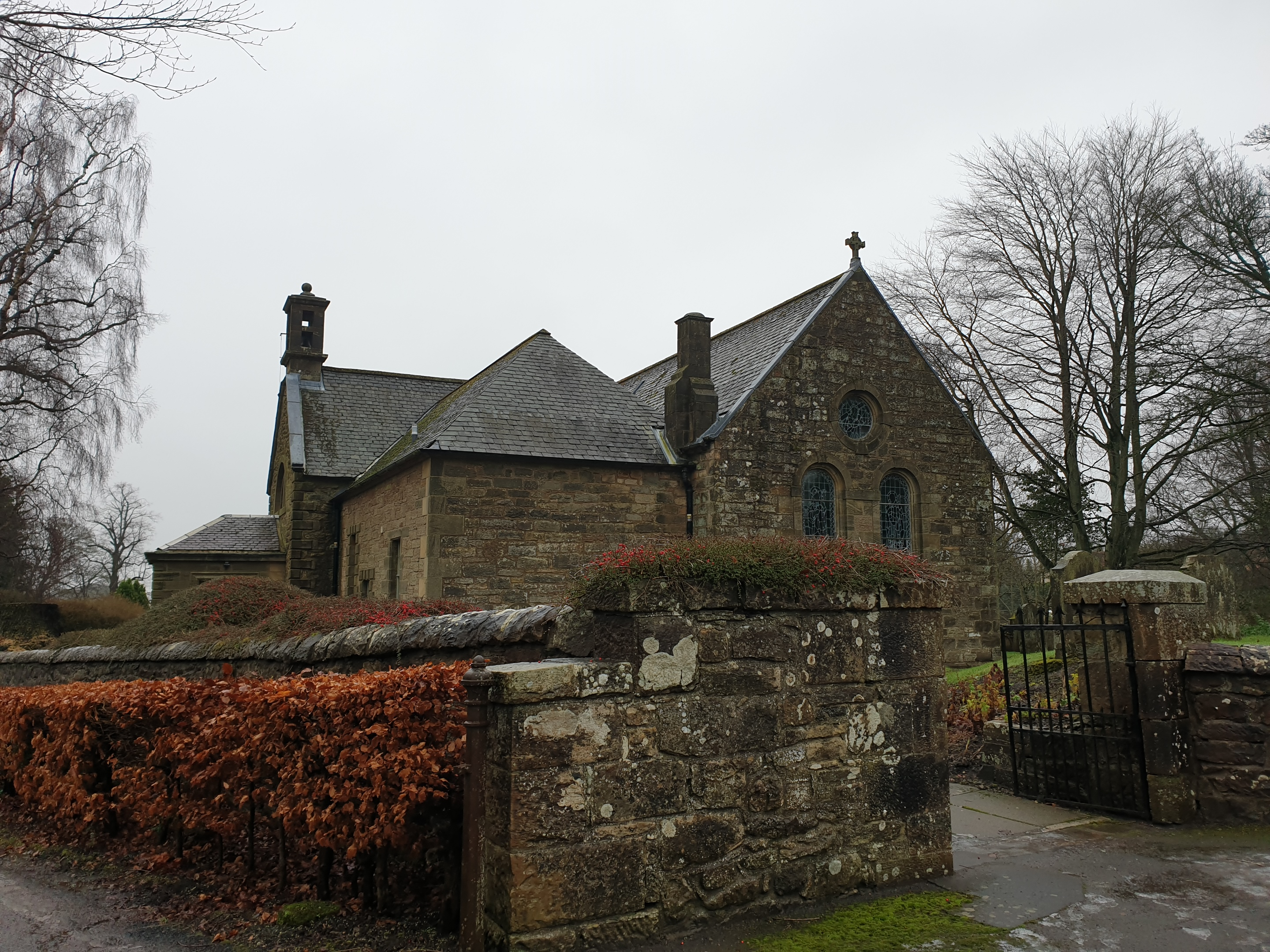
Ecclesmachan Church

The name means 'church of Saint Machan', and its form is thought to show that a church was present in the area in Sub-Roman times. However, it is not clear whether the name was coined in Gaelic or in the earlier Celtic language Cumbric (Old Welsh).

Ecclesmachan parish church is medieval in origin and dates to the 13th century (consecrated in 1244), although it was extensively altered in the 18th century. The Building is Category B listed and retains an arched Norman style doorway. The Church was extended in 1710 and again in 1908, with a porch added. A date of 1710 is inscribed on one lintel. The most recent major remodelling dates from 1908 and was undertaken by John Honeyman. Stained glass in the interior is by Ballantine & Son. The church was once under the care of the Templars via Torphichen receptory and in fact the graveyard contains several examples of Templar symbology. The graveyard contains several elaborate pre-19th century stone gravestones, with depictions of skulls, angels and other carvings. The adjacent mid 19th century L-shaped Manse house is intact and has some earlier structural parts.

Smiddy cottage in the village is a former blacksmiths converted into a home by Walter Wood that is Category C listed.

The village has a new cemetery which lies in a hollow at the foot of a fairly steep lane opposite the Church. It contains a large number of war graves given the small size of the village and many of the unmarked graves (566) contain the unclaimed bodies of patients who died at the nearby Bangour Village Hospital.

Binny House is an early 19th century Georgian mansion house on the southern edge of the village. The building, as well as its doocot and gatehouses are Category B listed. The building is currently abandoned, however the adjacent former walled garden of the estate is in use as a garden centre named Binny Plants. The estate was once owned by Thomson of Binny and a Category C listed memorial in the Gothic revival style, dated 1873 is on the estate.

Ecclesmachan is best known for its countryside views, one being the Binny Craig. One of Ecclesmachans attractions is the bomb hole, it is near the Binny Craig. The bomb was meant to hit the Forth Bridge. This was during World War II.

Ecclesmachan had some improvements made in 2009; there was a refurbishment made to the garages after they were found to contain asbestos; West Lothian council paid to get the garages redone, and after 2–3 months the garages were finished. Other improvements included getting a Basketball net put in the local park and getting a Rugby field put up; the field it is in is closer to Oatridge College than to the village itself, but was made for the villagers to use.

=== The Old school and village hall ===
Around the 19th and 20th century, there was a school in Ecclesmachan. It was a highly populated school, as it was the only one in the Threemiletown area. Not much is known about the school, but a report by the H.M. Inspector on the Public School in Ecclesmachan stated; 'It has been long celebrated as one of the best schools for many miles around, and the large number of children attending it from other parishes, speaks for itself'. The report went on to describe the Schoolmaster (Mr Cunningham), as 'totally devoted to his work and makes his school his first work'. The school was closed in July 1951 by the local authority due to the roll being only 6 pupils. The schoolhouse was built 1840 and was subsequently enlarged by the architects Honeyman, Keppie and MacKintosh. The ‘Old school’ is now used as the village hall. The village hall was refurbished in 2011, improvements were made in the toilet facilities, the lighting and the hall itself. Inside the hall there is a plaque that is dedicated to the war heroes that fought in World War I. There is a cemetery near the hall where some of the war heroes are buried. The hall is usually used at Christmas and Galaday times. The hall is also used for OAP and Toddler clubs.

== Economy ==
Ecclesmachan is home to Oatridge Agricultural College (built in 1972), a 283 hectare education facility. The college is a campus of Scotland’s Rural College (SRUC). Scotland’s Rural College (SRUC) was established in 2012 through the merger of the Scottish Agricultural College (SAC) with Barony, Elmwood and Oatridge Colleges. The college offers courses in agriculture, land use, agricultural technology, veterinary nursing, as well as environmental and rural business management.

The village is also home to the Scottish National Equestrian Centre (SNEC) which opened in 2007. There are regular Horse riding contests every weekend, and even through the week.

=== Binny Stone ===
At least six quarries encircled the village at one time, producing stone of good quality and particularly suited to carving. The stone contains bitumen giving it a freckled appearance. Its most noteworthy use is on the Scott Monument on Princes Street in Edinburgh. The main quarry, was located east of Binny House and employed up to 50 people in the mid 19th century.

== Notable residents ==
Notable natives include the surgeon Robert Liston (whose father was a Minister of the Parish), Jacobite poet William Hamilton and Stephen Mitchell (Tobacco manufacturer and philanthropist).
