= Scottish Enlightenment =

Intellectual movement in 18th–19th century Scotland

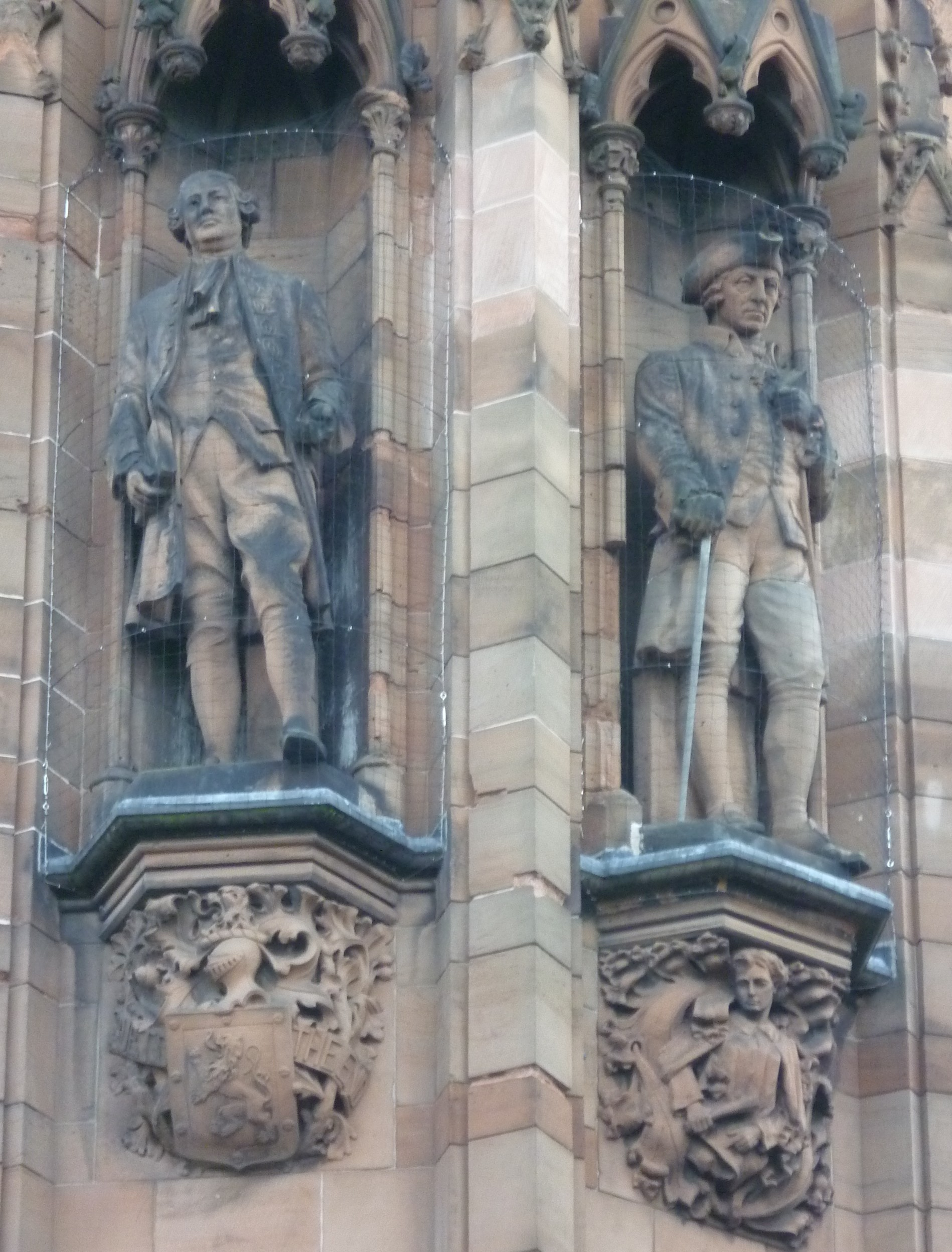
David Hume and Adam Smith on the Scottish National Portrait Gallery

The Scottish Enlightenment (Scots: Scots Enlichtenment, Scottish Gaelic: Soillseachadh na h-Alba) was the period in 18th- and early-19th-century Scotland characterised by an outpouring of intellectual and scientific accomplishments. By the eighteenth century, Scotland had a network of parish schools in the Scottish Lowlands and five universities. The Enlightenment culture was based on close readings of new books, and intense discussions which took place daily at such intellectual gathering places in Edinburgh as The Select Society and, later, The Poker Club, as well as within Scotland's ancient universities (St Andrews, Glasgow, Edinburgh, King's College, and Marischal College).

Sharing the humanist and rational outlook of the Western Enlightenment of the same time period, the thinkers of the Scottish Enlightenment asserted the importance of human reason combined with a rejection of any authority that could not be justified by reason. In Scotland, the Enlightenment was characterised by a thoroughgoing empiricism and practicality where the chief values were improvement, virtue, and practical benefit for the individual and society as a whole.

Among the fields that rapidly advanced were philosophy, political economy, engineering, architecture, medicine, geology, archaeology, botany and zoology, law, agriculture, chemistry and sociology. Among the Scottish thinkers and scientists of the period were Joseph Black, James Boswell, Robert Burns, William Cullen, Adam Ferguson, David Hume, Francis Hutcheson, James Hutton, Lord Monboddo, John Playfair, Thomas Reid, Adam Smith, and Dugald Stewart.

The Scottish Enlightenment had effects far beyond Scotland, not only because of the esteem in which Scottish achievements were held outside Scotland, but also because its ideas and attitudes were carried all over Great Britain and across the Western world as part of the Scottish diaspora, and by foreign students who studied in Scotland.

== Background ==
The union with the Kingdom of England in 1707, which formed the Kingdom of Great Britain, meant the end of the Scottish Parliament. The parliamentarians, politicians, aristocrats, and placemen moved to London. Scottish law remained entirely separate from English law, so the civil law courts, lawyers and jurists remained in Edinburgh. The headquarters and leadership of the Church of Scotland also remained, as did the universities and the medical establishment. The lawyers and the divines, together with the professors, intellectuals, medical men, scientists and architects formed a new middle class elite that dominated urban Scotland and facilitated the Scottish Enlightenment.

=== Economic growth ===
At the union of 1707, the Kingdom of England had about five times the population of Scotland and about 36 times as much wealth, but there were five Scottish universities (St. Andrews, Glasgow, Edinburgh, and Aberdeen's King's College and Marischal College) against two in the Kingdom of England. Scotland experienced the beginnings of economic expansion that allowed it to close this gap. Contacts with the Kingdom of England led to a conscious attempt to improve agriculture among the gentry and nobility. Although some estate holders improved the quality of life of their displaced workers, enclosures led to unemployment and forced migrations to the burghs or abroad. The major change in international trade was the rapid expansion of the Americas as a market. Glasgow particularly benefited from this new trade; initially supplying the colonies with manufactured goods, it emerged as the focus of the tobacco trade, re-exporting particularly to France. The merchants dealing in this lucrative business became the wealthy tobacco lords, who dominated the city for most of the eighteenth century. Banking also developed in this period. The Bank of Scotland, founded in 1695 was suspected of Jacobite sympathies, and so a rival Royal Bank of Scotland was founded in 1727. Local banks began to be established in burghs like Glasgow and Ayr. These made capital available for business, and the improvement of roads and trade.

=== Education system ===
The humanist-inspired emphasis on education in Scotland culminated in the passing of the Education Act 1496, which decreed that all sons of barons and freeholders of substance should attend grammar schools. The aims of a network of parish schools were taken up as part of the Protestant programme in the 16th century and a series of acts of the Privy Council and Parliament in 1616, 1633, 1646 and 1696 attempted to support its development and finance. By the late 17th century there was a largely complete network of parish schools in the Lowlands, but in the Highlands basic education was still lacking in many areas. One of the effects of this extensive network of schools was the growth of the "democratic myth", which in the 19th century created the widespread belief that many a "lad of pairts" had been able to rise up through the system to take high office, and that literacy was much more widespread in Scotland than in neighbouring states, particularly England. Historians are now divided over whether the ability of boys who pursued this route to social advancement was any different than that in other comparable nations, because the education in some parish schools was basic and short, and attendance was not compulsory. Regardless of what the literacy rate actually was, it is clear that many Scottish students learned a useful form of visual literacy that allowed them to organise and remember information in a superior fashion.

By the 17th century, Scotland had five universities, compared with England's two. After the disruption of the civil wars (Wars of the Three Kingdoms), Commonwealth and purges at the Restoration, they recovered with a lecture-based curriculum that was able to embrace economics and science, offering a high quality liberal education to the sons of the nobility and gentry. All saw the establishment or re-establishment of chairs of mathematics. Observatories were built at St. Andrews and at King's and Marischal colleges in Aberdeen. Robert Sibbald (1641–1722) was appointed as the first Professor of Medicine at Edinburgh, and he co-founded the Royal College of Physicians of Edinburgh in 1681. These developments helped the universities to become major centres of medical education and would put Scotland at the forefront of new thinking. By the end of the century, the University of Edinburgh's Medical School was arguably one of the leading centres of science in Europe, boasting such names as the anatomist Alexander Monro (secundus), the chemists William Cullen and Joseph Black, and the natural historian John Walker. By the 18th century, access to Scottish universities was probably more open than in contemporary England, Germany or France. Attendance was less expensive and the student body more socially representative. In the eighteenth century Scotland reaped the intellectual benefits of this system.

=== Intellectual climate ===
In France, the Enlightenment was based in the salons and culminated in the great Encyclopédie (1751–1772) edited by Denis Diderot and (until 1759) Jean le Rond d'Alembert (1713–1784) with contributions by hundreds of leading intellectuals such as Voltaire (1694–1778), Rousseau (1712–1778) and Montesquieu (1689–1755). Some 25,000 copies of the 35-volume set were sold, half of them outside France. In Scottish intellectual life the culture was oriented towards books. In 1763 Edinburgh had six printing houses and three paper mills; by 1783 there were 16 printing houses and 12 paper mills.

Intellectual life revolved around a series of clubs, beginning in Edinburgh in the 1710s. One of the first was the Easy Club, co-founded In Edinburgh by the Jacobite printer Thomas Ruddiman. Clubs did not reach Glasgow until the 1740s. One of the first and most important in the city was the Political Economy Club, aimed at creating links between academics and merchants, of which noted economist Adam Smith was a prominent early member. Other clubs in Edinburgh included The Select Society, formed by the younger Allan Ramsay, a prominent artist, and philosophers David Hume and Adam Smith and, later, The Poker Club, formed in 1762 and named by Adam Ferguson for the aim to "poke up" opinion on the militia issue.

Historian Jonathan Israel argues that by 1750 Scotland's major cities had created an intellectual infrastructure of mutually supporting institutions, such as universities, reading societies, libraries, periodicals, museums and masonic lodges. The Scottish network was "predominantly liberal Calvinist, Newtonian, and 'design' oriented in character which played a major role in the further development of the transatlantic Enlightenment". Bruce Lenman says their "central achievement was a new capacity to recognize and interpret social patterns."

The Scottish Enlightenment owed much to the highly literate culture of Scottish Presbyterianism. Established as the Church of Scotland following the Revolution of 1688, the Presbyterians supported the 1707 Act of Union, and the Protestant Hanoverian monarchy. The eighteenth century saw divisions and dispute between hard-line traditional Calvinists, Enlightenment influenced Moderates, and increasingly popular Evangelicals. Moderate clergy, with their emphasis on reason, toleration, morality and polite manners, were ascendant in the universities. Some of the leading intellectual lights of the Scottish Enlightenment were Presbyterian ministers, such as William Robertson (1721–93), historian and principal of the University of Edinburgh. The careers of sceptics, such as Adam Smith and David Hume, owed much to the tolerance, support and friendship of Moderate clergy.

Such was the reputation of the Scottish clergy for their Enlightenment values that a friend in England asked the Rev. James Wodrow, a minister in Ayrshire, whether two thirds of the Scottish clergy were in reality Deists. Wodrow dismissed the suggestion, and observed that "I cannot imagine the number of Deists among us bear almost any proportion at all to the rest. A few about Edinburgh in east Lothian & in the Merse by reading David Hume's books & by their conversation & connexions with him & his friends, to whom you may add a scatered Clergyman or two here & there in other parts of [the] Country who has happened to get his education among that set of people; are all you can reckon upon & it is no way difficult to account for their forsaking the faith … & loving a present World & the mode of thinking fashionable in it." (James Wodrow to Samuel Kenrick, 25 January 1769).

== Major intellectual areas ==
=== Empiricism and inductive reasoning ===
The first major philosopher of the Scottish Enlightenment was Francis Hutcheson (1694–1746), who was professor of moral philosophy at Glasgow from 1729 to 1746. He was an important link between the ideas of Shaftesbury and the later school of Scottish Common Sense Realism, developing Utilitarianism and Consequentialist thinking. Also influenced by Shaftesbury was George Turnbull (1698–1748), who was regent at Marischal College, Aberdeen, and who published pioneering work in the fields of Christian ethics, art and education.

David Hume (1711–76) whose Treatise on Human Nature (1738) and Essays, Moral and Political (1741) helped outline the parameters of philosophical Empiricism and Scepticism. He would be a major influence on later Enlightenment figures including Adam Smith, Immanuel Kant and Jeremy Bentham. Hume's argument that there were no efficient causes hidden in nature was supported and developed by Thomas Brown (1778–1820), who was Dugald Stewart's (1753–1828) successor at Edinburgh and who would be a major influence on later philosophers including John Stuart Mill.

In contrast to Hume, Thomas Reid (1710–96), a student of Turnbull's, along with minister George Campbell (1719–96) and writer and moralist James Beattie (1735–1803), formulated Common Sense Realism. Reid set out his theories in An Inquiry into the Human Mind on the Principles of Common Sense (1764). This approach argued that there are certain concepts, such as human existence, the existence of solid objects and some basic moral "first principles", that are intrinsic to the make up of man and from which all subsequent arguments and systems of morality must be derived. It can be seen as an attempt to reconcile the new scientific developments of the Enlightenment with religious belief.

=== Literature ===
Major literary figures originating in Scotland in this period included James Boswell (1740–95), whose An Account of Corsica (1768) and The Journal of a Tour to the Hebrides (1785) drew on his extensive travels and whose Life of Samuel Johnson (1791) is a major source on one of the English Enlightenment's major men of letters and his circle. Allan Ramsay (1686–1758) laid the foundations of a reawakening of interest in older Scottish literature, as well as leading the trend for pastoral poetry, helping to develop the Habbie stanza as a poetic form. The lawyer Henry Home, Lord Kames (1696–1782) made a major contribution to the study of literature with Elements of Criticism (1762), which became the standard textbook on rhetoric and style.

Hugh Blair (1718–1800) was a minister of the Church of Scotland and held the Chair of Rhetoric and Belles Lettres at the University of Edinburgh. He produced an edition of the works of Shakespeare and is best known for Sermons (1777–1801), a five-volume endorsement of practical Christian morality, and Lectures on Rhetoric and Belles Lettres (1783). The former fused the oratorical arts of humanism with a sophisticated theory on the relationship between cognition and the origins of language. It influenced many leading thinkers of the Scottish Enlightenment, including Adam Smith and Dugald Stewart.

Blair was one of the figures who first drew attention to the Ossian cycle of James Macpherson to public attention. Macpherson (1736–96) was the first Scottish poet to gain an international reputation. Claiming to have found poetry written by the ancient bard Ossian, he published "translations" that were proclaimed as a Celtic equivalent of the Classical epics. Fingal, written in 1762, was speedily translated into many European languages, and its appreciation of natural beauty and treatment of the ancient legend has been credited more than any single work with bringing about the Romantic movement in European, and especially in German literature, through its influence on Johann Gottfried von Herder and Johann Wolfgang von Goethe. Eventually it became clear that the poems were not direct translations from the Gaelic, but flowery adaptations made to suit the aesthetic expectations of his audience.

Before Robert Burns (1759–96) the most important Scottish language poet was Robert Fergusson (1750–74), who also worked in English. His work often celebrated his native Edinburgh and Enlightenment conviviality, as in his best known poem "Auld Reekie" (1773). Burns, an Ayrshire poet and lyricist, is now widely regarded as the national poet of Scotland and became a major figure in the Romantic movement. As well as making original compositions, Burns also collected folk songs from across Scotland, often revising or adapting them. Burns's poetry drew upon a substantial familiarity with and knowledge of Classical, Biblical, and English literature, as well as the Scottish Makar tradition.

=== Economics ===
Adam Smith developed and published The Wealth of Nations, the starting point of modern economics. This study, which had an immediate impact on British economic policy, still frames discussions on globalisation and tariffs. The book identified land, labour, and stock as the three factors of production and the major contributors to a nation's wealth, as distinct from the Physiocratic idea that only agriculture was productive. Smith discussed potential benefits of specialisation by division of labour, including increased labour productivity and gains from trade, whether between town and country or across countries. His "theorem" that "the division of labor is limited by the extent of the market" has been described as the "core of a theory of the functions of firm and industry" and a "fundamental principle of economic organization." In an argument that includes "one of the most famous passages in all economics," Smith represents every individual as trying to employ any capital they might command for their own advantage, not that of the society, and for the sake of profit, which is necessary at some level for employing capital in domestic industry, and positively related to the value of produce. Economists have linked Smith's invisible-hand concept to his concern for the common man and woman through economic growth and development, enabling higher levels of consumption, which Smith describes as "the sole end and purpose of all production."

=== Sociology and anthropology ===
Scottish Enlightenment thinkers developed what leading thinkers such as James Burnett, Lord Monboddo (1714–99) and Lord Kames called a science of man, which was expressed historically in the work of thinkers such as James Burnett, Adam Ferguson, John Millar, William Robertson and John Walker, all of whom merged a scientific study of how humans behave in ancient and primitive cultures, with an awareness of the determining forces of modernity. Modern notions of visual anthropology permeated the lectures of leading Scottish academics like Hugh Blair, and Alan Swingewood argues that modern sociology largely originated in Scotland. James Burnett is most famous today as a founder of modern comparative historical linguistics. He was the first major figure to argue that mankind had evolved language skills in response to his changing environment and social structures. He was one of a number of scholars involved in the development of early concepts of evolution and has been credited with anticipating in principle the idea of natural selection that was developed into a scientific theory by Charles Darwin and Alfred Russel Wallace.

=== Mathematics, science and medicine ===
One of the central pillars of the Scottish Enlightenment was scientific and medical knowledge. Many of the key thinkers were trained as physicians or had studied science and medicine at university or on their own at some point in their career. Likewise, there was a notable presence of university medically trained professionals, especially physicians, apothecaries, surgeons and even ministers, who lived in provincial settings. Unlike England or other European countries like France or Austria, the intelligentsia of Scotland were not beholden to powerful aristocratic patrons and this led them to see science through the eyes of utility, improvement and reform.

Colin Maclaurin (1698–1746) was appointed as chair of mathematics by the age of 19 at Marischal College, and was the leading British mathematician of his era. Mathematician and physicist Sir John Leslie (1766–1832) is chiefly noted for his experiments with heat and was the first person to artificially create ice.

Other major figures in science included William Cullen (1710–90), physician and chemist, James Anderson (1739–1808), agronomist. Joseph Black (1728–99), physicist and chemist, discovered carbon dioxide (fixed air) and latent heat, and developed what many consider to be the first chemical formulae.

James Hutton (1726–97) was the first modern geologist, with his Theory of the Earth (1795) challenging existing ideas about the age of the Earth. His ideas were popularised by the scientist and mathematician John Playfair (1748–1819). Prior to James Hutton, Rev. David Ure then minister to East Kilbride Parish was the first to represent the shells 'entrochi' in illustrations and make accounts of the geology of southern Scotland. The findings of David Ure were influential enough to inspire the Scottish endeavour to the recording and interpretation of natural history and Fossils, a major part of the Scottish Enlightenment.

Edinburgh became a major centre of medical teaching and research.

== Significance ==
Representative of the far-reaching impact of the Scottish Enlightenment was the new Encyclopædia Britannica, which was designed in Edinburgh by Colin Macfarquhar, Andrew Bell and others. It was first published in three volumes between 1768 and 1771, with 2,659 pages and 160 engravings, and quickly became a standard reference work in the English-speaking world. The fourth edition (1810) ran to 16,000 pages in 20 volumes. The Encyclopaedia continued to be published in Edinburgh until 1898, when it was sold to an American publisher.

=== Cultural influence ===
The Scottish Enlightenment had numerous dimensions, influencing the culture of the nation in several areas including architecture, art and music.

Scotland produced some of the most significant architects of the period who were involved in the intellectual culture of the Enlightenment. Robert Adam (1728–92) was an interior designer as well as an architect, with his brothers developing the Adam style. He influenced the development of architecture in Britain, Western Europe, North America and in Russia. Adam's main rival was William Chambers, another Scot, but born in Sweden. Chambers was appointed architectural tutor to the Prince of Wales, later George III, and in 1766, with Robert Adam, as Architect to the King.

Artists included John Alexander and his younger contemporary William Mossman (1700–71). They painted many of the figures of early-Enlightenment Edinburgh. The leading Scottish artist of the late eighteenth century, Allan Ramsay, studied in Sweden, London and Italy before basing himself in Edinburgh, where he established himself as a leading portrait painter to the Scottish nobility and he undertook portraits of many of the major figures of the Scottish Enlightenment, including his friend the philosopher David Hume and the visiting Jean-Jacques Rousseau. Gavin Hamilton (1723–98) spent almost his entire career in Italy and emerged as a pioneering neo-classical painter of historical and mythical themes, including his depictions of scenes from Homer's Iliad, as well as acting as an informal tutor to British artists and as an early archaeologist and antiquarian. Many of his works can be seen as Enlightenment speculations about the origins of society and politics, including the Death of Lucretia (1768), an event thought to be critical to the birth of the Roman Republic. His classicism would be a major influence on French artist Jacques-Louis David (1748–1825).

The growth of a musical culture in the capital was marked by the incorporation of the Musical Society of Edinburgh in 1728. Scottish composers known to be active in this period include: Alexander Munro (fl. c. 1732), James Foulis (1710–73) and Charles McLean (fl. c. 1737). Thomas Erskine, 6th Earl of Kellie (1732–81) was one of the most important British composers of his era, and the first Scot known to have produced a symphony. In the mid-eighteenth century, a group of Scottish composers began to respond to Allan Ramsey's call to "own and refine" their own musical tradition, creating what James Johnson has characterised as the "Scots drawing room style", taking primarily Lowland Scottish tunes and adding simple figured basslines and other features from Italian music that made them acceptable to a middle-class audience. It gained momentum when major Scottish composers like James Oswald (1710–69) and William McGibbon (1690–1756) became involved around 1740. Oswald's Curious Collection of Scottish Songs (1740) was one of the first to include Gaelic tunes alongside Lowland ones, setting a fashion common by the middle of the century and helping to create a unified Scottish musical identity. However, with changing fashions there was a decline in the publication of collections of specifically Scottish collections of tunes, in favour of their incorporation into British collections.

=== Wider impact ===
While the Scottish Enlightenment is traditionally considered to have concluded toward the end of the 18th century, disproportionately large Scottish contributions to British science and letters continued for another 50 years or more, thanks to such figures as Thomas Carlyle, James Watt, William Murdoch, James Clerk Maxwell, Lord Kelvin and Sir Walter Scott. The influence of the movement spread beyond Scotland across the British Empire, and onto the Continent. The political ideas had an important impact on the Founding Fathers of the United States, which broke away from the empire in 1775. The philosophy of Common Sense Realism was especially influential in 19th century American thought and religion.

In traditional historiography, the Scottish Enlightenment was long identified with abolitionism due to the writings of some of its members and the rarity of enslaved people in Scotland. However, academic John Stewart argues that due to the fact that many members of the Scottish Enlightenment were involved in supporting slavery and scientific racism (a consequence, he argues, of Scotland's disproportionate involvement in the Atlantic slave trade), "the development of eighteenth-century chemistry and the broader intellectual [Scottish] Enlightenment were inextricably entangled with the economic Improvement Movement and the colonial economy of the British slave trade."

=== Cultural representations ===
The Scottish dramatist Robert McLellan (1907–1985) wrote a number of full-length stage comedies which give a self-conscious representation of Edinburgh at the height of the Scottish enlightenment, most notably The Flouers o Edinburgh (1957). These plays include references to many of the figures historically associated with the movement and satirise various social tensions, particularly in the field of spoken language, between traditional society and anglicised Scots who presented themselves as exponents of so-called 'new manners'. Other later examples include Young Auchinleck (1962), a stage portrait of the young James Boswell, and The Hypocrite (1967) which draws attention to conservative religious reaction in the country that threatened to check enlightenment trends. McLellan's picture of these tensions in national terms is complex, even-handed and multi-faceted.

== Key figures ==
- William Adam (1689–1748) architect
- John Adam (1721–1792) architect
- Robert Adam (1728–1792) architect and artist
- James Adam (1732–1794) architect and designer
- Archibald Alison (1757–1839) essayist
- David Allan (1744–1796) painter and illustrator
- James Anderson (1662–1728) lawyer, antiquary and historian
- James Anderson (1739–1808) agriculturalist, political economist and essayist
- John Arbuthnot (1667–1735) physician, satirist and polymath
- John Armstrong (1709–1779) physician, poet and satirist
- Joanna Baillie (1762–1851) poet and dramatist
- George Husband Baird (1761–1840) minister, educational reformer and linguist
- James Beattie (1735–1803) philosopher and poet
- Andrew Bell (1753–1832) priest and educationalist
- Sir Charles Bell (1774–1842) surgeon, physiologist and neurologist
- Henry Bell (1767–1830) engineer
- John Bell of Antermony (1691–1780) doctor and traveller
- Joseph Black (1728–1799) physicist and chemist, first to isolate carbon dioxide
- Thomas Blackwell (1701–1757) classical scholar and historian
- William Blackwood (1776–1834) publisher, founder of Blackwood's Edinburgh Magazine
- Hugh Blair (1718–1800) minister, author
- Sir Gilbert Blane of Blanefield, 1st Baronet (1749–1834) physician
- James Boswell (1740–1795) lawyer, author of Life of Johnson
- John Broadwood (1732–1812) piano manufacturer
- Henry Peter Brougham, 1st Baron Brougham and Vaux (1778–1868) Englishman born, educated and active in Edinburgh, advocate, journalist and statesman
- Robert Brown (1773–1858) botanist
- Thomas Brown (1778–1820) philosopher
- James Bruce of Kinnaird (1730–1794) African explorer
- James Daniel (Yakov) Bruce (1669–1735) Moscow-born Scot, Count of the Russian Empire, statesman, general, diplomat and scientist
- Patrick Brydone (1736–1818) traveller and author
- David Steuart Erskine, 11th Earl of Buchan (1742–1829) founder of the Society of Antiquaries of Scotland
- Robert Burns (1759–1796) poet
- John Stuart, 3rd Earl of Bute (1713–1792) politician, botanist, literary and artistic patron, first President of the Society of Antiquaries of Scotland
- Charles Cameron (1746–1812) architect, active in Russia
- George Campbell (1719–1796) philosopher
- Thomas Campbell (1777–1844) poet
- Alexander Carlyle (1722–1805) church leader and autobiographer
- Thomas Carlyle (1795–1881) historian and philosopher
- Thomas Chalmers (1780–1847) minister and political economist
- Sir William Chambers (1723–1796) architect
- John Cleland (1709–1789) writer, author of Fanny Hill
- Sir John Clerk of Penicuik, 2nd Baronet (1676–1755) politician, lawyer, judge and antiquary
- Sir John Clerk of Eldin (1728–1812) artist, navalist
- John Clerk, Lord Eldin (1757–1832) advocate, judge and collector
- Archibald David Constable (1774–1827) publisher
- William Cruickshank (c 1740-1810/1) chemist
- James Craig (1739–1795) architect, designer of the Edinburgh New Town
- William Cullen (1710–1790) physician, chemist, medical researcher
- David Dale (1739–1806) industrialist, merchant and philanthropist
- Alexander Dalrymple (1737–1808) geographer
- James Dalrymple, 1st Viscount of Stair (1619–1695) lawyer and statesman
- Sir Alexander Dick, 3rd Baronet of Prestonfield (1703–1785) doctor, President of the Royal College of Physicians of Edinburgh
- Sir Robert Douglas of Glenbervie, 6th Baronet (1694–1770) genealogist
- Alexander Dow (1735/6 – 1779) writer and Orientalist
- George Drummond (1688–1766) accountant-general and politician, Lord Provost of Edinburgh
- James Elphinston (1721–1809) educator and linguist
- Robert Erskine (doctor) (1677–1718) doctor and naturalist, head and reformer of Russian medicine, compiled first herbarium in Russia and discovered mineral waters
- Henry Erskine (1746–1817) advocate and politician
- Henry Farquharson (c.1675–1739) mathematician, active in Russia where he introduced Arabic numerals and logarithms
- Adam Ferguson (1723–1816) considered the founder of sociology
- James Ferguson (1710–1776) astronomer and instrument maker
- Robert Fergusson (1750–1774) poet
- Andrew Fletcher of Saltoun (1653–1716) forerunner of the Scottish Enlightenment, writer, patriot, commissioner of Parliament of Scotland
- George Fordyce (1736–1802) physician and chemist
- Andrew Foulis (1712–1775) printer
- Robert Foulis (1707–1776) printer and publisher
- John Galt (1779–1839) novelist
- Alexander Gerard (1728–1795) minister, academic and philosophical writer
- James Gillray (1756–1815) caricaturist and printmaker
- Walter Goodall (1706?–1766) historical writer
- Alexander Gordon of Auchintoul (1669/70–1752) general and memoirist
- Alexander Gordon (1692?–1755) antiquary and singer
- Thomas Gordon (writer) (c.1691–1750) writer and translator from Latin
- Thomas Gordon (1714–1797) philosopher, mathematician and antiquarian
- John Gregory (1724–1773) physician, medical writer and moralist
- John Grieve (1753–1805) physician
- Matthew Guthrie (1743–1807) physician, mineralogist and traveller
- Sir David Dalrymple, Lord Hailes (1726–1792) advocate, judge and historian
- Sir James Hall, 4th Baronet (1761–1832) geologist, geophysicist
- Alexander Hamilton (1739–1802) physician
- Gavin Hamilton (1723–1798) painter and archaeologist
- Sir William Hamilton (1730–1803) diplomat, antiquarian, archaeologist and vulcanologist
- Matthew Hardie (1755–1826) violin maker, called the 'Scottish Stradivari'
- James Hogg (1770–1835) writer, author of The Private Memoirs and Confessions of a Justified Sinner
- Francis Home (1719–1813) physician
- John Home (1722–1808) minister and writer, author of Douglas
- John Hope (1725–1786) physician and botanist
- Francis Horner (1778–1817) politician, lawyer and political economist
- John Hunter (1728–1793) surgeon
- William Hunter (1718–1783) anatomist, physician
- David Hume (1711–1776) philosopher, historian and essayist
- Francis Hutcheson (1694–1746) philosopher
- James Hutton (1726–1797) founder of modern geology
- John Jamieson (1759–1838) minister, philologist and antiquary
- Robert Jameson (1774–1854) Scottish naturalist and mineralogist
- Francis Jeffrey, Lord Jeffrey (1773–1850) advocate, journalist and literary critic, founder of the Edinburgh Review
- Henry Home, Lord Kames (1696–1782) philosopher, judge, historian and agricultural improver
- John Kay (1742–1826) caricaturist and engraver
- James Keir (1735–1820) chemist, geologist, industrialist and inventor
- Thomas Alexander Erskine, 6th Earl of Kellie (1732–1781) composer and virtuoso violinist
- John Law of Lauriston (1671–1729) economist, banker, active in France
- Sir John Leslie (1766–1832) mathematician, physicist
- James Lind (1716–1794) doctor, pioneer of naval hygiene
- James Lind (1736–1812) naturalist and physician
- Charles Lyell (botanist) (1767–1849) botanist and translator of Dante
- John Loudon MacAdam (1756–1836) engineer and road-builder
- Zachary Macaulay (1768–1838) statistician, abolitionist
- Colin Macfarquhar (1745?–1793) printer, co-founder of the Encyclopædia Britannica
- Sir Alexander Mackenzie (1764–1820) explorer of North America
- Henry Mackenzie (1745–1831) lawyer and writer
- Charles Mackie (1688–1770) first Professor of History at Edinburgh University and in the British Isles
- Sir James Mackintosh (1765–1832) jurist, politician and historian
- Charles Macintosh (1766–1843) chemist, inventor of waterproof fabrics
- Colin Maclaurin (1698–1746) mathematician
- James Macpherson (1736–1796) writer, author of Ossian
- David Mallet (Malloch) (c.1705–1765) writer
- Francis Masson (1741–1805) botanist
- William Murray, 1st Earl of Mansfield (1705–1793) jurist, judge and politician
- Henry Dundas, 1st Viscount Melville (1742–1811) advocate and statesman
- Andrew Meikle (1719–1811) engineer and inventor
- Adam Menelaws (1749/56–1831) architect, active in Russia
- James Mill (1773–1836) philosopher
- Andrew Millar (1705–1768) publisher
- John Millar (1735–1801) philosopher, historian
- James Burnett, Lord Monboddo (1714–1799) judge, founder of modern comparative historical linguistics
- Alexander Monro I (1697–1767) physician, founder of Edinburgh Medical School
- Alexander Monro II of Craiglockhart and Cockburn (1733–1817) anatomist, physician
- John Monro of Auchinbowie (1725–1789) advocate
- Jacob More (1740–1793) painter
- James Douglas, 14th Earl of Morton (1702–1768) astronomer, patron of science, President of the Philosophical Society of Edinburgh and of the Royal Society
- James Mounsey (1709/10–1773) physician and naturalist
- Thomas Muir of Huntershill (1765–1799) political reformer
- William Murdoch (1754–1839) engineer and inventor
- Alexander Murray (1775–1813) minister and philologist
- John Murray (1778–1843) publisher
- Carolina Nairne Lady Nairne, née Oliphant (1766–1845) writer and song collector
- William Napier (c.1741–1812) musician and music publisher
- William Nicholson (1782–1849) poet
- Alexander Nisbet (1657–1725) lawyer, antiquarian and heraldist
- William Ogilvie of Pittensear (1736–1819) classicist, numismatist and land reformer
- James Oswald (1710–1769) composer, cellist and music publisher
- Mungo Park (1771–1806) explorer of West Africa
- Thomas Pennant Welsh naturalist, traveller, writer and antiquarian (1726–1798), whose travel writings and collected pictorial representations of Scotland inspired the 'petit' grand tour fueling philosophical and artistic re-interpretation of landscape appreciation in Scotland.
- John Pinkerton (1758–1826) antiquarian, cartographer and historian
- Archibald Pitcairne (1652–1713) physician and bibliophile
- John Playfair (1748–1819) mathematician, geologist
- James Playfair (1755–1794) architect
- William Playfair (1759–1823) engineer, political economist, founder of graphical methods of statistics
- Jane Porter (1776–1850) historical novelist
- Sir Robert Ker Porter (1777–1842) artist, author, diplomat and traveller
- Sir John Pringle, 1st Baronet (1707–1782) physician
- Allan Ramsay (1686–1758) poet
- Allan Ramsay (1713–1784) portrait painter
- Andrew Michael Ramsay (1686–1743) writer, based in France
- Henry Raeburn (1756–1823) portrait painter
- Thomas Reid (1710–1796) philosopher, founder of the Scottish School of Common Sense
- John Rennie (1761–1821) civil engineer
- William Richardson (1743–1814) author and literary scholar
- William Robertson (1721–1793) historian, minister and Principal of the University of Edinburgh
- John Robison (1739–1805) physicist, mathematician and philosopher, first General Secretary of the Royal Society of Edinburgh
- Sir John Ross (1777–1856) Arctic explorer
- William Roxburgh (1751–1815) surgeon and botanist, founding father of Indian botany
- Thomas Ruddiman (1674–1757) classical scholar
- Alexander Runciman (1736–1785) painter
- John Runciman (1744–1768/9) painter
- John Rutherford (1695–1779) physician
- Daniel Rutherford (1749–1819) physician, chemist and botanist
- Paul Sandby (1731–1809) English Topographical and landscape painter, among the first to depict Scotland as a place of landscape appreciation in its natural state, influencing Robert Adam and John Clerk of Eldin.
- Sir Walter Scott (1771–1832) novelist, poet
- Sir Robert Sibbald (1641–1722) physician and antiquary
- Sir John Sinclair of Ulbster (1754–1835) writer, statistician
- George Sinclair (1630–1696), mathematician, engineer, demonologist and professor
- William Skirving (c.1745–1796) political reformer
- William Smellie (1740–1795) editor of the first edition of Encyclopædia Britannica
- Adam Smith (1723–1790) philosopher and political economist
- Sydney Smith (1771–1845) English writer, co-founder of Edinburgh Review
- Tobias Smollett (1721–1771) writer
- Mary Somerville (1780–1872) science writer, astronomer, polymath
- Dugald Stewart (1753–1828) philosopher
- James Stirling (1692–1770) mathematician
- Sir Robert Strange (1721–1792) engraver
- Gilbert Stuart (1742–1786) journalist and historian
- William Symington (1764–1831) engineer, inventor, builder of the first practical steamboat
- Robert Tannahill (1774–1810) poet
- James Tassie (1735–1799) gem engraver and modeller
- Thomas Telford (1757–1834) civil engineer and architect
- James Thomson (1700–1748) poet, author of The Seasons
- George Thomson (1757–1851) collector and publisher of the music of Scotland
- Thomas Trotter (1760–1832) physician
- George Turnbull (1698–1748) theologian, philosopher and writer on education
- William Tytler (1711–1792) lawyer and historian
- Alexander Fraser Tytler, Lord Woodhouselee (1747–1813) advocate, judge, writer and historian
- David Ure (1750–1798) Reverend, Natural History and History, 1st Statistical Account. First to represent entrochi for Scotland and appreciate Scottish natural history in any detail in History of Rutherglen & East Kilbride, 1793.
- Richard Waitt (died 1732) painter
- John Walker (naturalist) (1731–1803) minister and natural historian
- James Watt (1736–1819) inventor of a more efficient, practical steam engine
- James Wilson (1742–1798) a Founding Father of the United States, signer of United States Declaration of Independence
- John Witherspoon (1723–1794) a Founding Father of the United States, signer of US Declaration of Independence

Plus those who visited and corresponded with Scottish scholars:

- Alexander James Dallas (1759–1817) American statesman
- Erasmus Darwin (1731–1802) English physician, botanist, philosopher, grandfather of Charles Darwin
- Semyon Efimovich Desnitsky (c. 1740–1789) native of Ukraine, University of Glasgow graduate, "Father of Russian jurisprudence"
- Benjamin Franklin (1706–1790) polymath, one of the Founding Fathers of the United States
- Princess Yekaterina Romanovna Vorontsova-Dashkova (1743–1810) Director of the Imperial Academy of Sciences in St Petersburg, first President of the Russian Academy

== See also ==
- American Enlightenment
- John Amyatt
- Books in the "Famous Scots Series"
- Industrial Revolution in Scotland
