= Munro of Auchinbowie =

Branch of Clan Munro

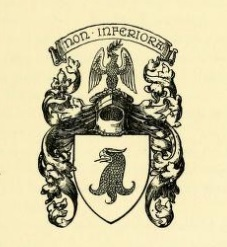
Coat of Arms of the Munro of Auchinbowie family

The Munros of Auchinbowie (sometimes spelt Monro) are a distinguished branch of the Scottish, highland Clan Munro. From this family three Professors of Anatomy at the University of Edinburgh, Scotland were produced, as well as several other doctors and military officers.

== Lineage ==
=== 17th century ===
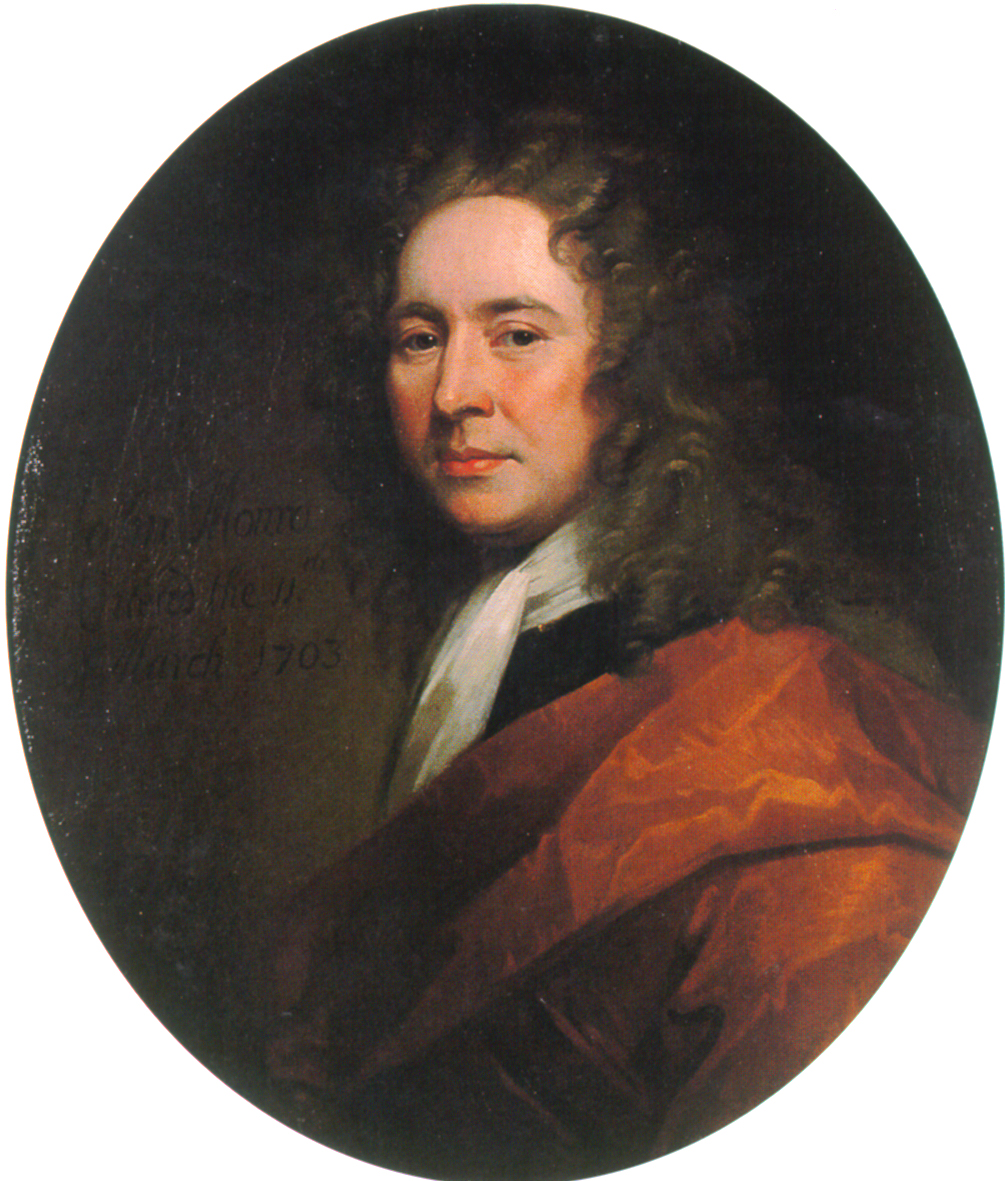
John Monro, Surgeon of the University of Edinburgh whose descendants later succeeded to the Auchinbowie property

The progenitor of the Munros of Auchinbowie is generally regarded as Alexander Munro of Bearcrofts who served as a major in an infantry regiment and saw action at the Battle of Worcester in 1651. He later took up a career of politics. His ancestry can be traced to George Munro, 4th of Milntown who descends from Hugh Munro, 9th Baron of Foulis (d. 1425), an early chief of the Clan Munro of Ross-shire, Scotland.

Alexander Munro of Bearcrofts had seven children:

1. George Munro, 1st of Auchinbowie (1666–1721), famed for his victory over the Jacobites at the Battle of Dunkeld in 1689. He came into ownership of Auchinbowie, a property about four miles south of Stirling through his wife Margaret Bruce of Auchinbowie. Later as a Major in Sir Charles Graham's Regiment of Foot he fought at the Siege of Namur (1695).
2. Archibald Munro (born 1666 - died 1697)
3. John Monro, a surgeon who was the driving force behind the foundation of the University of Edinburgh Medical School and whose descendants would later succeed to the estates of Auchinbowie.
4. Margaret Munro.
5. Lillias Munro.
6. Jean Munro; married William, second son of Sir William Sempil of Cathcart.
7. Mary Munro.

=== 18th century ===
George Munro, 1st of Auchinbowie had three children:

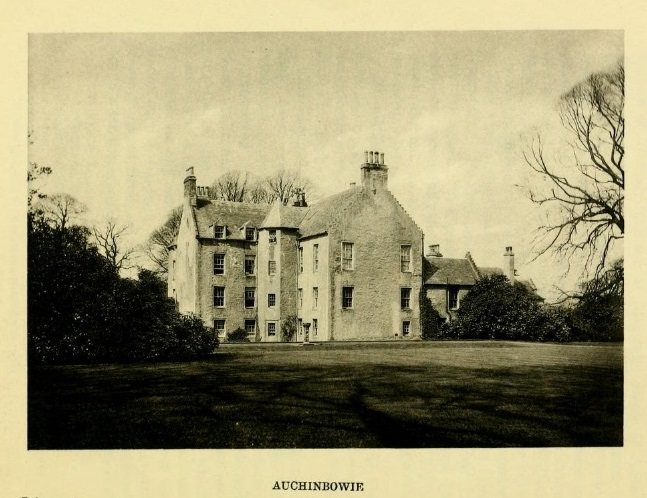
Auchinbowie House, near Stirling, Scotland

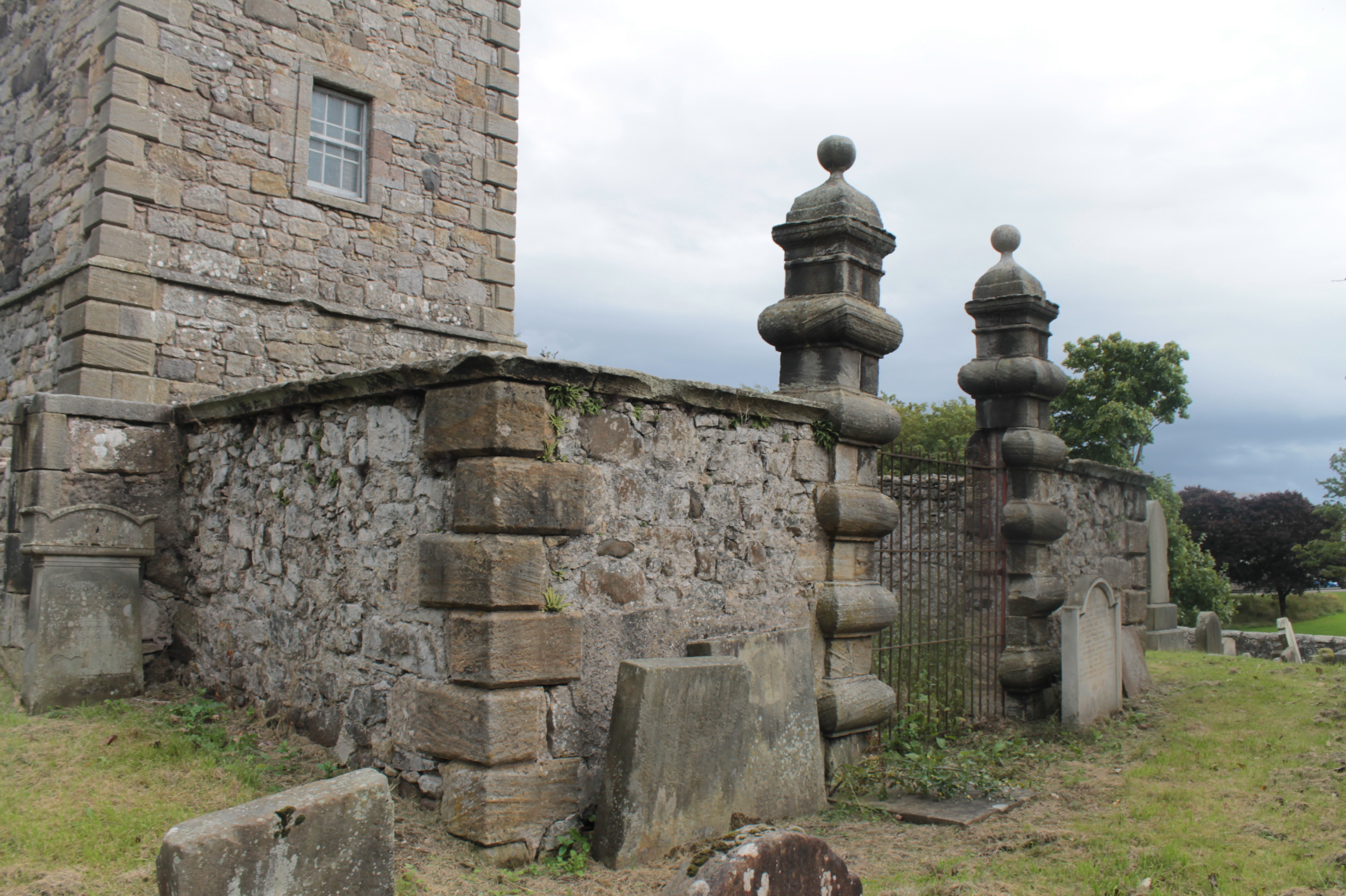
Burial vault of the Monroes of Auchenbowie, St Ninian's Churchyard, Stirling

1. Alexander Munro, 2nd of Auchinbowie who married Anne, daughter of Sir Robert Stewart, Lord Tillicoultry in 1719.
2. George Monro (1700–1757) who was a British Army officer famed for his resolute but ultimately unsuccessful defense of Fort William Henry in 1757 during the Seven Years' War / French and Indian War which was made famous by the novel and later the film The Last of the Mohicans. However, when John Alexander Inglis wrote his history of the Monro of Auchinbowie family in 1911, he had not at that time identified the younger George Monro as a member of the family.
3. Margaret Munro - born 1707.

Alexander Munro, 2nd of Auchinbowie (d. 1742) had nine children:

1. George Munro, 3rd of Auchinbowie (1721–1793) who was an army surgeon who served in the 42nd Highlanders otherwise known as the Black Watch under the chief of the Clan Munro; Colonel Sir Robert Munro, 6th Baronet. In 1750 George was Surgeon in William Maule, 1st Earl Panmure's 25th Regiment of Foot. He saw active service in Germany and afterwards in the war against the French in America. In 1781 he was appointed Physician General to the garrison in Menorca and went through six months siege by the French and Spanish. According to R.W Munro, writing in 1965, George Munro is found in Colonel Johnston's printed roll of army medical staff and as he joined the 25th Foot in 1744 this suggests that he may have been at the Battle of Culloden in 1746.
2. Alexander Munro, a writer in Edinburgh. (1724–1750).
3. John Munro.
4. Cecil Munro. (1719–1786)
5. Five other children - all died young.

George Munro, 3rd of Auchinbowie had two sons:

1. Major George Munro who married Elizabeth Aylmer. They had two sons and one daughter.
2. Lieutenant-General Hector William Munro, 1st of Edmondsham (d. 1821) was Governor of Trinidad and who married Philadelphia Bower of Edmondsham. They had three sons and four daughters.

== Alexander Monro primus ==
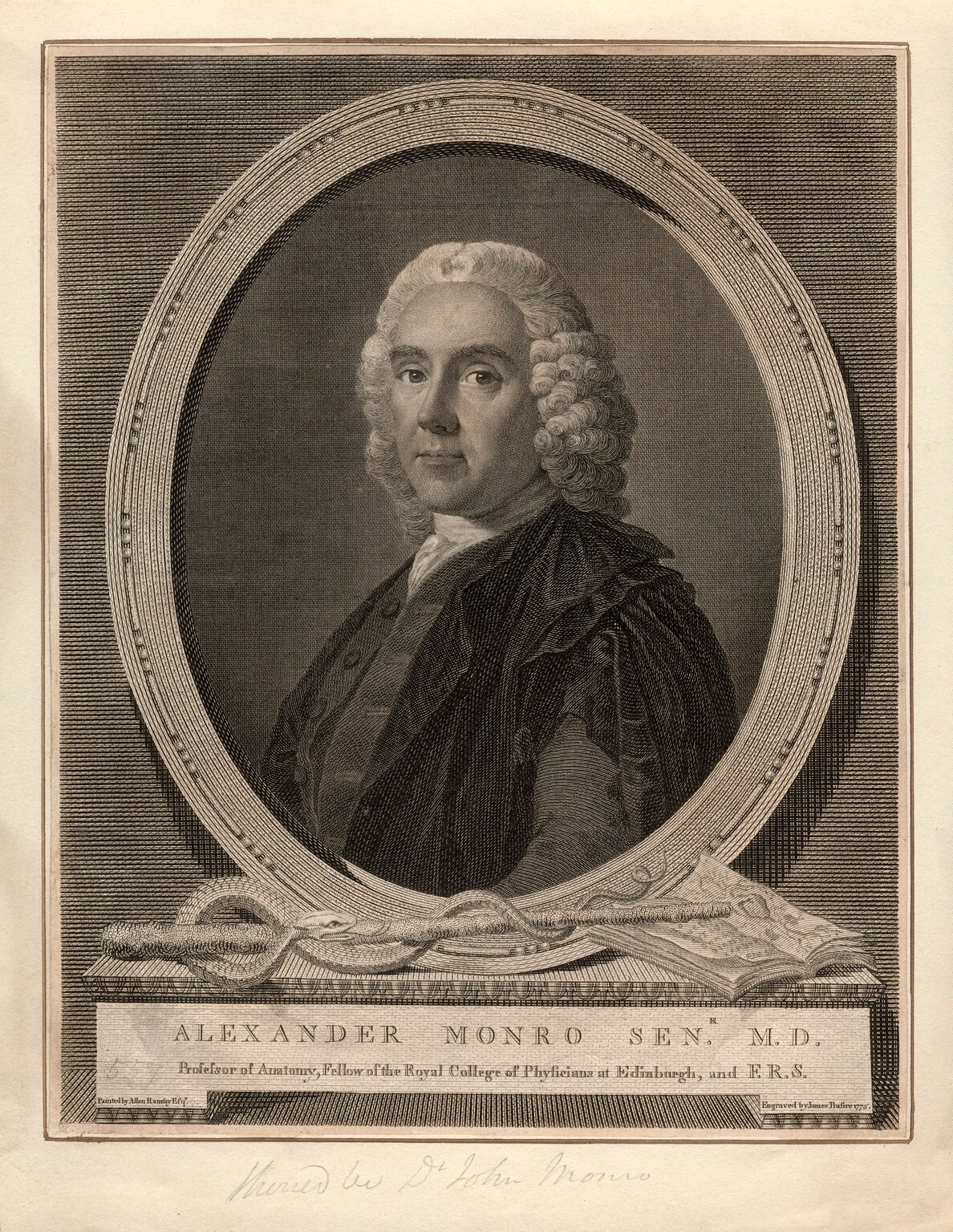
Alexander Monro primus, 4th of Auchinbowie

Although George Munro, 3rd of Auchinbowie had male heirs as mentioned above, he sold the Auchinbowie property to a cousin, Alexander Monro (primus) who was the son of John Monro (surgeon), who was in turn a younger brother of George Munro, 1st of Auchinbowie. Alexander Monro primus was the foundation Professor of Anatomy at the Edinburgh Medical School. He was appointed lecturer on Anatomy by the Incorporation of Surgeons, later the Royal College of Surgeons, at Edinburgh in 1719; the following year he became professor, and in 1725 was appointed the first Professor of Anatomy to the University. He was a principal promoter and early clinical lecturer in the Edinburgh Royal Infirmary. Alexander Monro primus had six children:

1. John Monro, 5th of Auchinbowie, advocate, born 5 November 1725 and married Sophia, eldest daughter of Archibald Inglis of Auchindinny. He died in May 1789.
2. Dr Donald Monro (1728–1802), married Dorothea Maria Heineken.
3. Jean Monro (1729–1731).
4. Mary Monro - born 1730.
5. Alexander Monro (secundus), 1st of Craiglockhart and Cockburn. (1733–1817)
6. Margaret Monro (1757–1802).

Alexander Monro primus treated the wounded on both sides at the Battle of Sheriffmuir in 1715 and at the Battle of Prestonpans in 1745.

== Alexander Monro secundus ==
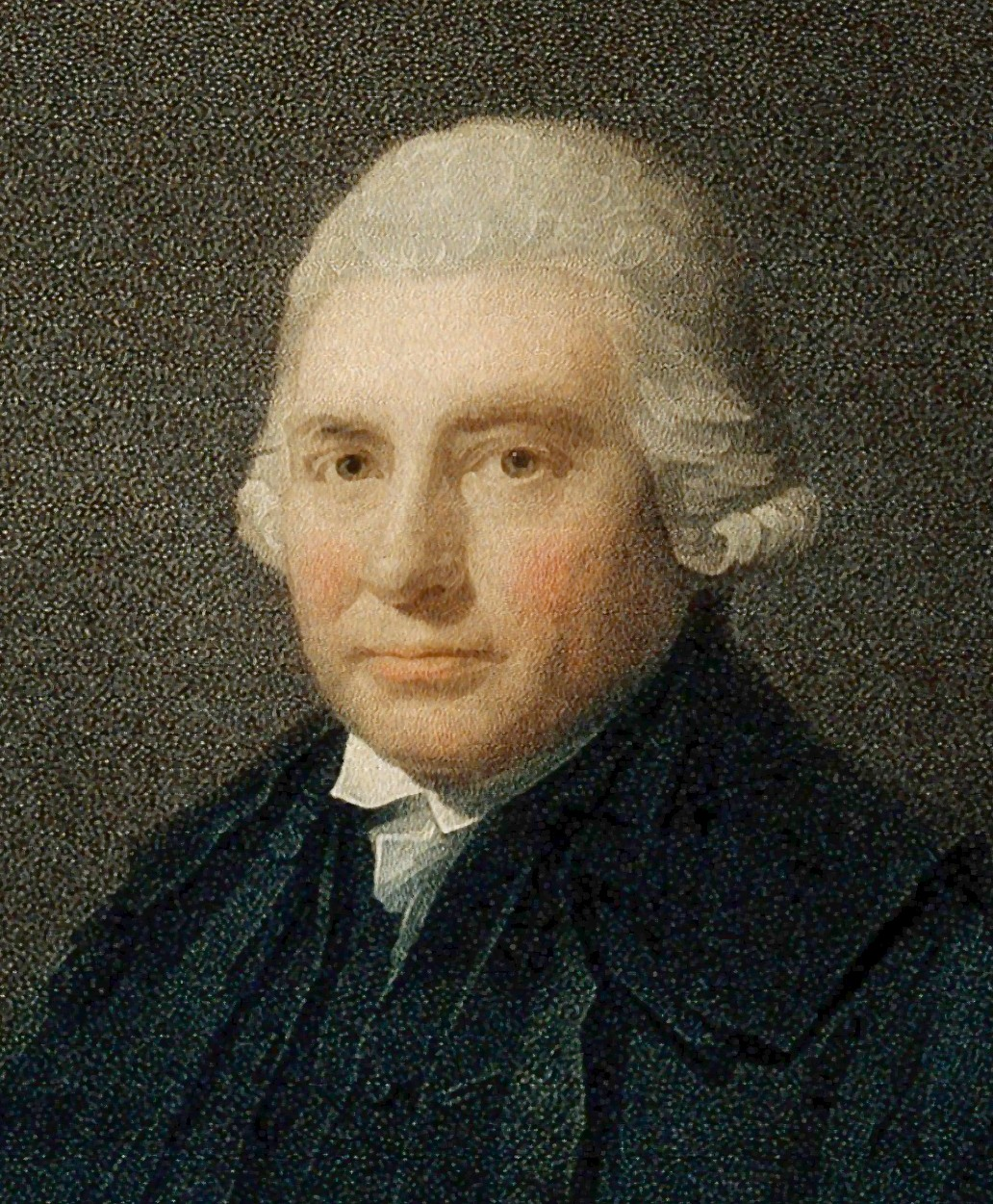
Alexander Monro secundus

Alexander Monro primus was succeeded in the property of Auchibowie by his eldest son John Monro, 5th of Auchinbowie who was in turn succeeded by a daughter. However he was succeeded in his profession by his third son Alexander Monro (secundus) who was Professor of Anatomy in Edinburgh. He took his degree as Doctor of Medicine on 20 October 1775. He then proceeded to studies abroad. He spent a short time in London, where he attended the lectures of Dr William Hunter. He next visited Paris and on 17 September 1757 entered Leiden University where he formed a friendship with two famous anatomists, Bernhard Siegfried Albinus and Petrus Camper. However his foreign studies were principally prosecuted at Berlin, where he worked under the celebrated Professor Meckel, in whose house he lived. Alexander spent some time in Edinburgh during early 1757 in order to fill the place of his father, who was confined to the house by illness. He finally was admitted a licentiate of the Royal College of Physicians of Edinburgh on 2 May 1758 and as a Fellow on 1 May 1759. He had four children:

1. Isabella Monro who married Lieutenant-Colonel Hugh Cott of Gala. She died in 1801.
2. Alexander Monro (tertius), 2nd of Craiglockhart and Cockburn. (1773–1859).
3. David Monro (1776–1843).
4. Charlotte Monro (1782–1822).

== Alexander Monro tertius ==
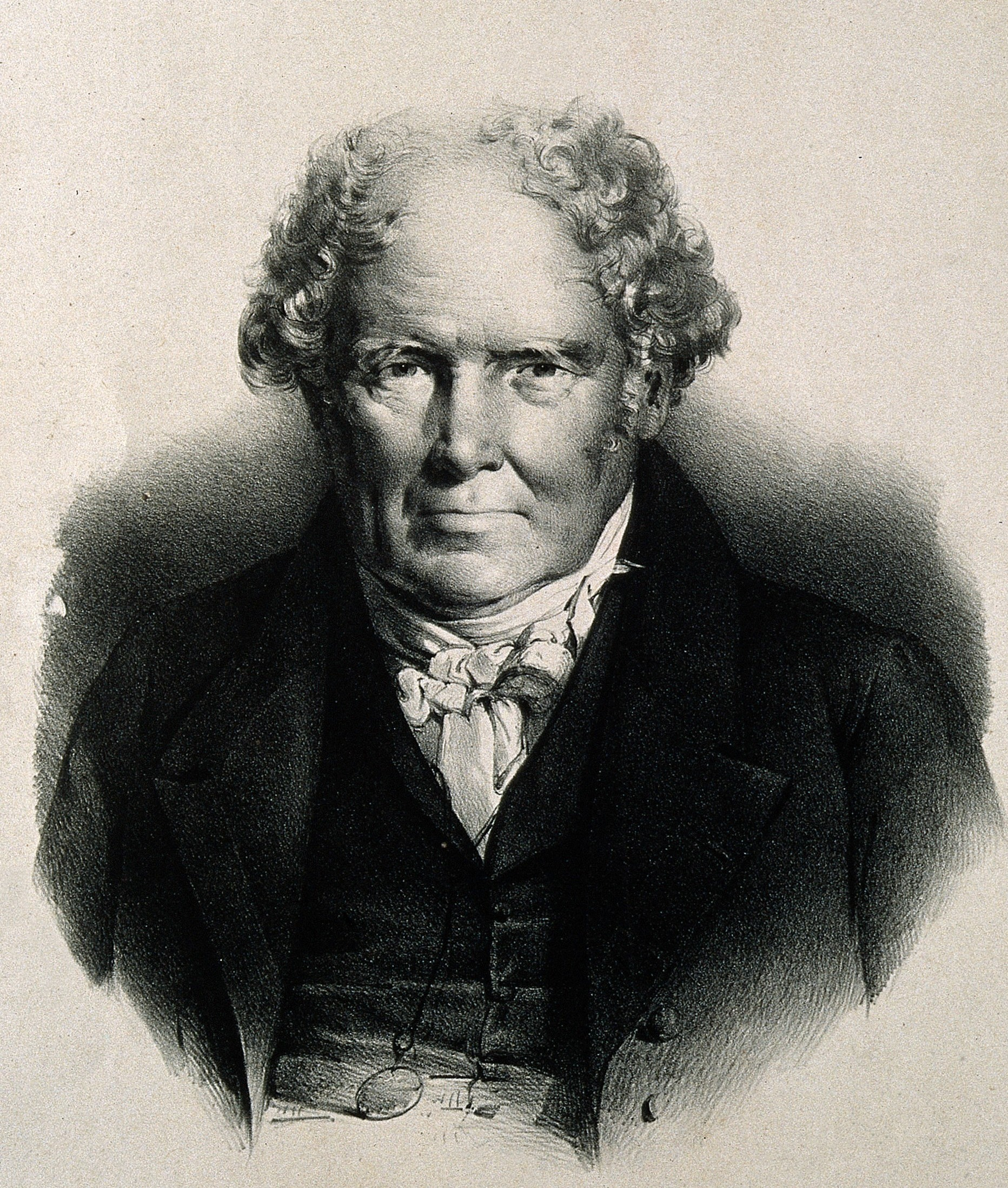
Alexander Monro tertius

Alexander Monro tertius followed his father and grandfather in becoming professor of anatomy at the University of Edinburgh. Amongst his publications are Outlines of the Anatomy of the Human Body (1811) in four volumes and "Elements of Anatomy" (1825) in two volumes. He was Secretary of the Royal College of Physicians from 1809 to 1819 and President in 1827 and 1828. He was also on the Council of the Wernerian Natural History Society of which he became a member in 1811. He had been elected a Fellow of the Royal Society of Edinburgh in 1798 and at his death was father of the Society. He had 12 children:

1. Alexander Monro (1803–1867), was a Captain in the Rifle Brigade (Prince Consort's Own), married Elizabeth, daughter of C. B Scott of Woll.
2. James Monro (1806–1870), was a Surgeon-Major in the Coldstream Guards, married Maria, daughter of Colonel Duffin.
3. Henry Monro (1810–1869), married Jane Christie. One of their sons was Sir Charles Monro, 1st Baronet
4. Sir David Monro (1813–1877), married Dinah, daughter of John Secker. They had five sons including Charles John Monro.
5. William Munro (1815–1881), a Major in the 79th Queen's Own Cameron Highlanders, married Elizabeth, daughter of Sir Robert Abercromby, 5th Baronet.
6. Charles Monro (1818–1820).
7. Maria Monro (1801–1884), married John Inglis of Auchinderry and Redhall.
8. Catherine Monro (1804–1868), married Sir John James Steuart of Allanbank.
9. Georgiana Monro (1808–1868), married George Skene of Rubislaw.
10. Harriet Monro (1816 - 1898), married her cousin Alex Binning Monro who was a descendant of John Monro, 5th of Auchinbowie, their son David Binning Monro was Vice-Chancellor of the University of Oxford.
11. Isabella Monro (1819–1908)
12. Charlotte Monro (1821–1908), married Henry Fletcher.

== DNA ==
DNA testing of two living male members of the Munro of Auchinbowie family has proven their ancestral connection to the Chiefs of Clan Munro.

== See also ==
- Monro of Fyrish
