= George Munro, 1st of Auchinbowie =

- Relatives: George Monro (son)
- Military career
- Allegiance: Kingdom of Scotland
- Branch: Scottish Army
- Rank: Major
- Conflicts: Jacobite rising of 1689: Battle of Dunkeld; Nine Years' War: Siege of Namur

George Munro of Auchinbowie, originally of Bearcrofts was a Scottish born military officer of the late 17th century. He was the first Munro of Auchinbowie.

== Lineage ==
George Munro was the eldest son of Alexander Munro of Bearcrofts who himself was a descendant of the Munro of Milntown family. The Munro of Milntown family descend from a younger son of Hugh Munro, 9th Baron of Foulis (d.1425). In the published genealogies of the family Alexander Mackenzie's designation of "of Bearcrofts" and "of Auchinbowie" is different to that given by John Alexander Inglis. The line that Mackenzie designates of Auchinbowie did not come into possession of the Auchinbowie property until Alexander Monro, who was the son of John Monro, who himself was a younger son of Alexander Munro of Bearcrofts, bought the property from the grandson of the George Munro who is the subject of this article.

== Military career ==
During the Jacobite rising of 1689, George Munro fought for the Scottish Covenanters as a Captain in the Cameronian Regiment at the Battle of Dunkeld where the Jacobites were defeated. The Battle of Dunkeld is said to have lasted four to five hours and the Cameronian regiment of 1200 men was outnumbered by a force of 5000 Jacobites. In the first hour of the battle the Colonel of the Cameronian Regiment, William Cleland, was killed and the Major was wounded so the command fell to Captain George Munro. It is said that they had to use lead stripped off the roofs of houses and melted in the ground for ammunition. The Jacobites were eventually defeated.

After the Battle of Dunkeld, Captain George Munro was promoted to Major and was put in command of an independent company of foot in Perthshire. Later as a Major in Sir Charles Graham's Regiment of Foot he fought at the Siege of Namur in 1695.

== Family ==
George Munro married Margaret Bruce of Auchinbowie in 1693. Margaret was the second daughter of Robert Bruce of Auchinbowie. She had no brothers, and on her father's death the property fell to her elder sister Janet Bruce. However Janet's husband, Captain William Bruce, killed another gentleman in a drunken brawl and he fled from justice, leaving Janet to cope with the debts of the property, which proved too much for her. In 1702 Janet Bruce sold the property to her brother-in-law, Major George Munro, who thus became the Laird of Auchinbowie. They had the following children:

1. Alexander Munro, 2nd of Auchinbowie who according to Inglis married Anne, daughter of Sir Robert Stewart, Lord Tillicultry, but who according Mackenzie, designating this line as of Bearcrofts, died before his own father. However, Mackenzie, page 311, does state We are not at all clear about these marriages, and think there must have been another head of the house which is here missed out. According to Inglis, Alexander of Auchinbowie's son was George Munro (3rd) of Auchinbowie, who sold the property to his cousin Alexander Monro (primus), son of John Monro, son of Alexander Munro of Bearcrofts. It is Alexander Monro (primus) and his father John who Mackenzie designates as the second and first Monros of Auchinbowie.
2. Margaret Munro, who was born in 1707.
3. George Monro, who is believed to have been born in Ireland in about 1700 at Clonfin in county Longford. When John Alexander Inglis wrote his history of the Monro of Auchinbowie family in 1911, he had not at that time identified the younger George Monro as a member of the family. The younger George Monro became famous for his resolute but ultimately unsuccessful defence of Fort William Henry in 1757 during the Seven Years' War/French and Indian War and the subsequent massacre of his garrison at the hands of France's American Indian allies which is portrayed in the novel and various films by the title of The Last of the Mohicans.

== See also ==
- Munro of Auchinbowie
