= Donald Monro (physician) =

Scottish physician and medical author

Dr Donald Monro (1727–1802) was a Scottish physician and medical author.

== Life ==
He was the second son of Alexander Monro (primus). He came from the Munro of Auchinbowie family, who were a branch of the Scottish highland Clan Munro. Donald Monro was born in Edinburgh in 1727.

He was sent along with his brothers to Mr Mundell's school at Edinburgh and then entered the University of Edinburgh to be educated for a medical career. He took his degree as Doctor of Medicine on 8 June 1753 and afterwards settled in London, England. He was admitted a licentiate of the Royal College of Physicians of Edinburgh on 12 April 1756 and on 3 November 1758 was elected a physician to St George's Hospital.

On 3 December 1760, during the Seven Years' War when Britain and Frederick II of Prussia were united against France, Dr Donald Monro received a commission as physician to the hospital for the British forces in Germany, and he remained abroad until March 1763. His work received special encouragement from Duke Ferdinand of Bavaria and General the Marquis of Granby. He retired as physician General to the Army on half-pay of ten shillings a day and settled down to private practice at Jermyn Street, London.

He was admitted a Fellow of the Royal Society on 1 May 1766, and a Fellow of the Royal College of Physicians of Edinburgh on 30 September 1771. He was Censor of the College in 1772, 1781, 1785 and 1789, and was named Elect on 10 July 1788. He delivered the Croonian lectures in 1774 and 1775, and the Harveian oration in 1775. In 1783 he was a joint founder of the Royal Society of Edinburgh.

Dr Donald Monro died at Argyle Street, London on 9 June 1802, aged seventy four years.

== Publications ==
Dr Donald Monro's principal publications were: "Observations on the Means of preserving the Health of Soldiers", 1780 and a treatise in four volumes on "Medical and Pharmaceutical Chemistry and Materia Medica", 1788. He also contributed articles to the Edinburgh "Essays Physical and Literary", and wrote a memoir of his father (Alexander Monro (primus)) for the collected edition of his works published in 1782 by his brother Alexander Monro (secundus).

== Family ==
He was married to Dorothea Maria Heineken.

== Sources ==
- "The Monros of Auchinbowie and Cognate Families". By John Alexander Inglis. Edinburgh. Printed privately by T and A Constable. Printers to His Majesty. 1911.
