= James Mundell =

James Mundell (died 1762) was a Scottish educator. He founded and ran the exclusive Mr Mundell's school in the West Bow of Edinburgh, from 1735 to 1762.

He was uncle of Robert Mundell, rector of Wallace Hall, which adapted the teaching methods of Mundell's Edinburgh school.

== Life ==
Mundell married Agnes Bennet (died 1820), the daughter of a brewer, and their son Robert Mundell (died 1775) became a prominent printer. Agnes Mundell continued her son's business upon his death.

James Mundell became a Burgess of Edinburgh on 16 July 1740. He bought the lands of Over Auldgirth in 1752.

== James Mundell's school ==
Mundell's school taught the humanities, to boys and girls, primarily in Latin. It served the wealthiest residents of Edinburgh, who were concentrated in the Lawnmarket. In competition with the High School, Mr Mundell's school had the advantage of being located closer to the most fashionable quarters. Mundell's school admitted younger children than the High School, typically around the age of six, rather than the High School's eight.

There were only 2 members of staff: James Mundell himself and an usher, initially his younger brother Alexander Mundell.

=== Former pupils of the school ===
According to an official List of scholars educated by the Late Mr. James Mundell, printed in 1789 in Edinburgh by Mundell and Wilson, 568 boys and 94 girls attended the school during its years in operation. The list includes many prominent names:

- William Baillie, Lord Polkemmet
- James Boswell
- William Brodie
- David Erskine, 11th Earl of Buchan
- Ilay Campbell
- George Fergusson, Lord Hermand
- Dr Andrew Hunter
- Alexander Monro
- Donald Monro
- John Monro
- Daniel Rutherford
- Caleb Whitefoord
