= Hector William Munro =

General Hector William Munro (1769–1821) was the British Governor of Trinidad from 27 September 1811 to 14 June 1813.

William Hector was the second son of the surgeon, Dr George Munro of Auchinbowie, one of the distinguished family of Munro of Auchinbowie.

On 30 July 1778, Munro joined the 51st Regiment of Foot as an ensign. He was appointed as a lieutenant on 9 February 1780. He became a captain on 31 March 1788. He exchanged into the 42nd Royal Highlanders, Black Watch, on 8 September 1789.

Having served with distinction in each of the above ranks at Menorca, and subsequently in the campaigns in Flanders, he was on 2 September 1794, promoted to his majority in the 42nd, and on 15 November following was appointed lieutenant-colonel in the Caithness Legion. On 1 January 1801, he was made brevet colonel, and was afterwards appointed brigadier-general on the Staff in Ireland and Great Britain. In March 1804, he received the appointment of Inspecting Field Officer of Volunteers. On 25 April 1808 he became major-general and was subsequently placed on the Staff of the West Indies and in command of Barbados, Surinam, and other places there. In 1811 he was also appointed as Governor of Trinidad. In 1813 just prior to Mariño's force leaving Chacachacare to invade Venezuela, Governor Munro, intent on proving Trinidad's neutrality, sent a detachment of the 1st West India Regiment to the tiny island to investigate claims that a military force was gathering there and to disperse it peacefully, if possible. They returned to report they had discovered nothing, but Munro issued a Proclamation stating that the Government of Trinidad was strictly neutral, and officially banished Mariño from Trinidad (after he had left) and seized the property of all those involved with the affair.

On 4 June 1813, he was made lieutenant general, and in 1816, was appointed Doctor of Letters for Dorset.

He married in 1796, Philadelphia, eldest daughter and co-heiress of Capt. Edmund Bower RN of Edmondsham in Dorset, from whom he acquired that property. They had three sons and four daughters. He died at Bath in Somerset on 3 January 1821 and was succeeded in his estates by his eldest son, Hector William Bower Munro.
