= William Cleland (poet) =

William Cleland (c. 1661 – 21 August 1689) was a Scottish poet and soldier.

Cleland was born in 1661 and was the son of Thomas Cleland, gamekeeper to the Marquess of Douglas, chief of the House of Douglas. He was probably brought up on the Douglas estate, centred at Douglas Castle, Lanarkshire, and was educated at St Andrew's University. Immediately on leaving college he joined the army of the Covenanters, and was present at the Battle of Drumclog, where, says Robert Wodrow, some attributed to Cleland the manoeuvre which led to the victory.

He also fought at the Battle of Bothwell Bridge. He and his brother James were described in a royal proclamation of 16 June 1679, among the leaders of the insurgents. He escaped to Holland, but in 1685 was again in Scotland in connection with the abortive invasion led by Archibald Campbell, 9th Earl of Argyll. He escaped once more, to return in 1688 as agent for William III of England (William of Orange).

He was appointed as the lieutenant-colonel of the new Cameronian regiment raised from the Marquess' tenantry and a minority of the western Covenanters who consented to serve under William II. The Cameronians were entrusted with the defence of Dunkeld, which they held against the fierce assault of the Jacobites on 21 August at the Battle of Dunkeld where William Cleland was killed. He died in the first hour of battle by a bullet in the head, but was able to drag himself out of sight so that his men would not see him fall.

His Major was wounded and the command fell to George Munro. The defeat of the Jacobites at Dunkeld ended the Jacobite rising.

Cleland was buried in Dunkeld cathedral.

== Publications ==
His Collection of several Poems and Verses composed upon various occasions was published posthumously in 1697. Of Hullo, my fancie, whither wilt thou go? only the last nine stanzas are by Cleland. His poems have small literary merit, and are written, not in pure Lowland Scots, but in English. with a large admixture of Scottish words. The longest and most important of them are the mock poems On the Expedition of the Highland Host who came to destroy the western shires in winter 1678 and On the clergie when they met to consult about taking the Test in the year 1681.

== See also ==
- Scottish literature
