= Caleb Whitefoord =

Scottish merchant, diplomat and political satirist

Caleb Whitefoord FRS FRSE
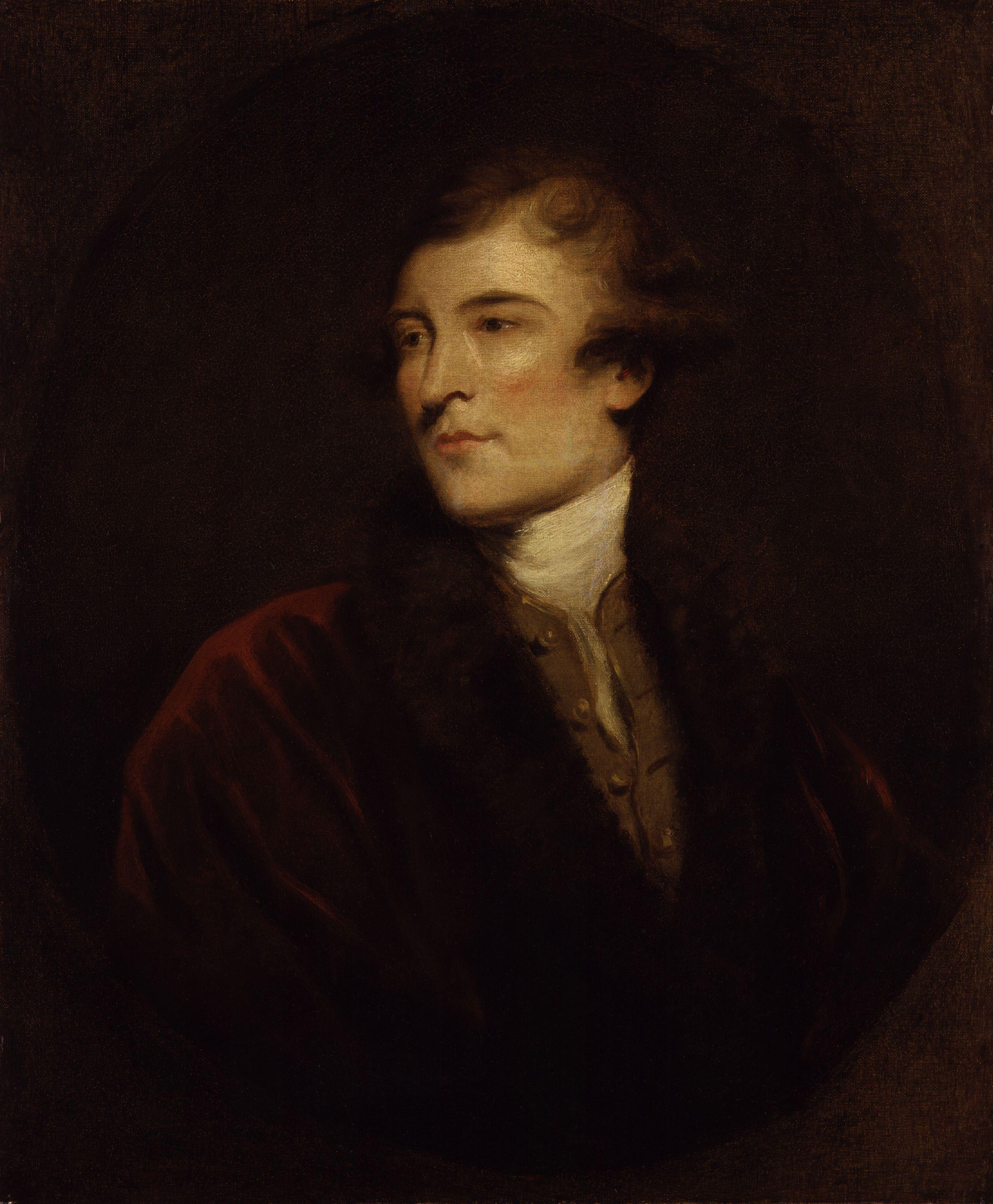
- Caleb Whitefoord, by Sir Joshua Reynolds
- Born: 1734; Edinburgh, Scotland
- Died: 4 February 1810 (aged 75–76); Argyll Street, London, England
- Citizenship: Great Britain
- Education: Edinburgh University
- Notable work: Secretary to the commission which concluded peace between Great Britain and the United States at Paris, 1782
- Spouse: Mary Sidday

Caleb Whitefoord FRS FRSE FRSA (1734 – 4 February 1810) was a Scottish merchant, diplomat, and political satirist.

== Life ==
He was born in Edinburgh in 1734, probably in the family home of Whitefoord House on the Canongate, the illegitimate son of Colonel Charles (James) Whitefoord of the Royal Marines (son of Sir Adam Whitefoord, 1st Baronet), he was educated at James Mundell's School and Edinburgh University.

He moved to London, and in 1756 became a wine merchant.

In 1782, he served as Lord Shelburne's envoy to Benjamin Franklin on the Peace Commission at Paris. On 30 November 1782, during a meeting with Franklin and a French delegate, Whitefoord recorded that the Frenchman "talked of the growing greatness of America; & that the thirteen United States would form the greatest Empire in the World. — Yes sir, I replied & they will all speak English, every one of 'em. His Triumph was check'd, he understood what was intended to be convey'd, viz. that from a similarity of Language Manners and Religion that great Empire would be English not French".

In 1784, he was elected a Fellow of the Royal Society of London, and in 1788, upon the proposal of Robert Arbuthnot, Sir William Forbes and Alexander Fraser Tytler he was elected a Fellow of the Royal Society of Edinburgh. In 1790, Whitefoord was nominated by Benjamin Franklin and elected to membership of the American Philosophical Society. In 1800, he married Mary Sidday, and had issue, amongst whom an eldest son, Rev. Caleb Whitefoord, M.A. (Oxon.), rector of Burford with Whitton, Herefordshire, had five sons. He died at 28 Argyll Street, London, on 25 January 1810, and was interred at St Mary on Paddington Green Churchyard.

== Works ==
- In 1766, Whitefoord published whimsical misreadings of newspaper texts, using the pseudonym Papyrius Cursor (a play on the name of Lucius Papirius Cursor).
- Whitefoord, Caleb (1781). The daily advertiser, in metre. G. Keasly.
- Whitefoord, Caleb (1799). Advice to Editors of Newspapers. BiblioBazaar. ISBN 978-1-140-69119-8.

=== Co-authored ===
- Dobson, Austin; Whitefoord, Caleb (1896). A postscript to Dr. Goldsmith's retaliation: being an epitaph on Samuel Johnson, LL.D.
- Whitefoord, Charles; Whitefoord, Caleb (1898). William Albert Samuel Hewins (ed.). The Whitefoord papers: being the correspondence and other manuscripts of Colonel Charles Whitefoord and Caleb Whiteford, from 1739 to 1810. Clarendon Press. pp. 292. – Charles Whitefoord served in Wynyard's (4th Marines), Gooch's, and the 5th Marines in the 1740s.
