= George Kellie =

Scottish surgeon

Dr George Kellie MD, FRSE (1770–1829) was a Scottish surgeon who, together with Alexander Monro secundus gave his name to the Monro-Kellie doctrine, a concept which relates intracranial pressure to the volume of intracranial contents and is a basic tenet of our understanding of the neuropathology of raised intracranial pressure. The doctrine states that since the skull is incompressible, and the volume inside the skull is fixed then any increase in volume of one of the cranial constituents must be compensated by a decrease in volume of another. Previous research about George Kellie (1720–1779) may have been hampered by a widely cited incorrect year of birth, by the spelling of his name as Kellie or Kelly and by confusion with his father, also a surgeon in Leith, with the same name and subject to similar spelling variations.

== Early life ==
George Kellie was born in Leith, the seaport for Edinburgh which was at that time the fifth largest town in Scotland. His parents George Kellie (1742–1805), originally from Dunbar, East Lothian, and Catherin [sic] McCall of Haddington, East Lothian had married in South Leith in August 1769 On his baptismal entry in the parish of Dunbar, East Lothian for 6 October 1742 George senior's surname is spelt Kellie, as is that of his father. In the South Leith parish records of his marriage to Catherin McCall in August 1764 and the record of the birth of his son, the spelling is given as 'Kelly'. George Kellie senior practised as a surgeon and while there is no record of his registration as a surgical apprentice in Wallis's extensive listing of British medical and surgical apprentices that listing showed that he trained three apprentices between 1771–75. The Street directories for Edinburgh and Leith for the years 1773–1805 show that ‘George Kelly’ senior practised as a surgeon in Tolbooth Wynd, Leith, the only Kelly or Kellie listed in Leith for that period. In 1774 he published a paper describing a case of extensive surgical emphysema which, after consulting with Alexander Monro secundus, he had successfully treated by inserting of a cannula into the thoracic cavity. George Kelly senior died at Leith on 3 April 1805, the spelling of his name on the death notice reverting to 'Kellie'. George Kellie junior followed his father into a career as a surgeon in Leith after serving a five year apprenticeship to the Edinburgh surgeon James Arrott (1760–1818).

== Naval service ==
As Arrott had done before him Kellie joined the Royal Navy in 1790 as a surgeon. During this naval service he published papers in the form of letters to his father ‘Mr Kellie, surgeon, Leith’. A letter to Edinburgh Medical Commentaries dated 21 May 1794 show that he is now surgeon on HMS Iris, a 32 gun, fifth rate frigate. In this letter he records experiments on himself, describing the effects of compressing the arm by tourniquet. In August 1796 he was posted to HMS Leopard, a 50 gun fourth rate warship. In the next month he writes to the Annals of Medicine about the anatomy of the shark and the following year writes with more information about tourniquet compression. In a letter to the Annals in 1801 from a Mr Livingstone, Kellie is described as ‘physician to the English prisoners at Valencienne’, a reference to the town in the Pas de Calais in northern France where British prisoners of war were held during the Napoleonic War.

== Return to Leith ==
When Kellie returned to surgical practice in Leith he maintained his military links by becoming Surgeon to the Royal Leith Volunteers. In 1802 he became a fellow of the Royal College of Surgeons of Edinburgh (RCSEd) and was elected a Burgess of the City of Edinburgh, a necessary prerequisite to practise as a surgeon-apothecary. On 12 September 1803 he graduated MD from the University of Edinburgh Medical School with a thesis entitled ‘de Electricitate animale’, by now obviously able to pay the graduation fee. On 21 November 1805 he married Ann Wight, daughter of Robert Wight of the Murrays near Ormiston in East Lothian, maintaining his family links with that region. He now published a series of papers on a diverse range of medical and surgical topics. In 1805 he was elected a member of the Aesculapian Club. and in 1811 he was elected a member of the Harveian Society of Edinburgh.

== Paper on intracranial circulation ==
In the paper which was to give Kellie lasting eponymous fame he describes the post mortem appearances in the bodies of two individuals found dead after lying outside after a storm. He was asked by local magistrates to try to establish the cause of death. Kellie noted that the veins in the meninges and surface of the brain were congested and the associated arteries were relatively bloodless while the brain was otherwise normal. In concluding that the individuals died from exposure he quotes a similar case described by Samuel Quelmalz (1696–1758) where exposure results in a progression through weariness, lassitude, drowsiness, coma and death which he ascribes to disordered cerebral circulation. He concluded 'When the cavity of the cranium is encroached upon by depression of its walls compensation may be made at the expense of circulatory fluid within the head; less blood is admitted and circulated'. Kellie gave credit to two of his Edinburgh contemporaries for their contributions in the shaping of this concept, Alexander Monro secundus (' ... my illustrious preceptor in anatomy, the second Monro') and John Abercrombie. Monro had stated that since the healthy cranial cavity is rigid and of constant volume and the brain 'is nearly incompressible, the quantity of blood within the head must remain the same'. Later in the paper Kellie described how Monro, aware of his interest, invited him jointly to examine the brains of executed criminals and sent him descriptions of autopsy findings in other similar cases. He gives Abercrombie particular credit when he writes 'the argument has already been taken up and illustrated by Dr Abercrombie, in his ingenious analysis of apoplexy ... '. In 1818 Abercrombie indeed had ‘proposed a doctrine’ clearly setting out the hypothesis. Abercrombie was largely responsible for the doctrine becoming widely known and accepted around the world. His authoritative book Pathological and Practical Researches on Disease of the Brain and Spinal Cord first published in 1828 was a milestone in neuropathology which ran to three British, two American and French and German editions. In it Abercrombie linked the theories of Monro and Kellie and gave them full credit for the hypothesis

== Testing the doctrine ==
As Abercrombie had done before him, Kellie went on to test his theories with a series of animal experiments where he studied the cerebral circulation of sheep and of dogs immediately after exsanguination or death induced by cyanide. He found that in many instances while the tissues outwith the cranium were drained of blood, the brain was not affected in this way, retaining blood volume. He concluded that where the circulating blood volume was depleted, the volume circulating within the cranium remained constant, with the increase in arterial tone and consequent reduction in arterial blood volume being compensated by venous engorgement thus keeping the total blood volume constant. The English physician Dr (later Sir) George Burrows (1801–1887) later tested the hypothesis with CSF included in the equation. He repeated Kellie’s experiments using animal exsanguination and concluded that a depletion of CSF volume was compensated by an increase in intracranial blood volume and vice versa, so validating the hypothesis. Harvey Cushing (1869–1939)and his researcher Lewis Weed (1886–1952) tested the theory in the light of increasing knowledge and Weed found that ' ... in every way Monro-Kellie doctrine must be considered essentially correct'. The development of techniques to measure cerebral blood flow (CBF) and intracranial pressure (ICP) have allowed more sophisticated testing of the doctrine and shown that the hypothesis formulated by Monro, Kellie and Abercrombie still holds good.

== Later life and death ==
Kellie went on to achieve local distinction in his lifetime. He was elected a Fellow of the Royal Society of Edinburgh in December 1823. In 1827 he was elected President of the Edinburgh Medico-Chirurgical Society and was succeeded in that office by John Abercrombie. George Kellie collapsed and died in Leith on 28 September 1829 while on his way home from visiting a patient.
