= The Select Society =

The Select Society, established in 1754 as The St. Giles Society but soon renamed, was an intellectual society in 18th century Edinburgh. The society was first a discussion club then shortly thereafter a debating club for the intellectual elite of Edinburgh.

== History ==
The Select Society initially had fifteen members, who included:

- James Adam
- John Adam
- James Burnett, Lord Monboddo
- George Drummond
- Adam Ferguson
- Francis Home
- Henry Home, Lord Kames
- David Hume
- John Monro
- Alexander Monro primus
- Allan Ramsay
- William Robertson
- Adam Smith

By the end of its first year, The Select Society had eighty three members. Some years later, some of the members established The Poker Club.

Their mission was articulated in The Scots Magazine in 1755: "The intention of these gentlemen was, by practice to improve themselves in reasoning and eloquence, and by the freedom of debate, to discover the most effectual methods of promoting the good of the country."

A member would pose a question for debate during the following meeting. Meetings were held on Wednesday nights from 6 PM to 9 PM 12 November – 12 August.

== Membership ==
To become a member, one needed to be recommended in writing by two current members. If more than one name was up for consideration, members voted and the majority name made it to the following meeting at which a vote of three-fourths was needed to confirm the membership.

== Other Societies ==
In 1755 the Select Society founded a subsidiary body: the Edinburgh Society for Encouraging Arts, Sciences, Manufactures, and Agriculture in Scotland.

The society was not the only one of its kind in Edinburgh, with The Speculative Society performing a similar role.

Members of the society would go on to be involved with Edinburgh's convivial societies, such as The Poker Club.

== See also ==
- Scottish Enlightenment
