= The Poker Club =

Scottish society

The Poker Club was one of several clubs at the heart of the Scottish Enlightenment where associated with that movement met and exchanged views in a convivial atmosphere.

== History ==
The Poker Club was created in 1762 out of the ashes of The Select Society.

The Poker was the name given to the Militia Club at its third or fourth meeting. The Militia was formed in Edinburgh to promote the cause of establishing a militia in Scotland. It was thought that the formation of a democratic national force was essential to grace the dignity of the nation and the aim was to make up for the omission of that provision in the Militia Act 1757 which applied only to England and the Scottish Militia Bill which was rejected in April 1760. The aim of the club provoked some unwelcome opposition and, it was said that at the suggestion of Adam Ferguson the name was changed so as to be enigmatic to the general public. Much as a fireplace poker stirs a fire to flame up, The Poker was to "stir up" the militia question.

David Hume could well find the company of The Poker a relief from a skeptical depression – "Most fortunately it happens that since reason is incapable of dispelling these clouds, nature herself suffices to that purpose ... I dine, I play a game of backgammon, I converse, and am merry with my friends; and when after three or four hours amusement, I return to these speculations, they appear so cold, and strain'd, and ridiculous, that I cannot find it in my heart to enter into them any farther."

As to why the club collapsed, Adam Smith's biographer John Rae wrote, "Divided counsels and diminished zeal supply, no doubt, the main reason for the decay of the Poker Club," but he also mentioned the rising costs to members.

== Membership ==
The club was said by Dr. Carlyle to consist of all the literati of Edinburgh and its surroundings. The establishment was frugal and moderate, "as that for all clubs for a public purpose should be. The dinner was set soon after two o'clock, at one shilling a head, the wine to be confined to sherry and claret, and the reckoning to be called at six o’clock".

The first fifteen members were chosen by nomination, the rest by ballot, "two black balls to exclude the candidate". A new "preses" (chairman) was chosen at each meeting. There were three office bearers: the Secretary, Sir William Pulteney, the Assassin, Andrew Crosbie and the Assassin’s Assessor, David Hume "without whose assent nothing could be done, so that between "plus" and "minus" there was likely to be no bloodshed".

The records are held at University of Edinburgh Library, Heritage Collections, reference Coll-1564 and the minute book of 1776 names forty three members, including Joseph Black, "Jupiter" Carlyle, Sir John Clerk of Eldin, Henry Dundas, Adam Ferguson, Lord Elibank, Sir John Dalrymple, John Home, David Hume, William Robertson, John Robison, George Dempster, and Adam Smith.

== See also ==
- Edinburgh Cape Club
- Crochallan Fencibles
