= John Monro (advocate) =

British lawyer (1725–1789)

John Monro, 5th of Auchinbowie (born 5 November 1725 – 24 May 1789) was a Scottish advocate. He was the eldest son of Alexander Monro Primus of the distinguished Munro of Auchinbowie family.

John received his early education at Mr Mundell's school in Edinburgh and was admitted an advocate on 24 July 1753 at the age of twenty-seven. He had a fair practice and on 21 January 1758 he was appointed Procurator Fiscal or Crown Prosecutor in the High Court of Admiralty on the nomination of the Judge, his brother-in-law James Philp. On several occasions in 1762 during the Judge's absence he filled his place on the bench. From 1760 to 1769, he was one of the group of advocates who reported and published the decisions of the Court of Session. He was also a member of The Select Society.

On 8 July 1757, Monro married Sophia, daughter of the deceased Archibald Inglis of Auchindinny, Midlothian and Langbyres, Lanarkshire, the eldest of three co-heiresses. Monro's father also made over to him the estate of Auchinbowie.

Monro died on 24 May 1789, aged 63, and as he made no will, Auchinbowie was divided between two daughters.
