= Francis Home =

Scottish physician (1719–1813)

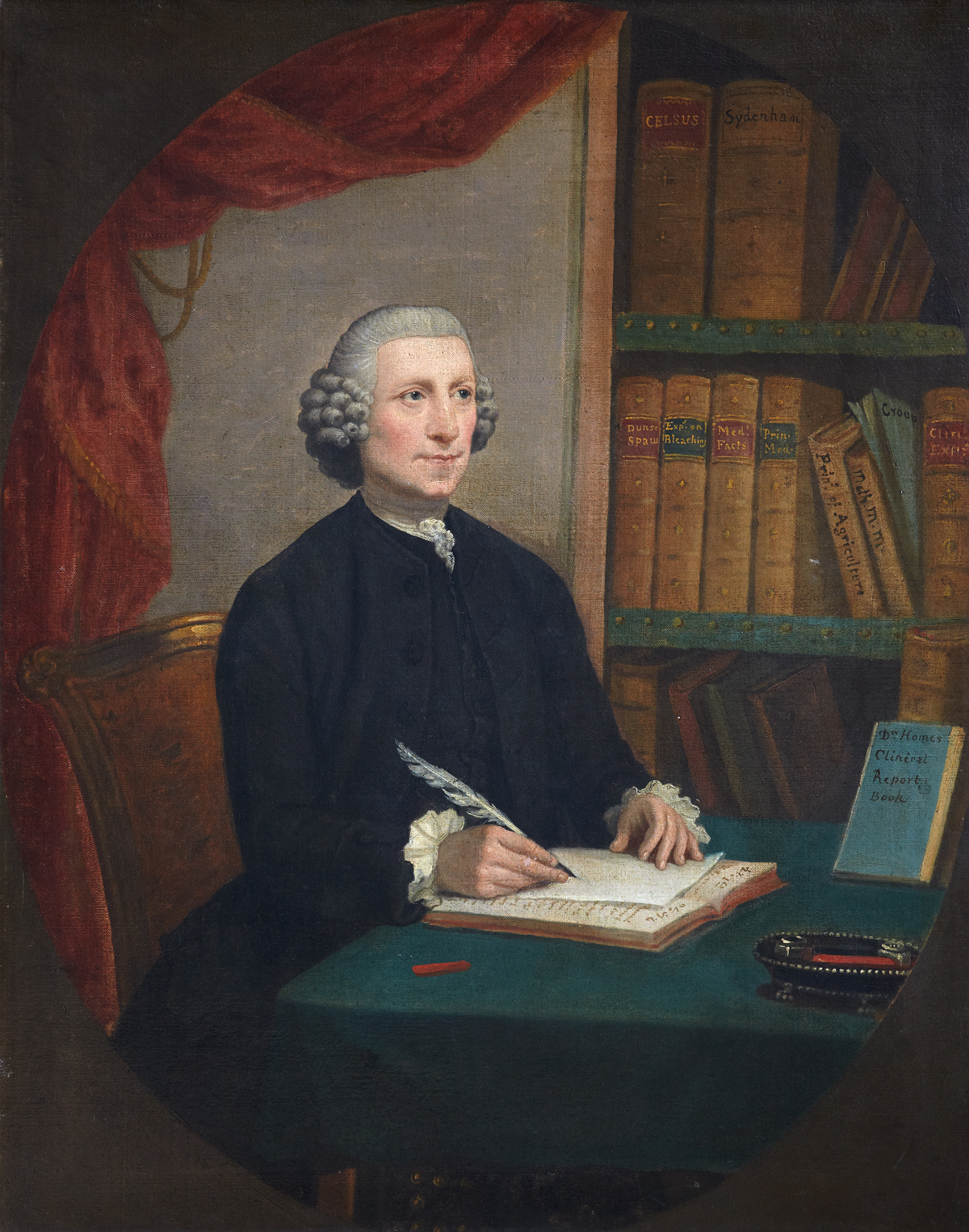
Francis Home by David Allan.

Francis Home FRSE FRCPE (17 November 1719 in Eccles, Berwickshire – 15 February 1813) was a Scottish physician, and the first Professor of Materia Medica at the University of Edinburgh, known to make the first attempt to vaccinate against measles, in 1758. In 1783 he was one of the founders of the Royal Society of Edinburgh.

== Biography ==
Francis Home was the third son of John Home, an advocate residing at Eccles, Berwickshire.

He received his education at Duns Grammar School. He was then apprenticed to Dr Rattray, a surgeon in Edinburgh.

From 1742 to 1748 he served as surgeon of dragoons in Flanders in the Seven Years' War, studying at Leyden University during the intervals of the campaigns. Leaving the army, he graduated with an MD University of Edinburgh in 1750, with a treatise on intermittent fever, and became a fellow of the Edinburgh College of Physicians.

After graduation, Home worked as a physician in Edinburgh, from 1749. After practising medicine for some years at Edinburgh, and obtaining in 1757 a gold medal for an essay on the principles of agriculture, given by the Edinburgh Society for the Improvement of Arts and Manufactures. He was appointed in 1768 the first professor of materia medica in the University of Edinburgh, the subject being then dissociated from botany. He held this post till 1798, and as one of the clinical professors of medicine at the Edinburgh Royal Infirmary experimented on the actions of several novel drugs, which he introduced into practice.

Home served as president of the Royal College of Physicians of Edinburgh (1775-7) and as president of the Physical section of the Royal Society of Edinburgh (1789–96). In 1784 Home was elected a member of the Harveian Society of Edinburgh and served as president in 1794. He was a founding member of both the Royal Medical Society and of the Select Society.

He was the father of James Home FRSE (1760-1844), Professor of Materia Medica at the University of Edinburgh.

== Work ==
Home was an important figure in Edinburgh during the Enlightenment. His 1756 essay "Experiments on Bleaching", which won a gold medal was awarded by the trustees for the improvement of manufactures in North Britain, was translated into French and German. It was also an early presentation of the chemical principles underlying plant nutrition.

As a professor he speculated somewhat rashly, but carefully treated the physical characters and mode of administration of drugs. His 'Principia Medicinæ' was a valuable work in its day, and was used as a text-book by several continental professors.

Home was also the first to call attention to croup as a distinct disease in his tractate on the subject, which Dr. Squire, in Reynolds's 'System of Medicine,' 1866, i. 236, terms a 'careful and most philosophical inquiry,' deciding the dependence of the symptoms on pathological changes in the larynx and trachea.

== Selected publications ==
- Dissertatio de Febre Intermittente, Edinburgh, 1750, 4to; republished in Smellie's Thesaurus Medicus, 1778.
- An Essay on the contents and virtues of Dunse-Spaw, Edinburgh, 1751
- Experiments on Bleaching Edinburgh, 1756,
- The Principles of Agriculture and Vegetation, Edinburgh, 1757; 3rd edition, 1759; French translation, Paris, 1761; German translation, Berlin, 1779.
- Principia Medicinæ, Edinburgh, 1758; 3rd edition, 1770.
- Medical Facts and Experiments, Edinburgh, 1759.
- An Inquiry into the Nature, Cause, and Cure of the Croup, Edinburgh, 1765; French translation, 1810, by F. Ruette.
- Methodus Materiæ Medicæ, Edinburgh, 1770.
- Clinical Experiments, Histories, and Dissections, Edinburgh, 1780; 3rd edition, London, 1783.
