= Alexander Monro Primus =

Scottish surgeon and anatomist

Alexander Monro primus
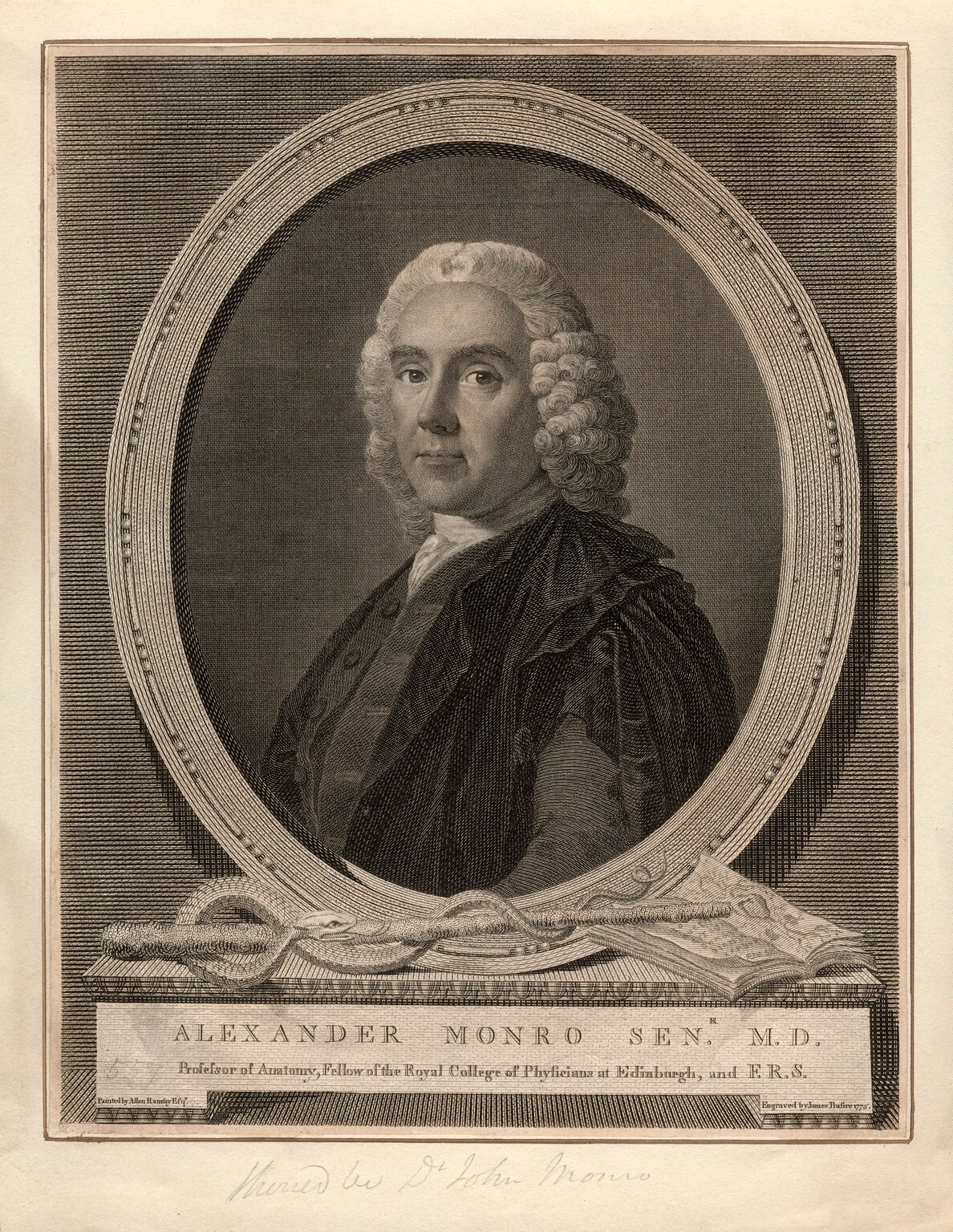
- Alexander Monro by Allan Ramsay (1749)
- Born: Alexander Monro; 19 September 1697; London, England
- Died: 10 July 1767 (aged 69); Edinburgh, Scotland
- Known for: Foundation Professor of Anatomy, Edinburgh University Medical School
- Medical career
- Profession: Professor of Anatomy
- Institutions: University of Edinburgh, Royal Infirmary of Edinburgh
- Notable works: The Anatomy of the Human Bones

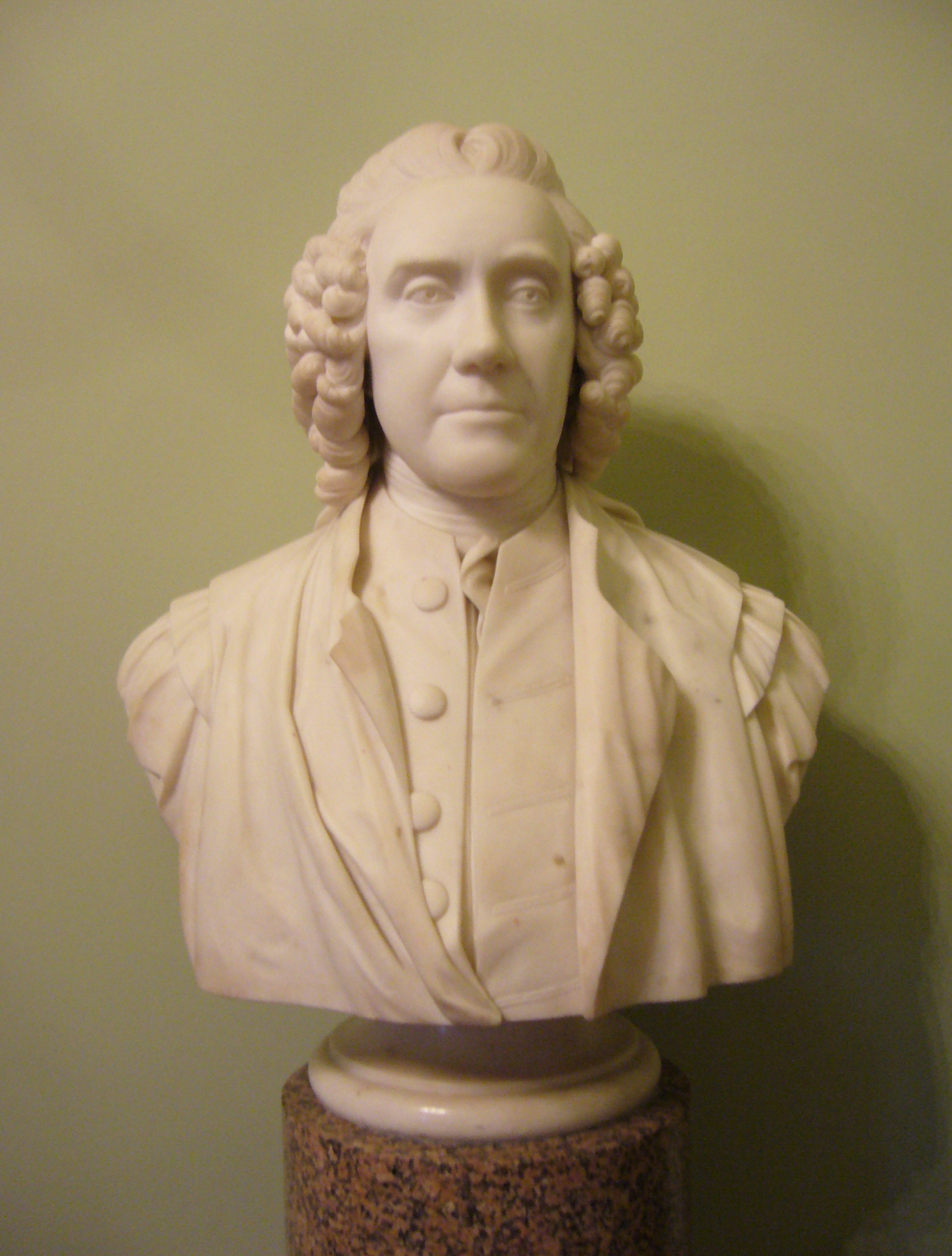
Bust of Monro in Old College, University of Edinburgh

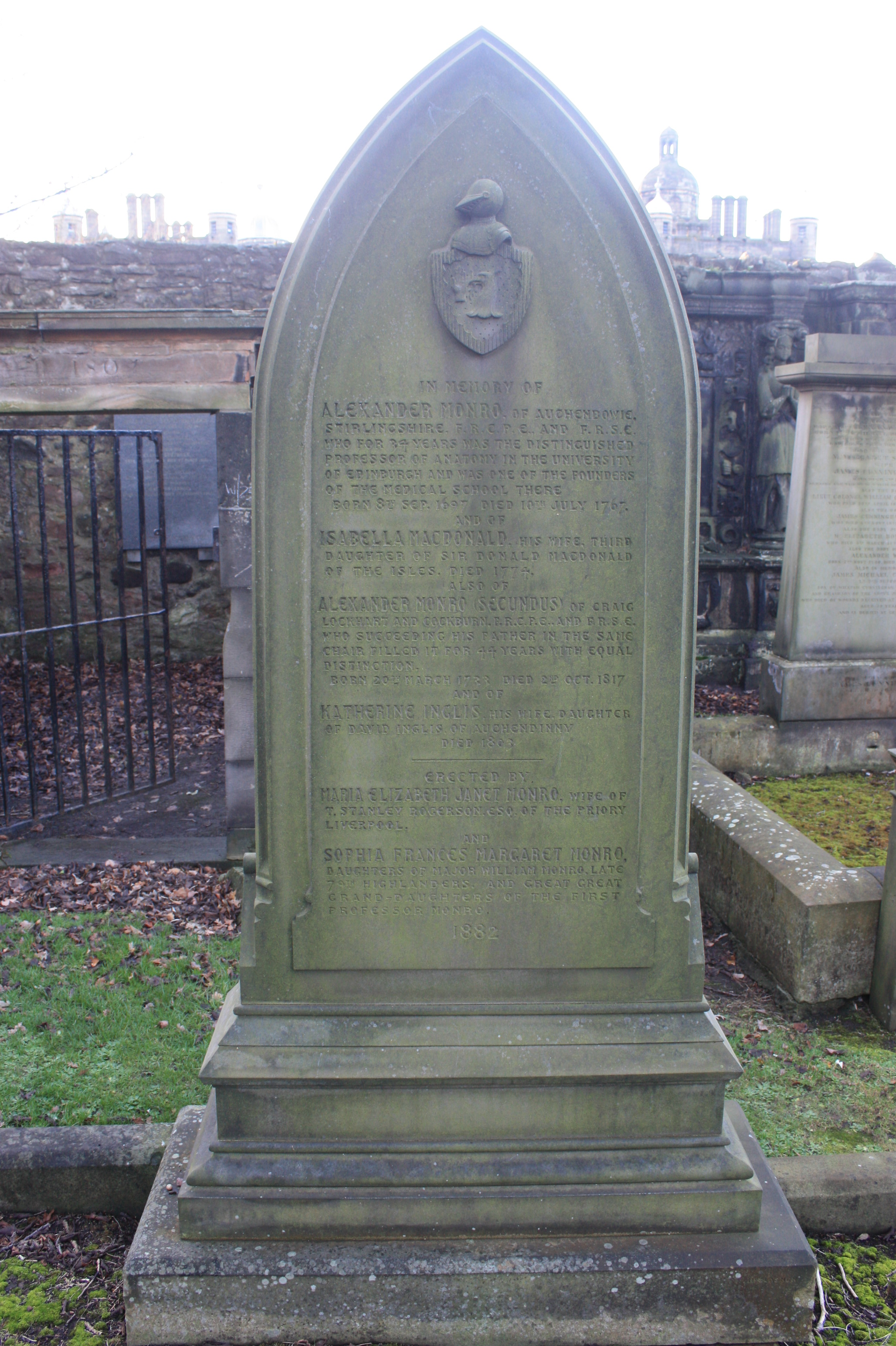
The grave of Alexander Monro primus, Greyfriars Kirkyard

Alexander Monro (19 September 1697 – 10 July 1767) was a Scottish surgeon and anatomist. His father, the surgeon John Monro, had been a prime mover in the foundation of the Edinburgh Medical School and had arranged Alexander's education in the hope that his son might become the first Professor of Anatomy in the new university medical school.

After medical studies in Edinburgh, London, Paris and Leiden, Alexander Monro returned to Edinburgh, and pursued a career as a surgeon and anatomy teacher. With the support of his father and the patronage of the Edinburgh, Lord Provost George Drummond, Alexander Monro was appointed foundation Professor of Anatomy at the University of Edinburgh. His lectures, delivered in English, rather than the conventional Latin, proved popular with students and his qualities as a teacher contributed to the success and reputation of the Edinburgh medical school.

He is known as Alexander Monro primus to distinguish him from his son Alexander Monro secundus and his grandson Alexander Monro tertius who both followed him in the chair of anatomy. These three Monros between them held the Edinburgh University Chair of Anatomy for 126 years.

== Early life and education ==
Alexander Monro was the son of John Monro and his wife, Jean Forbes, who was his first cousin. John Monro was a Monro of Auchenbowie, a cadet branch of Clan Munro, descended from the Monros of Foulis.

John Monro was a military surgeon and his son Alexander was born in London while he was on military duty there. When Alexander was three the family returned to Edinburgh, where John Monro took great care with his son's education. He had him instructed in Latin, Greek and French, and in philosophy, arithmetic and book-keeping.

Alexander attended classes at the University of Edinburgh between 1710 and 1713 but did not graduate.

He was then bound apprentice to his father, who was by now in practice as a surgeon in Edinburgh. During this apprenticeship he also attended courses in botany delivered by George Preston, courses in chemistry by Dr James Crawford and anatomy dissections at Surgeons Hall by Messers Robert Eliot, Adam Drummond and John McGill. He assisted his father in treating the wounded at the Battle of Sheriffmuir in 1715.

== Studies in London, Paris and Leiden ==
In 1717, on completion of his apprenticeship, Alexander Munro was sent to London to study anatomy under William Cheselden, the famous surgeon who was a renowned teacher and a skilful demonstrator. A lasting friendship was formed between the two men.

To gain as much experience as possible Monro lodged in the house of an apothecary and visited patients with him. He also attended lectures by the theologian and mathematician William Whiston and the physicist Francis Hauksbee on experimental philosophy.

He made dissections of the human body and of various animals and demonstrated a natural aptitude for this work. His career was nearly cut short as a result of a scratch on the hand inflicted while he was dissecting the suppurated lung of a subject, known to have phthisis (tuberculosis). His mentor and friend, the Scots born accoucheur and anatomist James Douglas was concerned that he would lose the arm as a result of the soft tissue infection which developed.

Monro took an active part in discussions, and in one of his papers first sketched his "Account of the Bones in General". This would form the basis of his later textbook on osteology. Before he left London he sent home to his father some of his anatomical specimens. His father showed these to members of the Royal College of Physicians and the Incorporation of Surgeons. They were so impressed with the quality of these dissections that Adam Drummond, on seeing them, indicated that would resign his share of the professorship of anatomy in favour of Monro.

In the spring of 1718, Alexander Monro primus went to Paris where attended lectures on botany in the Jardin du Roy. He walked the wards of the hospitals including Hotel Dieu where he attended a course of anatomy given by Bourquet. He performed operations under the direction of Thibaut and had instruction in midwifery from Gregoire, in bandaging from Cesau, and in botany from Pierre-Jean-Baptiste Chomel.

On 16 November 1718, Monro entered as a student of Leiden University to study under Herman Boerhaave, the great physician and teacher, who lectured on the theory and practice of physic. On Boerhaave's recommendation he visited Frederik Ruysch, professor of Anatomy at Amsterdam, where he saw Ruysch's large collection of anatomical dissections and learned from him techniques of preservation of anatomical specimens. Patients from Scotland who came to consult Boerhaave in Leiden were often put under Monro's care. Like many Scottish students at Leiden he did not sit the examinations for the degree of MD.

== Professor of Anatomy ==
On his return to Edinburgh in the autumn of 1719, Monro sat the four part examination to become a Freeman (Fellow) of the Incorporation of Surgeons and was admitted as a Fellow on 19 November. Adam Drummond then fulfilled his promise of resigning his professorship, and John M'Gill did likewise. They also gave a recommendation in favour of Monro to the Town Council, the patrons of the University. This was backed by the Incorporation of Surgeons, and on 22 January 1720 the Council appointed Monro Professor of Anatomy with a salary of £15 sterling, this modest sum being supplemented by the students' fees of three guineas a head.

Monro's original appointment as professor was only at the pleasure of the Town Council, who at that time administered the University or Town's College. In 1722, encouraged by his success, Monro applied to the Council for permanent status, and although the Council had as lately as August 1719 reaffirmed the principle that regentships and professorships were to be held at their pleasure, they now departed from this and on 14 March 1722, nominated Alexander Monro sole Professor of Anatomy in the City and College.

Until 1725, Monro continued to lecture in the old Surgeons' Hall on the south side of Surgeons' Square. The popularity of his teaching had led to an increased demand for cadavers for dissection. Despite the fact that Monro had publicly declared his "...Abhorrence for the vile, abominable and most inhumane Crime of stealing human bodies out of their graves..." public anger was directed against anatomists.

This led to public demonstrations and riots which Monro felt endangered him and his collection of dissected specimens. Monro appealed to the Town Council to allow him to lecture and perform anatomical demonstrations within the relative safety of the University. The Council agreed and Monro moved from Surgeons Hall to the University of Edinburgh, being formally inaugurated to the university chair on 3 November 1725.

The initial medical faculty was completed in February 1726 with the appointment of John Rutherford and John Innes as Professors of the Practice of Physic, Andrew St Clair as Professor of the Institutes of Theory of Medicine, Andrew Plummer as professor of Chemistry, and John Gibson as professor of Midwifery.

== Establishing a teaching hospital ==
John Monro's vision of the new Edinburgh medical school was based on the Leiden model of a medical faculty within a university and with an associated teaching hospital. In 1721, Alexander Monro circulated a pamphlet setting out the case for this hospital. Lord Provost George Drummond helped secure financial backing from local surgeons, physicians, wealthy citizens and Church of Scotland parishes.

Monro and the committee of donors established this hospital in August 1729 in a house in Robertson's Close, rented from the university. This had six beds where the sick poor could be treated and provide clinical teaching for medical students. This 'Hospital for the Sick Poor' or 'Little House' as it was known was the origin of the Royal Infirmary of Edinburgh. In 1736 it received a Royal Charter from King George II, which conferred the 'Royal' designation.

With the growth of the new medical school this soon became too small for purpose and a new teaching hospital was commissioned, designed by the leading architect William Adam. The original hospital moved in 1741 and the new hospital was finally completed in 1745. Among the first admissions to the completed hospital were casualties from the Battle of Prestonpans on 21 September 1745. Monro Primus, a staunch Hanoverian, treated the wounded of both sides at the battlefield and afterwards in the new Royal Infirmary.

== The Anatomy of the Human Bones ==
At the end of 1726, Monro published his only major textbook The Anatomy of the Human Bones, which went through eight editions in his lifetime and a further three after his death. Later editions included a description of The Anatomy of the Human Nerves. It was translated into most European languages and in 1759 a French folio edition was published in Paris with elegant engravings by Joseph Sue, Professor of Anatomy to the Royal Schools of Surgery and to the Royal Academy of Painting and Sculpture in Paris.

Thomas Thomson wrote that the book "may be considered as the completion on the subject, since it would be exceedingly difficult and perfectly unnecessary to introduce any improvements upon the descriptions which Dr Monro has given."

The great reputation attained by Monro's work did much to increase the fame of the new school of medicine on Edinburgh. In 1764, he resigned his professorship, but continued to give clinical lectures at the hospital. In the same year, he published An Account of the Inoculation of Small-pox in Scotland.

== Learned societies ==
As a Freeman (or Fellow) of the Incorporation of Surgeons, Monro continued his surgical practice alongside anatomy teaching. Like all three generations, Monro primus was a Fellow of the Royal College of Physicians of Edinburgh. Monro secundus and Monro tertius were also Presidents of the RCPE.

Monro was elected a Fellow of the Royal Society, on 27 June 1723, on the recommendation of William Cheseldon.

In 1731 Monro was the driving force in the foundation of the Society for the Improvement of Medical Knowledge, and he became its first secretary. The following year the Society began to publish Medical Essays and Observations with Monro as editor. A total of six volumes were published consisting of case reports from around the British Isles, reviews of the literature and book reviews, with most of the reviews being written by Monro himself. These were popular and important in their day, being translated into French, German and Dutch. Medical Essays and Observations regarded as the first regular medical journal in Britain and one of the first in the world It was also the first medical journal to introduce anonymised peer review. This innovative publication helped to establish Monro as a major figure of the Scottish Enlightenment.

After a period of inactivity the society was reformed as the Philosophical Society, which also lapsed but was revived in 1752 with Monro and the philosopher David Hume as joint secretaries. In 1783 the Philosophical Society received a Royal Charter to become the Royal Society of Edinburgh. Monro was also a member of the Select Society, which had been founded in 1754 by the painter Allan Ramsay "...to discover the most effectual methods of promoting the good of the country."

In 1765 Monro published an account of the extent of inoculation against smallpox in Scotland, in which he estimated that only 88 of Scotland's doctors, out of an estimated 270, had taken up the procedure and had inoculated a total of 5,554 people.

== Family and later life ==
In 1725, he married Isabella MacDonald (1694 -1774), third daughter of Sir Donald MacDonald of Sleat. They had three sons and a daughter.

The eldest son, John Monro (1725-1789), became an advocate and then procurator Fiscal to the High Court of Admiralty. He inherited Achenbowie to become 5th of Auchenbowie.

The second son, Donald Monro (1727–1802), graduated MD and became Physician-General to the army, physician to St George's Hospital, London and a Fellow of the Royal Society.

The third son Alexander Monro secundus (1733–1817) succeeded his father as Professor of anatomy at the University of Edinburgh.

For Margaret (died 1802), his only surviving daughter, Monro primus wrote An essay on female conduct 'intended to improve her education.

From 1730, Monro lived in a large flat on the south side of the Lawnmarket, moving in 1750 to Covenant Close off the High Street.

== Death ==
He died at his home in Covenant Close, Edinburgh of rectal cancer on 10 July 1767. He is buried in Greyfriars Kirkyard in the centre of Edinburgh with his wife and son, Alexander.

== Works ==
- Osteology, A treatise on the anatomy of the human bones with An account of the reciprocal motions of the heart and A description of the human lacteal sac and duct – Online: the 1741 edition.
- An account of the inoculation of small pox in Scotland. Edinburgh:1765, printed by Drummond and J. Balfour ….
- An essay on female conduct. 1739.
