= Battle of Dunkeld =

Battle of the Jacobite rising of 1689

- Part of the Jacobite rising of 1689
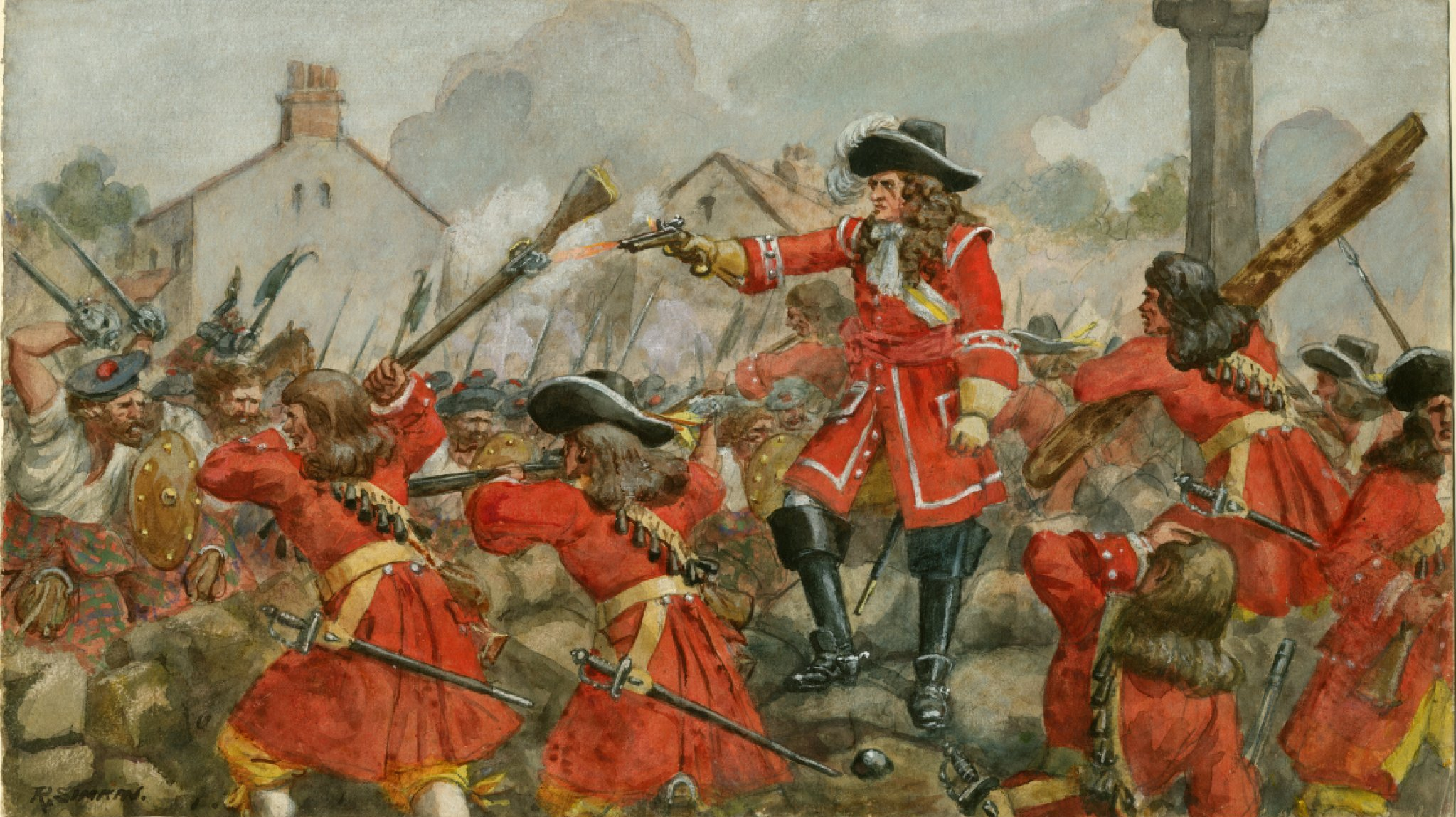
- The Earl of Angus' Regiment repulsing a Jacobite charge at the battle
Date	21 August 1689
Location	Dunkeld, Scotland 56°33′56″N 3°35′13″W
Result	Government victory

Belligerents
Scotland	Jacobites

Commanders and leaders
William Cleland †; George Munro	Alexander Cannon

Strength
c. 1,200	c. 5,000

Casualties and losses
c. 50 killed or wounded	c. 300 killed or wounded

Registered battlefield
- Designated: 14 December 2012
- Reference no.: BTL32
- Location within Scotland

The Battle of Dunkeld (Scottish Gaelic: Blàr Dhùn Chaillinn) was fought between Jacobite clans supporting the deposed king James VII of Scotland and a regiment of covenanters supporting William of Orange, in the streets around Dunkeld Cathedral, Dunkeld, Scotland, on 21 August 1689 and formed part of the Jacobite rising of 1689, commonly called Dundee's rising in Scotland. The battlefield was added to the Inventory of Historic Battlefields in Scotland in 2012.

== Background ==
Following the death of Viscount Dundee in the Jacobite victory at the Battle of Killiecrankie, command of the Jacobites was passed to Colonel Alexander Cannon, leader of the recruits from Ireland, in preference to the 60-year-old veteran Sir Ewen Cameron of Lochiel, one of the most formidable Highland chiefs. Cameron was so insulted at this perceived slight that he left, taking some of his clan with him. With the Scottish Privy Council preparing to leave Scotland in the wake of an expected Jacobite onslaught, the council ordered the newly formed Cameronian regiment under the command of Lieutenant Colonel William Cleland to move north from Perth and to hold Dunkeld at all costs.

The Cameronian regiment takes its name from Richard Cameron (1648–1680), a Scottish religious reformer and covenanting leader from the Scottish Lowlands, and was raised largely from the tenantry of the Marquess of Douglas, chief of Clan Douglas. The Cameronian regiment subsequently became the 26th (The Cameronian) Regiment of Foot, and then the Cameronians (Scottish Rifles).

== Battle ==
Dunkeld was not protected by town walls, so Cleland ordered his troops to take up defensive positions in the cathedral, because it was surrounded by an enclosing wall, and the nearby mansion of the Marquess of Atholl. The fighting began when the Jacobites, who outnumbered the Cameronians by more than four to one, stormed the town from all sides. They were initially successful, forcing the Cameronians back from all their outlying positions. although in the town's narrow, winding streets there was no room for the type of Highland charge that had succeeded at Killiecrankie. The Cameronian regiment's 27-year-old Colonel William Cleland, a veteran of the Covenanter cause, died in the first hour of battle by taking one bullet in the liver and another in the head, before dragging himself out of sight so that his men would not see him fall. Command fell to Captain George Munro of Auchinbowie who led them to victory.

For sixteen hours the battle raged, as the Cameronians were gradually forced back. Some of the Highlanders who had barricaded themselves into houses were trapped inside and burned alive. At 11:00 pm, depleted of energy and ammunition, the Highlanders decided to call it a day and withdrew, leaving 300 of their men dead or dying in the town. The Cameronians are reported to have stripped lead from the roof of Atholl House to keep firing because they had also exhausted their munitions. Holes caused by musket balls are still visible in the east gable of Dunkeld Cathedral. With the battle over, the Cameronian Covenanters claimed a war-winning victory. Losses on the Williamite side are unclear, but ranged from 20 to 50. Colonel Cleland was buried in the cathedral.
