= Alexander Munro of Bearcrofts =

Sir Alexander Munro of Bearcrofts (died 4 January 1704) was a Scottish soldier and politician of the 17th century.

== Lineage ==
The Munro of Milntown family descends from John Munro, 1st of Milntown, the second son of Hugh Munro, 9th Baron of Foulis (d. 1425). Three generations after John Munro, 1st of Milntown, is George Munro, 4th of Milntown, who became one of the most prominent ministers in the Reformed Church in the north of Scotland. His third son, also called George, 1st of Pitlunde, followed in his footsteps. This George's second eldest son was Alexander Munro, 1st of Bearcrofts.

== Career ==
Alexander took up the army as his profession and served for some time as a Major in an infantry regiment in Ireland. He was knighted for his distinguished services in the army and was appointed Commissioner of Stirling. Alexander fought for King Charles II at the Battle of Worcester (3 September 1651). He survived the battle and was not captured, afterward he took to the study of the law.

In 1657 he bought a small Stirlingshire property called Bearcrofts, which lies on the flat southern shore of the Firth of Forth near Grangemouth. In 1660 he was appointed Commissary of Stirlingshire, that is to say, judge of the local court, representing the old ecclesiastical court, with jurisdiction in questions of marriage, divorce, affiliation and testaments. Two years later he passed advocate of the Scottish bar, and in 1669 he was nominated one of the six clerks in the Court of Session, the supreme court in Scotland. In June 1676, when the staff of clerks was reduced to three, he lost his place and, attributing this result to the machinations of the Duke of Lauderdale, he joined the malcontent Presbyterian party.

In the spring of 1683 he and several sympathisers went to London, ostensibly to arrange for a Scots colony in the Carolinas, but really to help the Earl of Shaftesbury in a great Whig plot to overthrow the King and Government and to exclude the Catholic Duke of York from succession to the throne.

An inner circle of conspirators, including nine of the Scotsmen except Robert Ferguson, had a scheme to waylay and murder the King and the Duke of York at the Rye House while on their way from Newmarket to London. In June 1683 the Government discovered both plots, and Commissary Munro, among many others, was arrested. After a Preliminary examination by the Privy Council he and a dozen other Scotsmen were sent to Edinburgh for trial and ware imprisoned in the Tolbooth in solitary confinement for ten months. The authorities raised prosecutions against 23 conspirators, all but three being fugitives, and in order to get evidence they decided to apply torture to some of the prisoners. Munro was threatened with the "boots" (an instrument of torture involving the crushing of limbs) and confessed evidence which was used at several of the trials. His weakness "did so discompose and confound him, to discover others, that he desperately offered money to the keeper of the Tolbuith's man to run him throw (sic) with his sword."

He was then pardoned and liberated, but remained in obscurity till the Revolution of 1688. In 1690 he entered the Scottish Parliament as the shire commissioner for Stirlingshire and at first joined the "Club", the organized opposition to the Court party. He afterwards supported the Government and in 1695 was knighted and granted a pension of £150 per annum as a recompense for his sufferings. According to the Clan Munro Association historian, R.W Munro, the report of the official inquest in the Massacre of Glencoe, which most subsequent accounts of it have been based on, may have been written by Alexander Munro of Bearcrofts who the commissioners, appointed by William III of England, chose as their clerk.

He died on 4 January 1704, leaving three daughters and two sons.

== Family ==
Alexander's wife was Lillias, daughter of John Eastoun of Couston in Linlithgowshire. Their sons were:

1. George Munro, 1st of Auchinbowie, a successful Scottish soldier.
2. John Munro, 2nd of Bearcrofts, a surgeon and professor at the University of Edinburgh.

(They also had three daughters).

== See also ==
- Clan Munro
- Munro (disambiguation)
