= John Rutherford (physician) =

Scottish physician

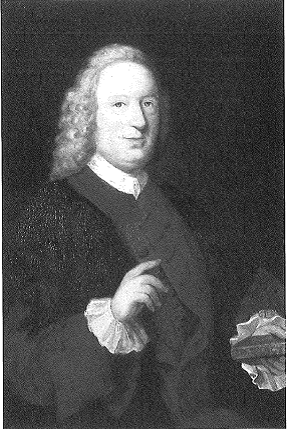
John Rutherford (1695–1779)

John Rutherford (1 August 1695 – 6 March 1779, Edinburgh) was a Scottish physician and professor at the University of Edinburgh Medical School. He is the father of the scientist Daniel Rutherford and the grandfather of the writer Walter Scott.

Rutherford was one of the eminent physicians of his time. He taught at the University of Edinburgh, which was one of the world's leading medical schools in the 18th century. He was one of the founding professors of the University of Edinburgh Medical School and was appointed the Professor of Practice of Medicine from 1726 to 1765. Rutherford was a Fellow of the Royal College of Physicians of Edinburgh.

He is probably best known for pioneering clinical teaching, which meant that students were learning in the hospital with live patients rather than receiving classroom teaching. This method was first introduced by Herman Boerhaave at University of Leiden and soon after used at the University of Edinburgh as well. However, its early deployment was somewhat limited since the university only had a small ward and hence only a few patients available for clinical teaching. In 1741 the new Royal Infirmary with 228 beds was opened, and in 1748 John Rutherford started to provide clinical teaching to all his students. These lessons proved to be extremely popular and soon became a compulsory part of the medical education.

Two manuscript copies of early clinical lectures given by Rutherford on the wards of the Edinburgh Royal Infirmary survive as part of the Manchester Medical Manuscripts Collection held by special collections at the University of Manchester.
