= Alexander Monro Secundus =

Scottish anatomist, physician and medical educator

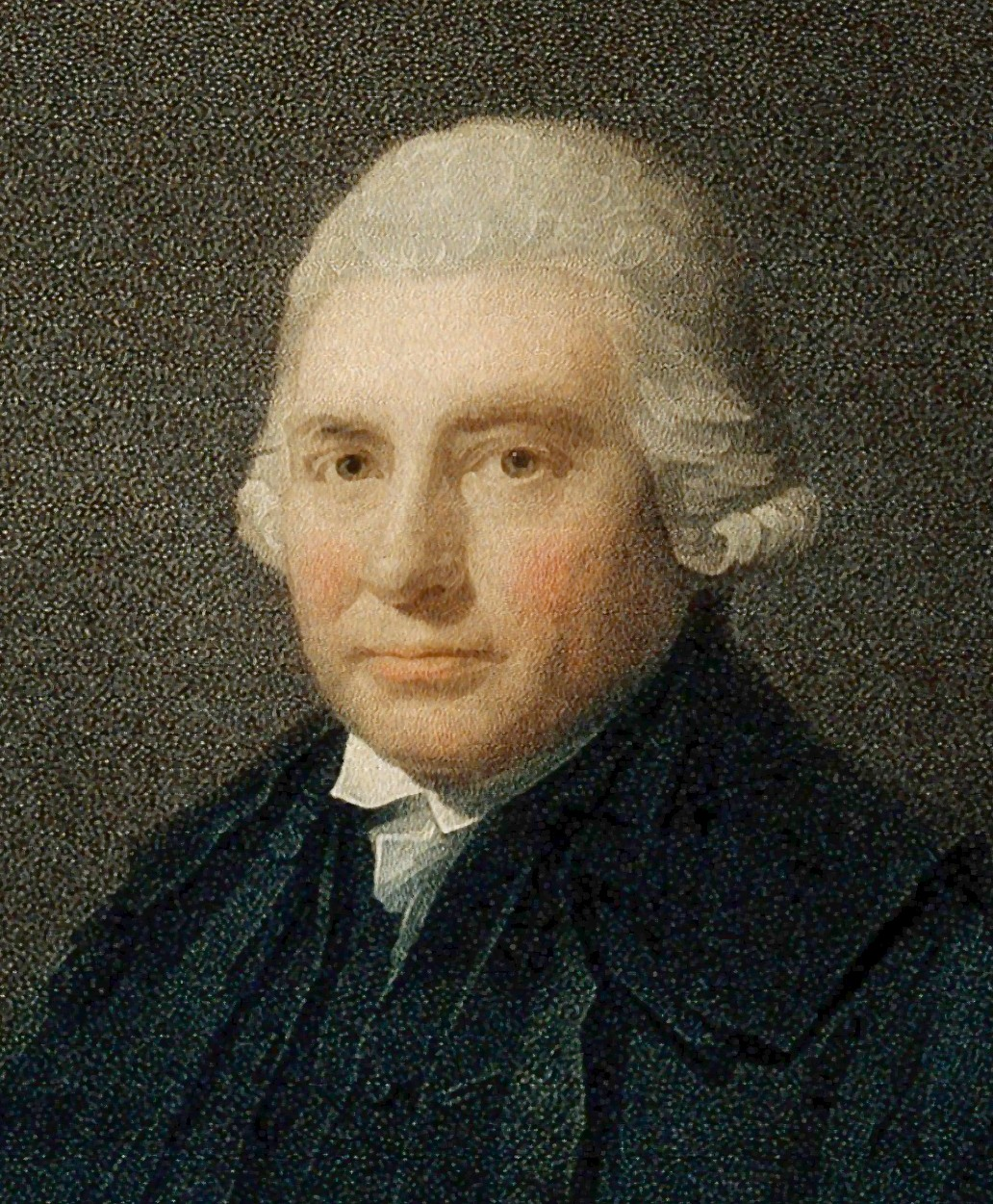
Alexander Monro secundus, coloured engraving (1800) by James Heath after Henry Raeburn

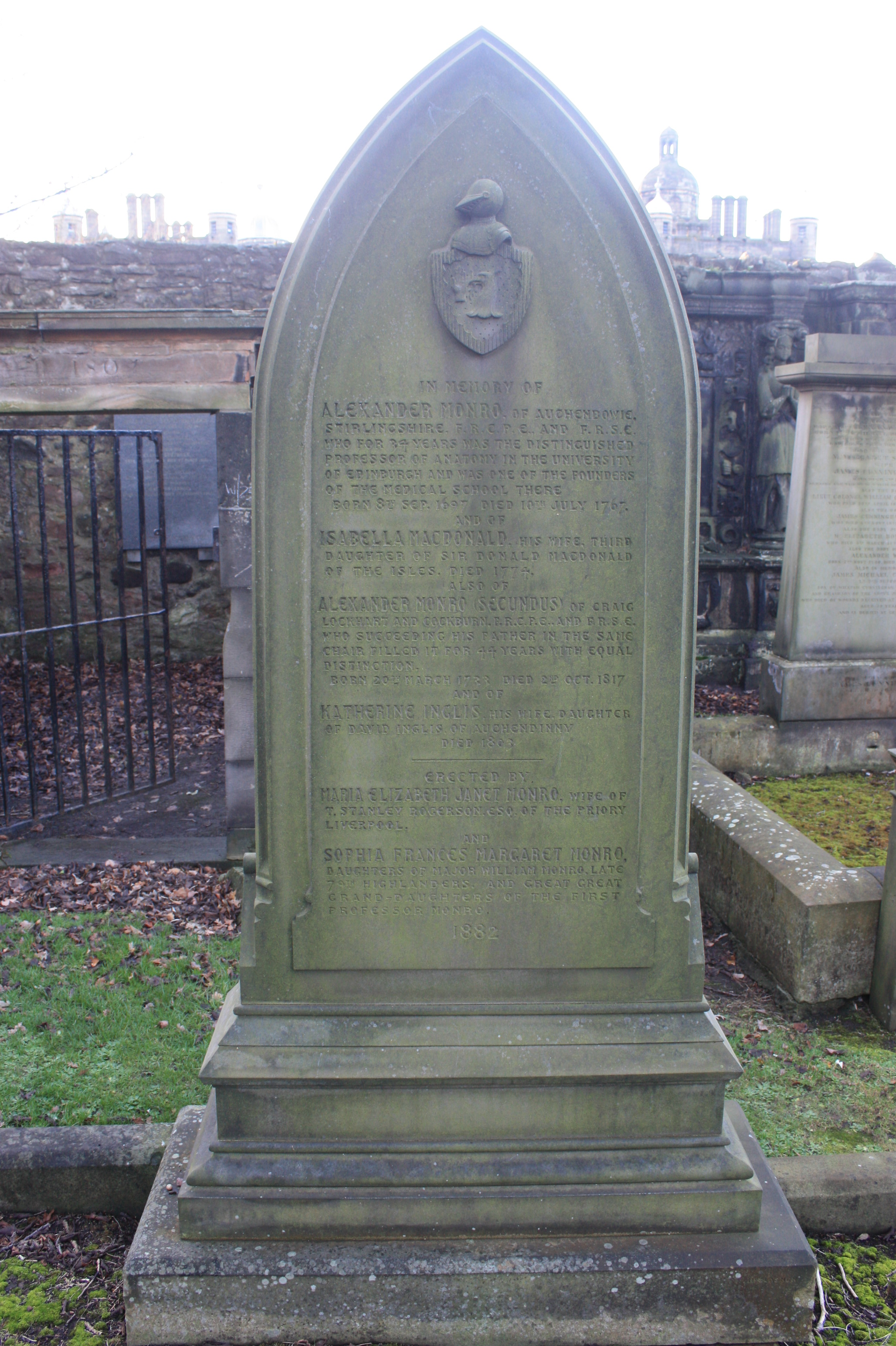
The grave of Alexander Monro secundus Greyfriars Kirkyard

Alexander Monro of Craiglockhart and Cockburn FRSE FRCPE (22 May 1733 – 2 October 1817) was a Scottish anatomist, physician and medical educator. He is typically known as Alexander Monro secundus to distinguish him as the second of three generations of physicians of the same name. His students included the naval physician and abolitionist Thomas Trotter. Monro was from the distinguished Monro of Auchenbowie family. His major achievements included, describing the lymphatic system, providing the most detailed elucidation of the musculo-skeletal system to date and introducing clinical medicine into the curriculum. He is known for the Monro–Kellie doctrine on intracranial pressure, a hypothesis developed by Monro and his former pupil George Kellie, who worked as a surgeon in the port of Leith.

== Life ==
Alexander Monro, the third and youngest son of Isabella Macdonald of Sleat, and Alexander Monro primus was born at Edinburgh on 20 May 1733. He was sent with his brothers to Mr Mundell's school, where he learned the rudiments of Latin and Greek, and showed early evidences of great ability. Among his school-fellows were Ilay Campbell who was afterwards Lord President of the Court of Session and William Ramsay of Barnton, the banker.

Monro's father decided to make him his successor and sent him to the University of Edinburgh when he was 12 years old, to attend the ordinary course of philosophy before beginning his professional training. He studied mathematics under Colin Maclaurin and ethics under Sir John Pringle. He was also a favourite of Matthew Stewart, Professor of Experimental Philosophy.

He showed an interest for anatomy and after entering on the medical course, aged 18, he became a useful assistant to his father in the dissecting room. He attended the lectures of Drs Rutherford, Andrew Plummer, Alston and Sinclair. He possessed an insatiable thirst for medical knowledge, an uncommon share of perseverance, and a good memory.

In the session of 1753–54, his father Alexander Monro primus found his class too large for the lecture room and had to divide the class, repeating his lecture in the evening. This he found difficult, and he experimented with his son (Alexander Monro secundus) taking the evening class. The results were satisfactory and so he presented a petition to the Town Council at the close of the session asking them to appoint his son formally as his successor. This petition was granted on 10 June and Alexander Monro secondus was admitted as conjunct professor on 11 July.

Monro secundus took his degree as Doctor of Medicine on 20 October 1755. He then proceeded to his studies abroad. He spent a short time in London, where he attended the lectures of William Hunter. He next visited Paris and on 17 September 1757 entered Leyden University where he formed a friendship with two famous anatomists, Bernhard Siegfried Albinus and Petrus Camper. However his foreign studies were prosecuted principally at Berlin, where he worked under the celebrated Professor Meckel, in whose house he lived. Alexander spent some time in Edinburgh during early 1757 in order to fill the place of his father, who was confined to the house by illness. He finally was admitted a licentiate of the Royal College of Physicians of Edinburgh on 2 May 1758 and as a Fellow on 1 May 1759. He was to be elected President of the College in 1779. On 12 April 1782 Monro secundus was one of the founding members of the Harveian Society of Edinburgh and served as President in 1785. In 1784 he was elected a member of the Aesculapian Club.

Monro primus delivered the opening anatomy and surgery lectures of the 1758–59 course and then handed the work to his son Alexander Monro secundus.

Monro secundus, although a physician who never practised as a surgeon, in 1777 successfully resisted the appointment of a separate professor of surgery. He gave a full course of lectures, including surgery, every year from 1759 to 1800. From 1800 to 1807, he delivered part of the course, his son Alexander tertius completing it, and in 1808 gave the introductory lecture only.

This was his last lecture, and after it his faculties gradually decayed. He became drowsy after dinner, and his nose used to bleed from time to time. In 1813, he had an apoplectic attack.

In later life he was living at 30 St Andrew Square in the New Town.

He died 2 October 1817. He is buried with his parents and wife, Katherine Inglis (died 1803) in Greyfriars Kirkyard in central Edinburgh. The grave lies west of the church and north of the Adam mausoleum.

== Publications ==
In 1771, he wrote a paper on the effect of drugs on the nervous system. He published two controversial observations on the lymphatics in 1758, maintaining that he—in De Venis Lymphaticis Valvulosis, a short essay printed at Berlin in 1758 and reprinted in 1761 and 1770—had first correctly described the general communications of the lymphatic system. William Hunter disputed this vigorously before they both realized Francis Glisson had published on the topic a century before, to insufficient general notice. The German Friedrich Hoffmann is now sometimes credited for preceding all three.

In 1783, he published in Edinburgh Observations on the Structure and Functions of the Nervous System, dedicated to the Right Hon. Henry Dundas, and it is in consequence of the description in this book of the communication between the lateral ventricles of the brain that his name is known to every student of medicine at the present day. The opening now always spoken of as the "foramen of Monro" is very small in the healthy brain, but when abnormal accumulation of CSF on the brain is present (known as hydrocephalus) may be as wide as 20 mm. It was this morbid condition that drew Monro's attention to the foramen, and he first described it in a paper read before the Philosophical Society of Edinburgh in 1764, but gives a fuller account in this work on the nervous system. A further important observation in this paper was that the healthy cranial cavity is rigid and of constant volume and, he argued, that since the brain "is nearly incompressible, the quantity of blood within the head must remain the same." This was taken up by his former student George Kellie who set out the hypothesis that the contents of the skull (blood, CSF, and brain tissue) are a state of volume equilibrium, so that any increase in volume of one of the cranial constituents must be compensated by a decrease in volume of another. This has since been validated and is known as the Monro–Kellie doctrine.

He had always paid much attention to comparative anatomy, and published in 1785 The Structure and Physiology of Fishes Explained and Compared with Those of Man and Other Animals. In 1788, he published an account of seventy pairs of bursae under the title Description of all the Bursae Mucosse of the Human Body, their Structure, Accidents, and Diseases, and Operations for their Cure, which is stated by several anatomical writers to be the first full description of the bursae.

In 1793, he published Experiments on the Nervous System with Opium and Metalline Substances, to Determine the Nature and Effects of Animal Electricity. These experiments led him to the conclusion that nerve force was not identical with electricity. His last book, Three Treatises on the Brain, the Eye, and the Ear, was published at Edinburgh in 1797.

Manuscript copies of notes of his lectures on anatomy delivered in 1774 and 1775 are preserved in the library of the Royal Medical and Chirurgical Society of London, and some Essays and Heads of Lectures on Anatomy, Physiology, Pathology, Surgery, very imperfectly arranged, were printed by his son Alexander in 1840.

== Sources ==
- "The Monros of Auchinbowie and Cognate Families". By John Alexander Inglis. Edinburgh. Printed privately by T and A Constable. Printers to His Majesty. 1911.
