= John Alexander Inglis =

Scottish landowner, advocate and historian

John Alexander Inglis of Auchendinny and Redhall FRSE KC LLB (1873–1941) was a Scottish landowner, advocate and historian. He specialised in family histories of Scotland’s gentry.

== Life ==
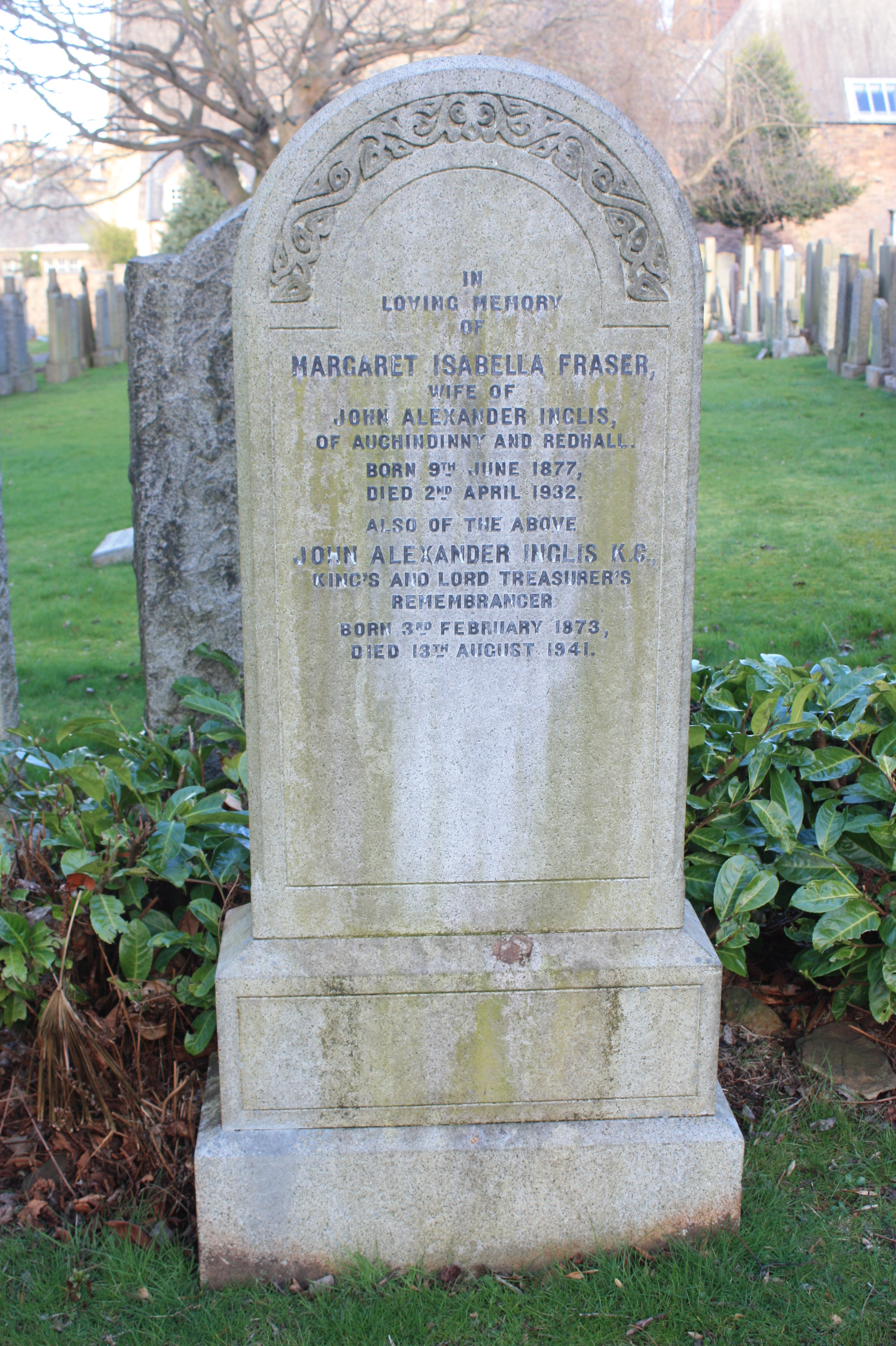
The grave of John Alexander Inglis, Dean Cemetery, Edinburgh

He was born at Montpelier Lawn in Cheltenham in England on 3 February 1873 into a Scottish family. He was the eldest son of Alexander Inglis (1830-1899) of Auchendinny and Redhall: two large estates on the south-west of Edinburgh. His mother was Florence Feeney, daughter of the newspaper proprietor, John Frederick Feeney. His younger brother was Charles Edward Inglis FRS the noted civil engineer. He was the great grandson of both Vice Admiral John Inglis RN and Dr Alexander Monro (tertius).

He was educated at Cheltenham College and won a scholarship to study Law at Christ’s College in Oxford University graduating MA.

He qualified as an advocate in Edinburgh in 1898 and was raised to Kings Counsel in 1926. In 1927 he was elected a Fellow of the Royal Society of Scotland. His proposers were James Haig Ferguson, Ralph Allan Sampson, Edward Theodore Salvesen (Lord Salvesen), and Andrew Constable, Lord Constable. He served as the Society’s Vice President 1939 to 1942.

He was a Brigadier in the Royal Company of Archers (the King’s Bodyguard). In the First World War he was Assistant Food Commissioner for Midlothian in charge of food control. He was also a Trustee of the National Library of Scotland and was involved in its relocation to George IV Bridge.

He died in Edinburgh on 13 August 1941. He is buried with his wife in Dean Cemetery in western Edinburgh. The grave lies midway along the main north-south path, facing west.

== Family ==
In 1903 he was married to Margaret Isabella Fraser (1877 – 1932).

== Family tree ==
John Inglis family tree

George Inglis	John Inglis
Barbara Inglis	Admiral John Inglis	Alexander Monro (tertius)
James Coutts Crawford	Jane Inglis	George Inglis	John Inglis	Maria Monro
Coutts Crawford	Alexander Inglis
John Alexander Inglis

== Publications ==
- The Monros of Auchinbowie and Cognate Families (1911)
- The Scotts of Harperrig (1914)
- The Nisbets of Carfin (1916)
- The Family of Inglis of Auchindinny and Redhall (1935)
- Sir Adam Otterburn, King’s Advocate (1935)
- Sir John Hay, “The Incendiary” (1578-1654) Clerk Register of Scotland, Provost of Edinburgh (1937)
