= Christopher Irvine (physician) =

Scottish physician and surgeon

- Born: c.1620
- Died: 1693
- Education: University of Edinburgh
- Known for: Royal historiographer
- Medical career
- Profession: Physician and surgeon

Christopher Irvine of Bonshaw (c. 1620–1693) was a Scottish physician and surgeon who was the first medically qualified member of the Incorporation of Surgeons and Barbers of Edinburgh. A prolific author, he became historiographer to King Charles II and to King James II and VII.

== Early life and education ==
Christopher Irvine of Bonshaw was born around 1620 as the son of Christopher Irvine of Robgill Tower, Annandale, a barrister of the Temple and member of the Irvine family of Bonshaw, Dumfriesshire.

Irvine matriculated at the University of Edinburgh but was expelled for initially refusing to sign the National Covenant in 1638. For a time he resorted to school teaching at Leith and at Preston, but after being reinstated he graduated MA in 1645. He appears to have graduated in medicine before this date, since, in the list of graduates in arts from the University of Edinburgh in 1645 he was designated "Medicinae Doctor" indicating that he had probably obtained a medical degree from a university in continental Europe.

Irvine was admitted to the Incorporation of Surgeons and Barbers of Edinburgh in 1658.

== Career ==
Initially a Royalist, Irvine joined King Charles II at his camp at Atholl in June 1651 and travelled with the Royalist army as they marched into England. After the King’s defeat at the Battle of Worcester in September 1651 he served the Parliamentarians as surgeon to General George Monck's army of occupation in Scotland, a post he retained until the Restoration, after which he became surgeon to the Horse Guards.

After serving under Cromwell, Monck would later play a leading role in the restoration of Charles II and like him, Irvine reverted to supporting the monarch. He served under Charles II acting as a historiographer and as Physician General for Scotland

It is not clear how much time he spent as a surgeon in Edinburgh, and he did not own a shop in the city which was unusual for Edinburgh surgeons who practised as surgeon-apothecaries. Irvine had as his apprentice in 1689 John Monro, who would later go on to play a prominent part in the founding of the Edinburgh medical school and become in effect the founder of the famous Monro dynasty of anatomists. Monro was allowed to attend another surgical master, William Borthwick because "the Doctor [Irvine] does not keep a public shop whereby the said John Monro may get insight and knowledge into the art of chirurgerie".

Although he did not hold office in the Incorporation he was active in its affairs. While the 1505 Seal of Cause (or Charter) had set out educational standards for the surgeon's apprentices at the beginning of the 16th century, these appear to have slipped by the start of the 17th. Irvine in 1661 was instrumental in reinforcing educational discipline, so that apprentices who failed to satisfy the examining committee were not allowed to proceed.

Irvine was concerned that the establishment of the Royal College of Physicians of Edinburgh in 1681 would adversely affect his practice. He petitioned the Privy Council, setting out his education, degrees and army service asking that his practice in medicine should not be demeaned by "the new College, composed of men altogether his junior in the studies of philosophy and the practice of physick". This was granted by the Privy Council and confirmed by an Act of the Scottish Parliament in 1685. He was therefore able to continue in practice as a surgeon and physician. On the accession of James VII and II in 1685 his royal appointment was confirmed, although Clippendale describes this as a "historiographer" rather than a royal physician. He continued in this post until the accession of King William in 1688.

== Publications ==
Irvine was the first medically qualified graduate admitted to the Incorporation and authored a number of published works.

He translated Anatomia Sambuci by the German physician Martin Blochwich (1602-1629) which described the botany of the elder tree and its berries, together with medicinal recipes for elderberry preparations. His medical textbook Medicina magnetica or, The Rare and Wonderful Art of Curing by Sympathy was published in 1656 and dedicated to General Monck in whose army he had served. In it he seeks to promote the medicine of Paracelsus.

He edited Medica Omnia a work by the Dutch physician and anatomist Joannes Waleus (1604-1649) of Leyden.

In 1658 he published Bellum Grammaticale, a version of Andrea Guarna's 1512 original, written in Latin as a drama describing a war between Latin verbs and nouns and designed to help teach the principles of Latin grammar.

Two of his publications explained the derivation of Scottish place names. Locorum, nominum propriorum … quae in Latinis Scotorum historiis occurrunt explicatio vernacula was published in 1665 and ‘Historiæ Scoticæ nomenclatura Latino-vernacula, published in 1682 and again in 1697. The first edition was dedicated to James, Duke of York, at that time Lord High Commissioner of Scotland and later King James II and VII.

== Family and death ==
Irvine married Margaret Wishart, daughter of the Laird of Potterrow. They had two sons, Christopher, who became a physician, and James. Christopher Irvine died between 9 May and 19 June 1693.

== Selected publications ==
=== Authored ===
- Medicina magnetica or, The Rare and Wonderful Art of Curing by Sympathy, 1656.
- Bellum Grammaticale. 1658.
- Locorum, nominum propriorum … quae in Latinis Scotorum historiis occurrunt explicatio vernacula. 1665.
- Historiæ Scoticæ nomenclatura Latino-vernacula. 1682 (reprinted 1697).

=== Translated and edited ===
- Martin Blochwich Anatomia Sambuci (translator)
- Joannes Waleus Medica Omnia ad chyli & sanguinis circulationem eleganter concinnata &c'. 1660. (editor)
