= Mario Beger =

German politician (born 1966)

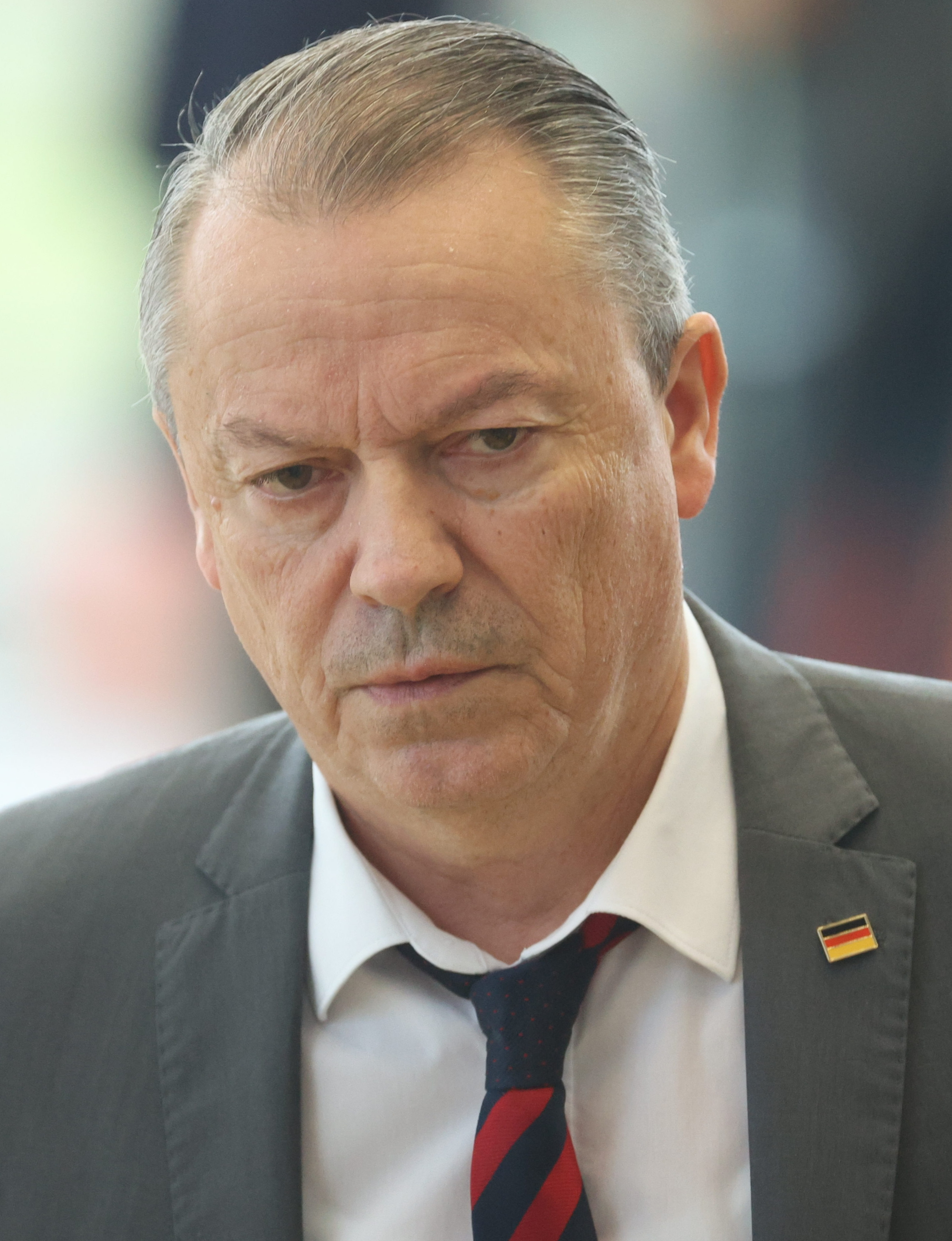
- Beger in 2024

Member of the Landtag of Saxony
- Incumbent
- Assumed office 29 September 2014
- Constituency: Meißen 2 (2019–present)

Personal details
- Born: 11 June 1966 (age 59) Großenhain
- Party: Alternative for Germany (since 2013)

Mario Beger (born 11 June 1966 in Großenhain) is a German politician serving as a member of the Landtag of Saxony since 2014. He is the treasurer of the Alternative for Germany in Meissen.
