= Wildenhain =

- Ortsteil of Großenhain
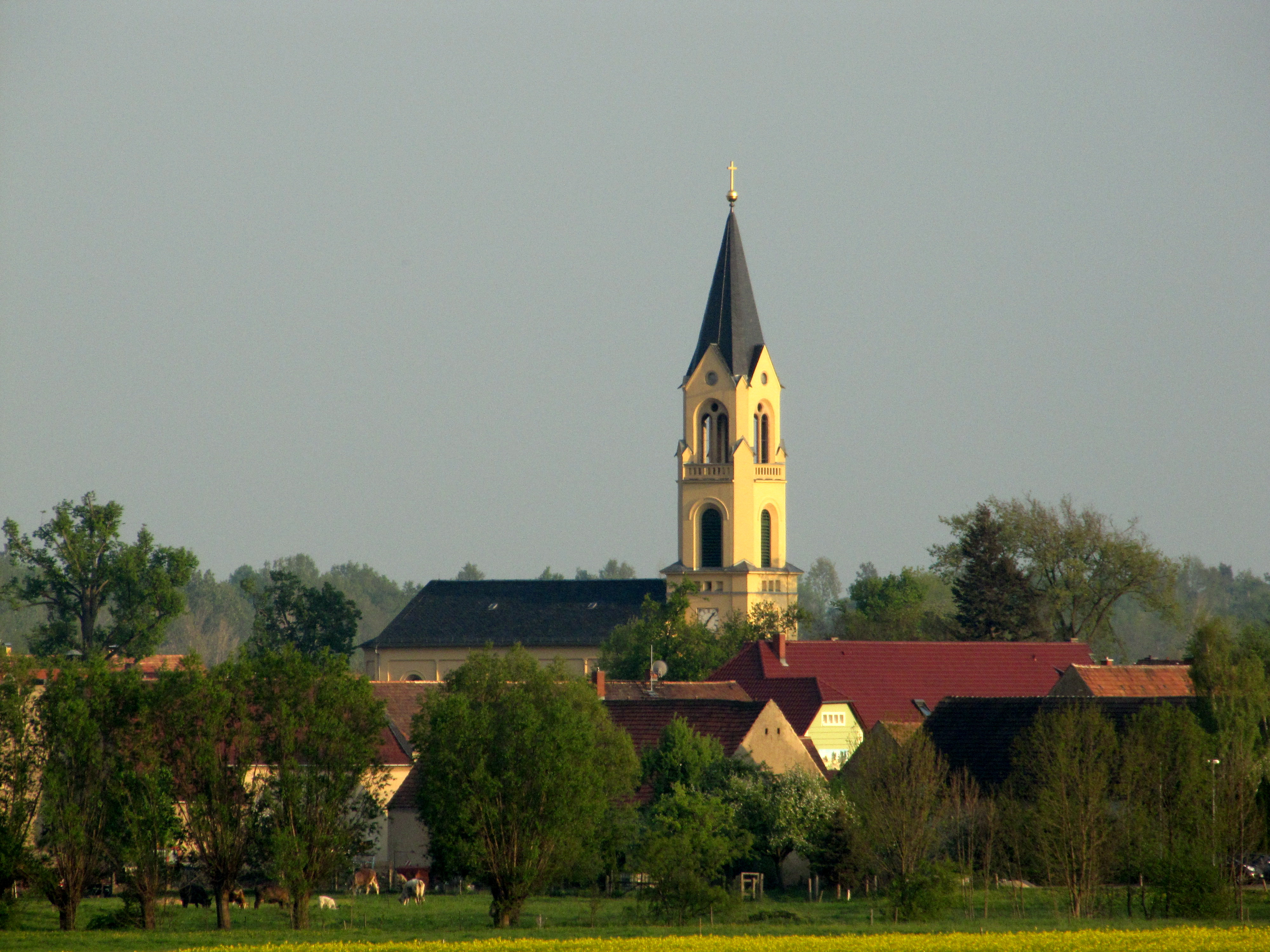
- Wildenhain village and church, viewed from the north
- Interactive map of Wildenhain
- Location within Germany Location within Saxony
- Coordinates: 51°18′30″N 13°28′36″E
- Country: Germany
- State: Saxony
- District: Meißen
- Town: Großenhain
- Subdivisions: 4

Area
  - Total: 33.45 km^{2} (12.92 sq mi)
- Elevation: 110 m (360 ft)

Population (2006-12-31)
  - Total: 1,723
  - Density: 51.51/km^{2} (133.4/sq mi)
- Time zone: UTC+01:00 (CET)
  - Summer (DST): UTC+02:00 (CEST)
- Postal codes: 01561
- Dialling codes: 03522
- Vehicle registration: MEI, GRH, RG, RIE
- Website: www.grossenhain.de

Wildenhain is a village and a former municipality in the district of Meißen, in Saxony, Germany. Since 1 October 2009, it is part of the town Großenhain.

== Population ==
As of 2022, the population of Wildenhain is 410

Population (2011 cons)	Population (2022 cons)	Decrease(%)
465	410	-13.4%
