= John Monro (surgeon) =

Scottish anatomist

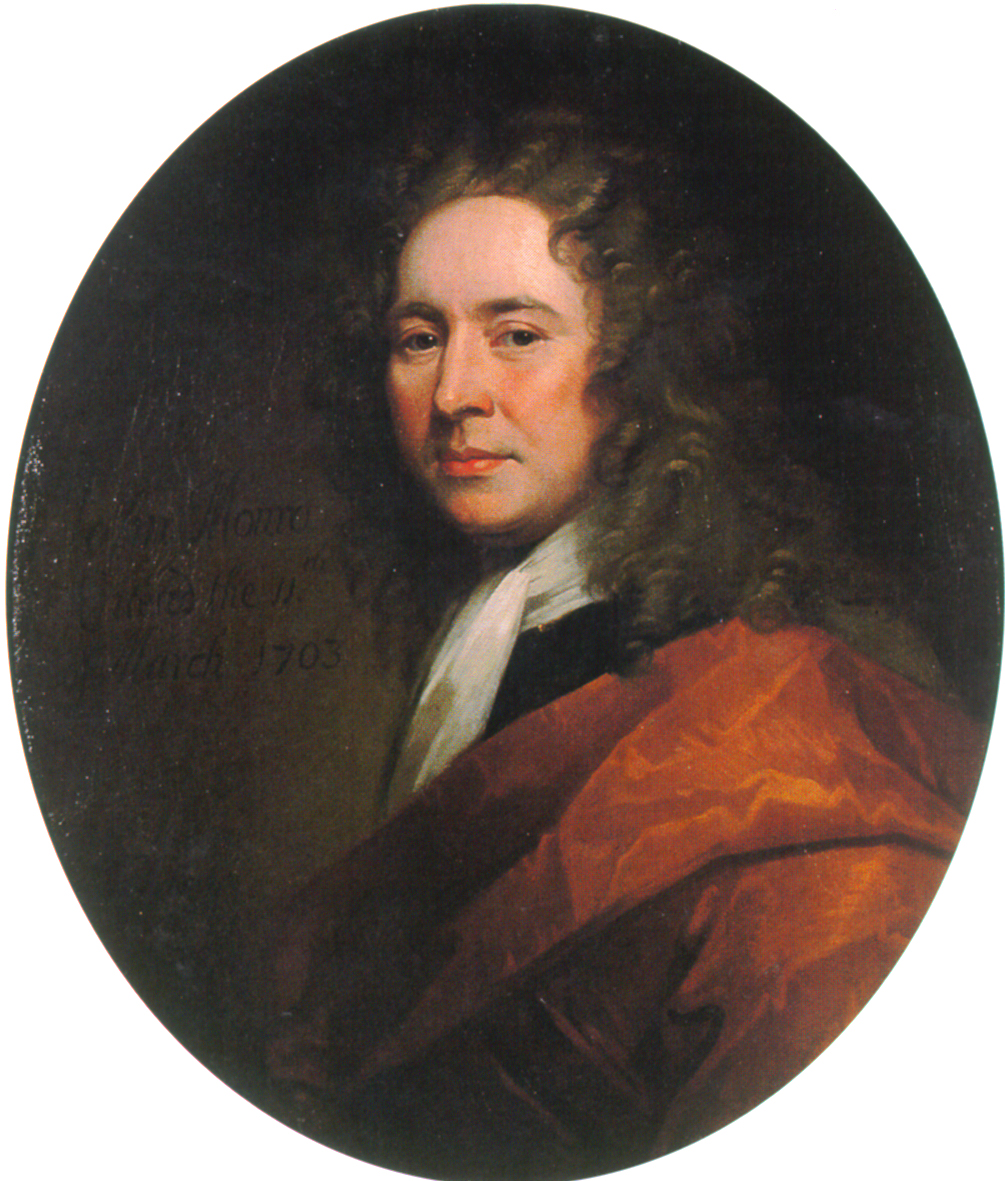
- Portrait of John Monro in 1715 by William Aikman
- Born: 1670; Edinburgh
- Died: 1740 (aged 69–70); Carolside, near Earlston, Berwickshire
- Occupation: Surgeon
- Known for: Role in founding the University of Edinburgh Medical School. Progenitor of the dynasty of Monro anatomists

John Monro of Bearcrofts (1670–1740) was a Scottish surgeon who was the progenitor of the Monro dynasty of anatomists in Edinburgh. He is credited with conceiving and playing a major role in founding the University of Edinburgh Medical School. He served as Deacon (President) of the Incorporation of Surgeons of Edinburgh.

== Medical education ==
John Monro was the third son of Sir Alexander Monro (1629–1704) of Bearcrofts, commissary of Stirling. He was initially apprenticed on 8 April 1687, to the Edinburgh surgeon William Borthwick of Pilmuir (1641–89), the first in the Edinburgh Incorporation of Surgeons to have an international perspective, having studied at Padua, Italy and at Leiden, Holland.

Borthwick's Leiden education and his appointment in 1679 as Chirurgeon Major to the Army in Scotland, both influenced his young apprentice. From 1689, Monro served as an apprentice to Dr Christopher Irvine who had obtained a medical degree abroad. Monro matriculated at the University of Leiden in Holland on 11 October 1692. While studying there he attended the lectures of Archibald Pitcairne from Edinburgh who had been appointed Professor of Physic.

== Military career ==
In 1694, he returned home and married his cousin, Jean Forbes, granddaughter of the first Duncan Forbes of Culloden. On 7 March 1695 he was commissioned Surgeon in General Sir Henry Belasyse's 22nd Regiment of Foot.

During that spring the regiment served in the Netherlands and were in camp between Bruges and Ghent. Later in that year, they took part in the Siege of Namur under the personal command of King William III of Great Britain.

From 1696 to 1700, Monro was stationed in England and in Ireland but he appears to have been given long periods of leave which enabled him to set up a house with his wife in London and it was there that his son, Alexander Monro was born in 1697. In 1700, Monro left the army and settled in Edinburgh.

== Surgical career ==
As a necessary prerequisite to practising surgery, he opened an apothecary's shop then became a burgess of the city on 19 August 1702. He was admitted to the Incorporation of Surgeons on 11 March 1703, having passed the necessary examinations. Monro was elected as Boxmaster (Treasurer) from 1708 to 1710 and was elected Deacon (President) in 1712. This gave him an ex officio seat on Edinburgh Town Council and later that year he was elected Deacon of the Edinburgh Convenery of Trades, a position which gave him considerable local political power and status. The following year he was re-elected to these offices, and in addition, was appointed one of the City’s representatives on the Convention of the Royal Burghs of Scotland. In 1713 the Town Council appointed him surgeon to the poor of the city for an annual salary of '300 merks Scots', a position he held until 1720.

== Political allegiance ==
Monro was loyal to the British monarchy. He was present in his official robes as Deacon of Convenery along with other civic dignitaries at the proclamation of George I as King of Great Britain, France and Ireland at the Mercat Cross in Edinburgh on 5 August 1714. It seems likely that he attended the wounded at the Battle of Sherrifmuir in 1715 during the Jacobite rising.

== Role in establishing the Edinburgh Medical School ==
Having established himself in Edinburgh as a man of influence and authority in professional and civic affairs, John Monro set about the fulfilment of his ambition of founding in the City a "Seminary of Medical Education" modelled on the medical school of the University of Leiden, where he had studied. In 1720, he produced "a plan which he had long formed in my own mind, of having the different branches of Physic and Surgery regularly taught at Edinburgh, which was highly approved by them".

His plan was favourably received by the Town Council, the University of Edinburgh the Royal College of Physicians of Edinburgh and the Incorporation of Surgeons. The key to its success was the appointment to the University Chair of Anatomy of John Monro’s son, Alexander, whose education and training had been planned with this specific objective. Indeed, Alexander arguably had the best medical education available at the time, studying in Edinburgh, London, Paris and Leiden. To facilitate his son's appointment to this key chair, John Monro used his influence in 1720 to force the Incorporation's two Professors of anatomy, John McGill and Adam Drummond to resign in favour of his son. The reason for these resignations was because "...the state of their health and business were such that they could not duly attend the said professorships" and they unanimously recommended Alexander Monro to be Professor of Anbatomy to the city and the University. The following week, on 29 January 1720 Alexander was appointed by the town Council as Professor of Anatomy in the University.

In the following months, John Monro was involved in the arrangement that Charles Alston should become Professor of Materia Medica and that James Crawford should become Professor of Chemistry. These appointments and the lectures that resulted from them are regarded as the origin of the Edinburgh University Medical School, the first university medical school in the English-speaking world. The role played by powerful patrons such as Archibald Campbell, 1st Earl of Ilay (1682– 1761) and Lord Provost George Drummond (1688–1766) in these events, which remains the subject of controversy, has been explored at length by Emerson.

== Family and death ==
John Monro married twice. In 1694, he married his first cousin Jean Forbes, granddaughter of the first Duncan Forbes of Culloden. They had one son Alexander Monro primus (1697–1767). In turn his son, who would become Prof Alexander Monro secundus (1733–1817) also held the chair of Anatomy at the University of Edinburgh as did his son who would become Professor Alexander Monro tertius (1773–1859). Between them, these 3 men occupied the chair of Anatomy for a total of 126 years, from 1720–1846. They were distant relatives of the 'Bedlam Monros', another dynasty, known for their treatment of insanity in London. Jean Monro died c. 1710. In August 1721, John Monro married Margaret Main (née Crichton) and she outlived him. In later years, he lived at Carolside near Earlston in Berwickshire, where he died in 1740.
