= John Inglis (Royal Navy officer) =

Royal Navy officer

Vice-Admiral John Inglis
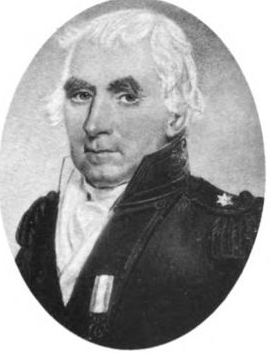
- Inglis in 1805
- Born: 20 March 1743; Philadelphia
- Died: 11 March 1807 (aged 63); Edinburgh
- Military career
- Allegiance: United Kingdom
- Branch: Royal Navy
- Service years: 1758–1807
- Rank: Vice-Admiral
- Commands: HMS Griffin; HMS Zephyr; HMS Squirrel; HMS Coromandel; HMS Belliqueux
- Conflicts: Seven Years' War; American Revolutionary War; French Revolutionary Wars; Battle of Camperdown

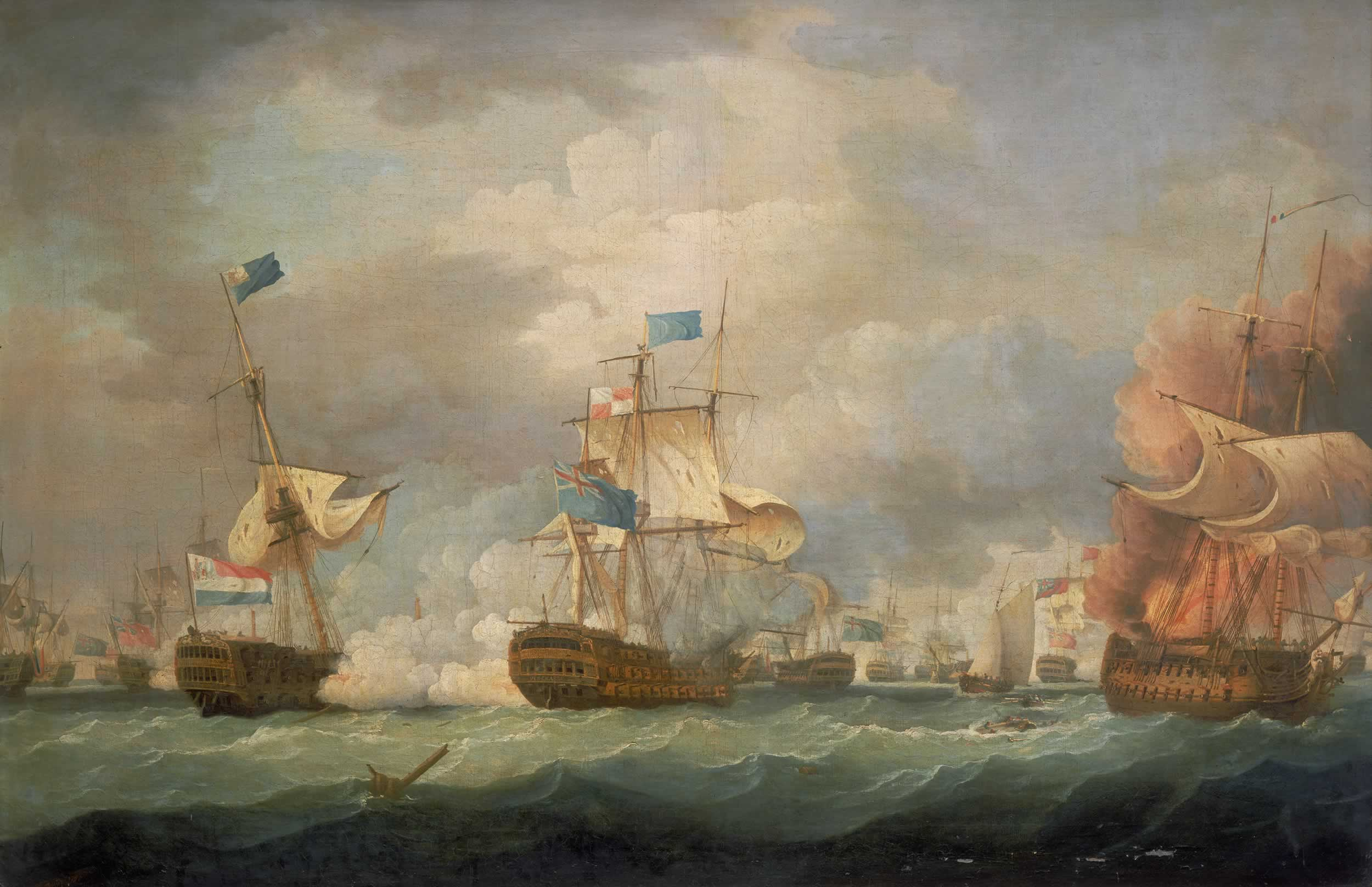
The Battle of Camperdown

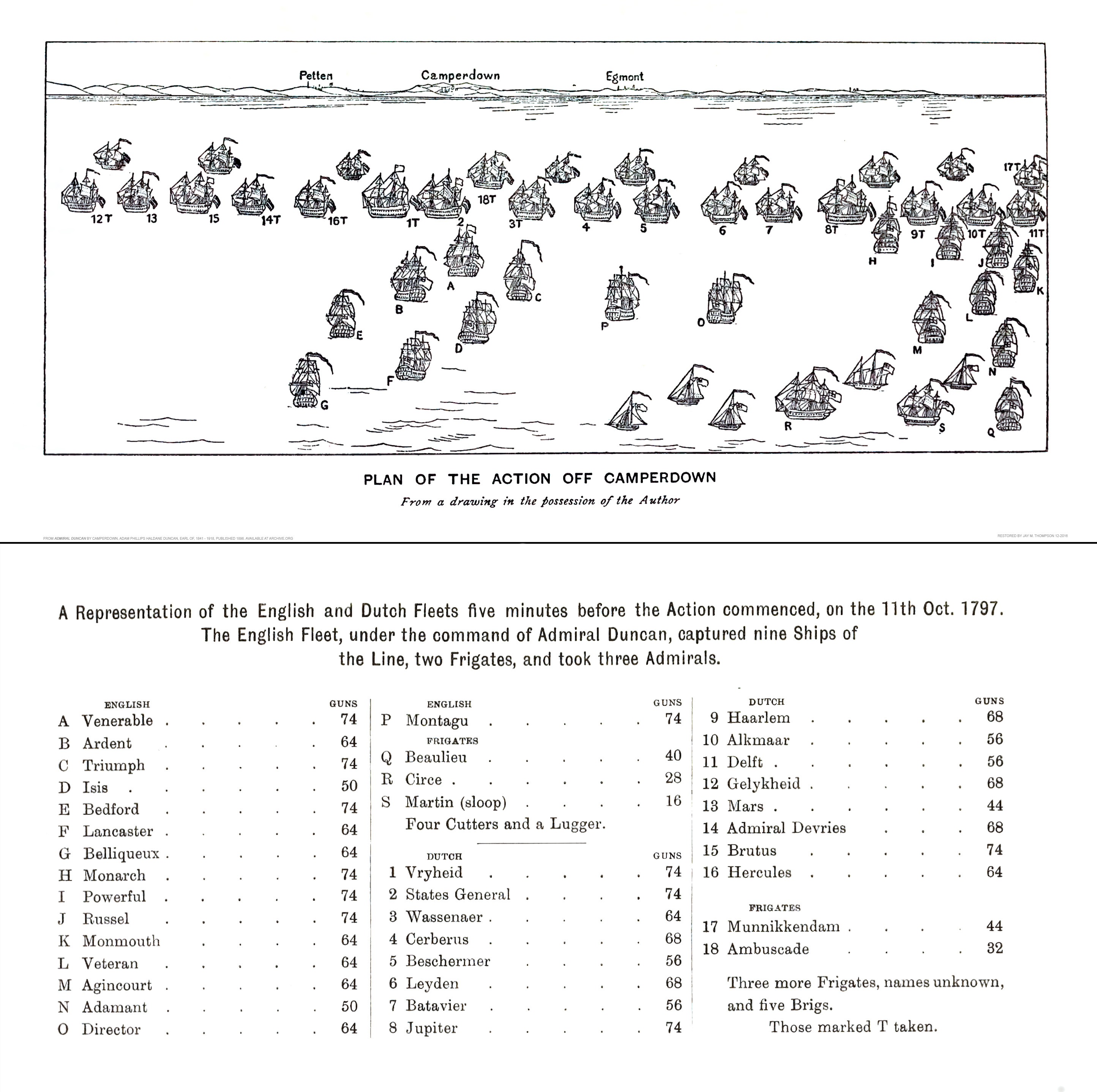
Belliqueux's position in the Battle of Camperdown (g)

Vice-Admiral John Inglis (20 March 1743 – 11 March 1807) was a Royal Navy officer who served at the Battle of Camperdown in 1797.

== Life ==
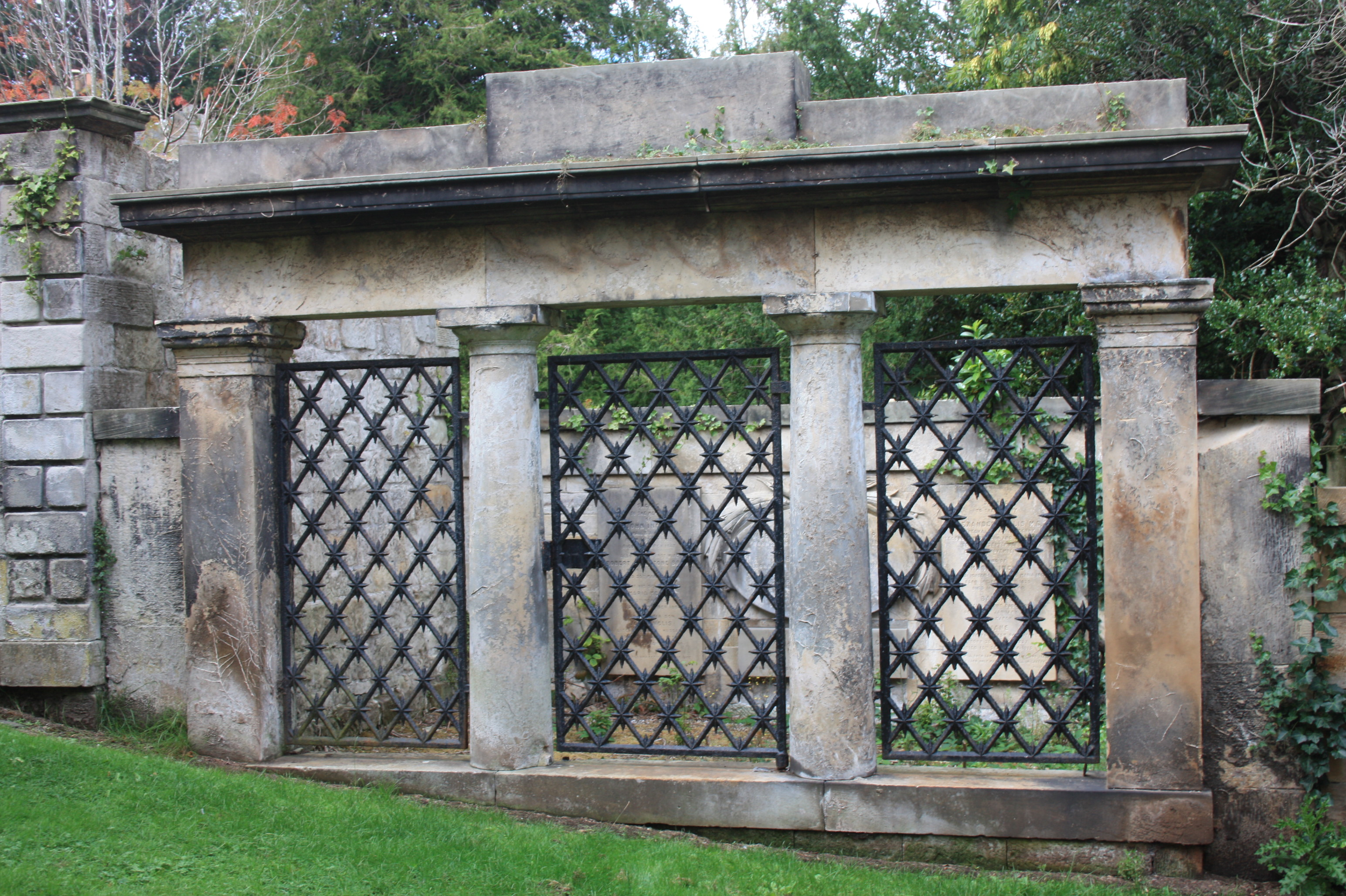
The burial vault of Admiral John Inglis, Colinton churchyard, Edinburgh

Inglis was born on 20 March 1743 in Philadelphia, the eldest son of John Inglis, a Scottish merchant settled in the British Colonies in America, and his wife, Catherine McCall. He was baptized some time in the month of September 1744 at Christ Church, Philadelphia, Pennsylvania.

In 1757, during the Seven Years' War, he joined HMS Garland as a volunteer. He left HMS Garland after less than three months in order to travel to England to join the newly built HMS Hussar under Captain John Elliot. Elliot's brother, Andrew, was married to John's aunt, Eleanor McCall. Elliot later became captain of HMS Aeolus and then HMS Chichester and Inglis remained with him. John was promoted to lieutenant in 1761 while a member of the crew of HMS Chichester and remained with her until just before she was decommissioned in 1764. In 1768 he was given his first command of the newly built HMS Sultana (a small 8-gunner schooner). HMS Sultana operated in American waters from 1768 until 1772 when she returned to England and was sold out of the Navy.

While he did not hold a naval command Inglis obtained the captaincy of the St. George a merchant vessel owned by Willing and Morris which was based in Philadelphia and traded with Britain between 1773 and 1775. He left Philadelphia in 1775 moving to Scotland where he married.

During the American War of Independence, he became 4th Lieutenant of HMS Trident under John Elliot. HMS Trident was selected to carry the Carlisle Commission to America in 1778. Elliot was promoted to Commodore for the voyage and Inglis became captain. On arrival in America Inglis moved to take command of HMS Senegal. Unfortunately his ship was captured by vessels from the French fleet under the Comte d'Estaing during the Rhode Island campaign in August 1778. Having been exonerated at a court martial in New York Inglis returned to Britain and In the spring of 1779 he was given command of the newly built 14-gunner HMS Delight which he sailed to North America in June. Here he captured the US ships Industry (18 February) and Macaroni (16 April). HMS Delight took part in the British Campaign in Virginia and then supported the British army in the Cape Fear River in January 1781. Inglis returned to Britain from Charlestown carrying the despatches from Lord Cornwallis. He never returned to America.

In August 1781 he was promoted to post captain and given HMS Squirrel a 20-gunner from the mid 18th century. HMS Squirrel acted as a convoy escourt in the English Channel and Irish Sea. She captured the French privateers Furet on 15 February 1782 and the 8-gunner Aimable Manon on 21 June 1782. The Squirrel was decommissioned and broken up at the end of the war.

Inglis returned to Scotland when he first lived at Auchendinny House near Penicuik. On the death of his uncle, George Inglis, he inherited Redhall House, Colinton, near Edinburgh (which George had built in 1758).

In 1793 he was one of the jury in the trial of Thomas Muir of Huntershill, one of the most important cases in Scottish legal history. He returned to active service in the navy in 1795. He was then given command a new ship HMS Coromandel a 56-gun vessel originally built for the East India Company and converted for the Navy while under construction. HMS Coromandel lost her masts in a North Sea storm. Inglis and his crew spent several months in a Norwegian anchorage before the vessel was towed back to Britain.

In May 1796 he took command of HMS Belliqueux. This 64-gunner was involved in the mutiny of the North Sea Squadron at Yarmouth with the mutineers moving the vessel to the Nore. On the insistence of Inglis only two of his crew were arrested for mutiny; neither were tried and they were later moved to other vessels..

Belliqueux, was part of the North Sea Squadron at the Battle of Camperdown (11 October 1797) under the overall command of Admiral Adam Duncan. At one point HMS Belliqueux was engaged by two Dutch vessels with one striking their flag. His crew suffered 25 killed and 78 injured, the second highest in the British fleet on that day. Inglis was seriously wounded in the leg by splinters and, after a period in the naval hospitals in Yarmouth and Norwich, returned home to recover from his wounds. In January 1798 he received the freedom of the City of Edinburgh for his actions at Camperdown. Inglis resumed command in October 1798. However, he resigned his command in May 1799 following a dispute with his first Lieutenant. It is probable that he was still suffering from post-traumatic stress. In retirement he was promoted rear admiral (1 January 1801) and vice admiral on 11 March 1807.

He died at Redhall House on 17 March 1807. He is buried in a vault on the north side of Colinton Parish Church.

== Family ==
In January 1777 he married his cousin Barbara Inglis of Auchendinny. They had at least two daughters and three sons.

His eldest son John Inglis (1783–1847) became an advocate in Edinburgh. John married Robert Johnstone Brown (sic) then Maria Monro, daughter of Alexander Monro (tertius). Their son Dr Alexander Inglis (1853–1897) was father to John Alexander Inglis and Charles Inglis

Their second son George Inglis (1788–1849) served as a lieutenant in the Royal Navy. His third son, Archibald, joined the East India Company and reached the rank of Lieutenant Colonel.

His eldest daughter Jane Inglis married the naval hero Cpt James Coutts Crawford. They in turn were parents to Coutts Crawford.

== Family tree ==
John Inglis family tree

George Inglis	John Inglis
Barbara Inglis	Admiral John Inglis	Alexander Monro (tertius)
James Coutts Crawford	Jane Inglis	George Inglis	John Inglis	Maria Monro
Coutts Crawford	Alexander Inglis
John Alexander Inglis

== Artistic recognition ==
He is one of the several commanders illustrated in "Commemoration of 11 October 1797" a widely published engraving in remembrance of the Battle of Camperdown.
