= Alexander Monro III =

Scottish anatomist (1773–1859)

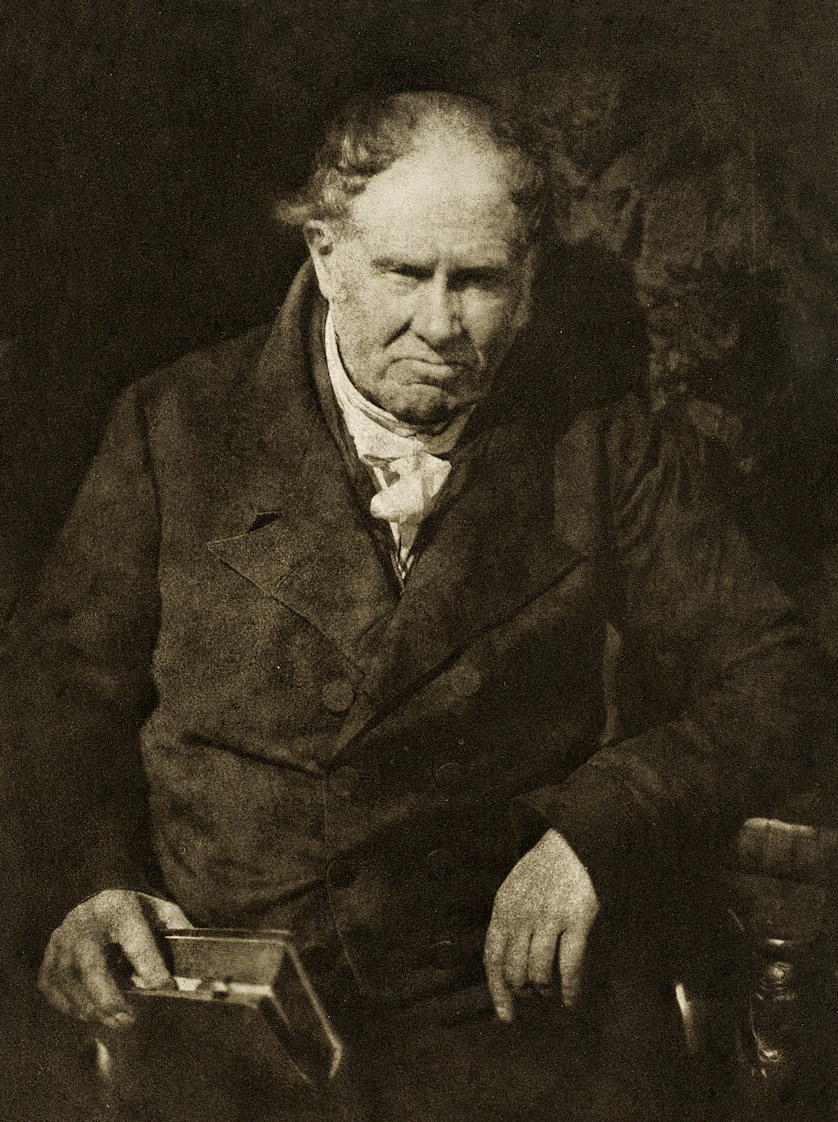
- Alexander Monro in the 1840s
- Born: 5 November 1773; Edinburgh, Scotland
- Died: 10 March 1859 (aged 85); Craiglockhart, Scotland
- Education: University of Edinburgh
- Scientific career
- Fields: medicine, surgery, anatomy

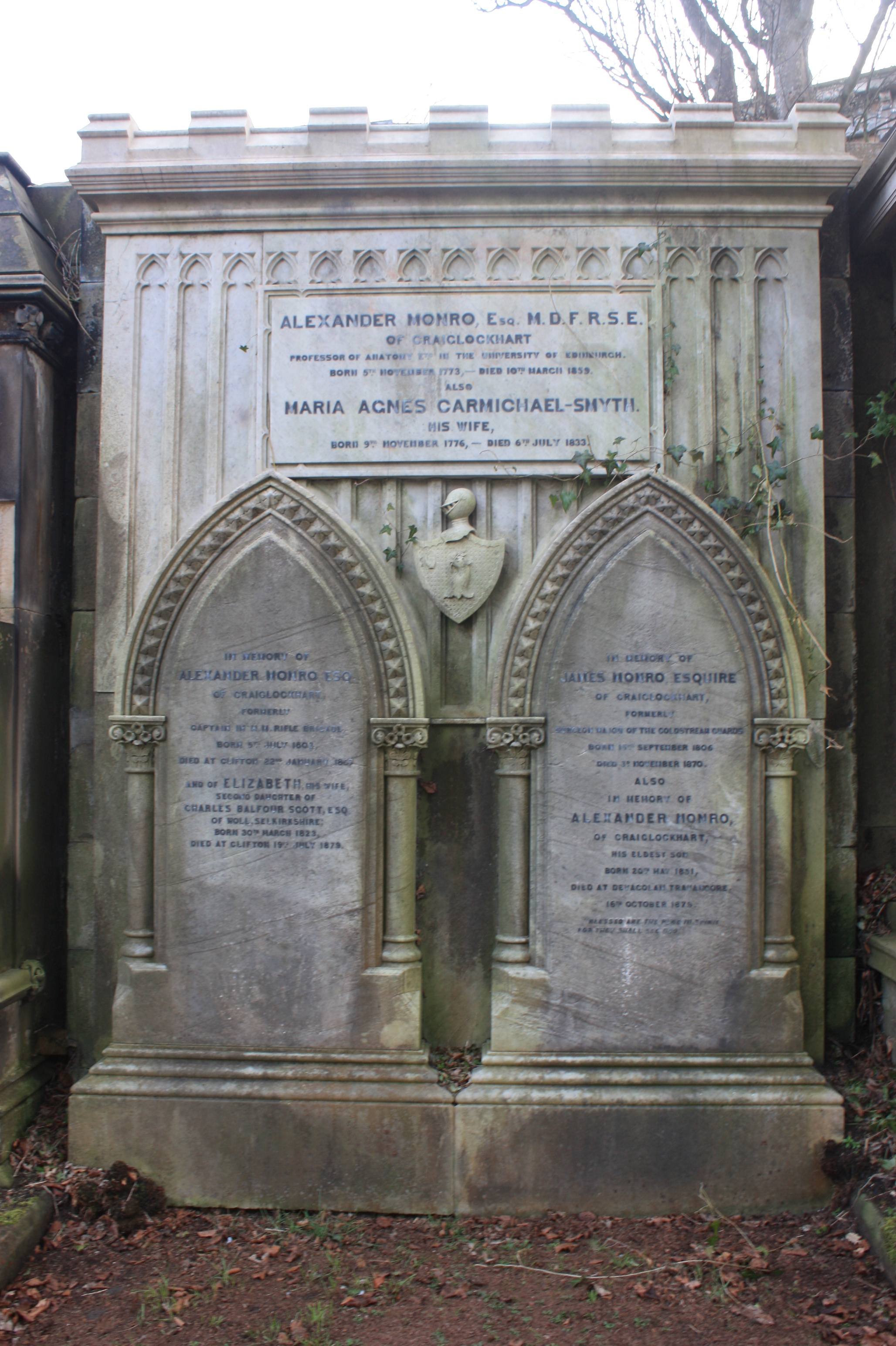
The grave of Alexander Monro III, Dean Cemetery

Alexander Monro III of Craiglockhart, FRSE FRCPE FSA (Scot) MWS (5 November 1773 – 10 March 1859), was a Scottish anatomist and medical educator at the University of Edinburgh Medical School. According to his detractors, Monro was an uninspired anatomist who did not compare with his brilliant father or grandfather as a teacher or scientist. His students included Charles Darwin who asserted that Monro "made his lectures on human anatomy as dull as he was himself."

== Life ==
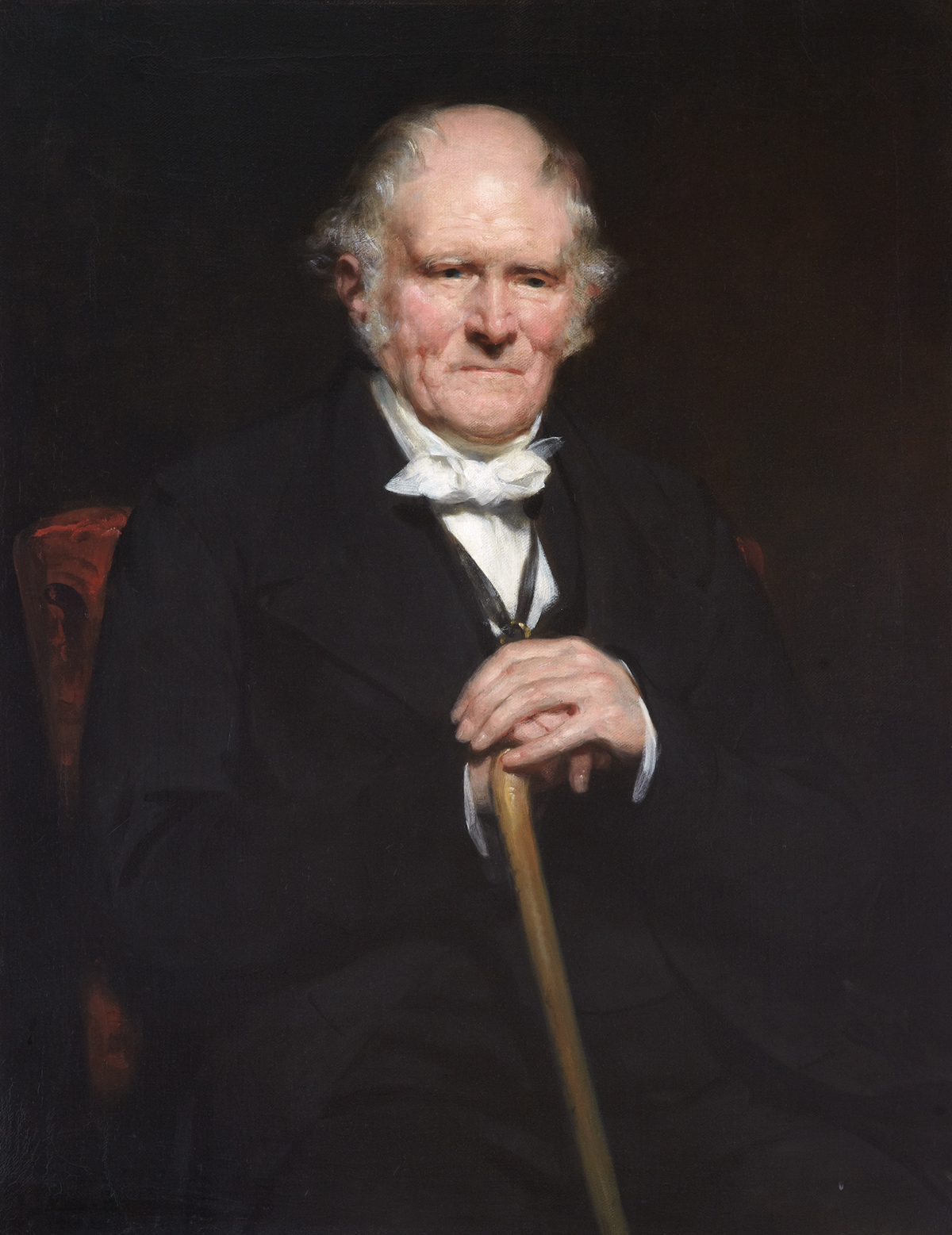
Alexander Monro by John Watson Gordon

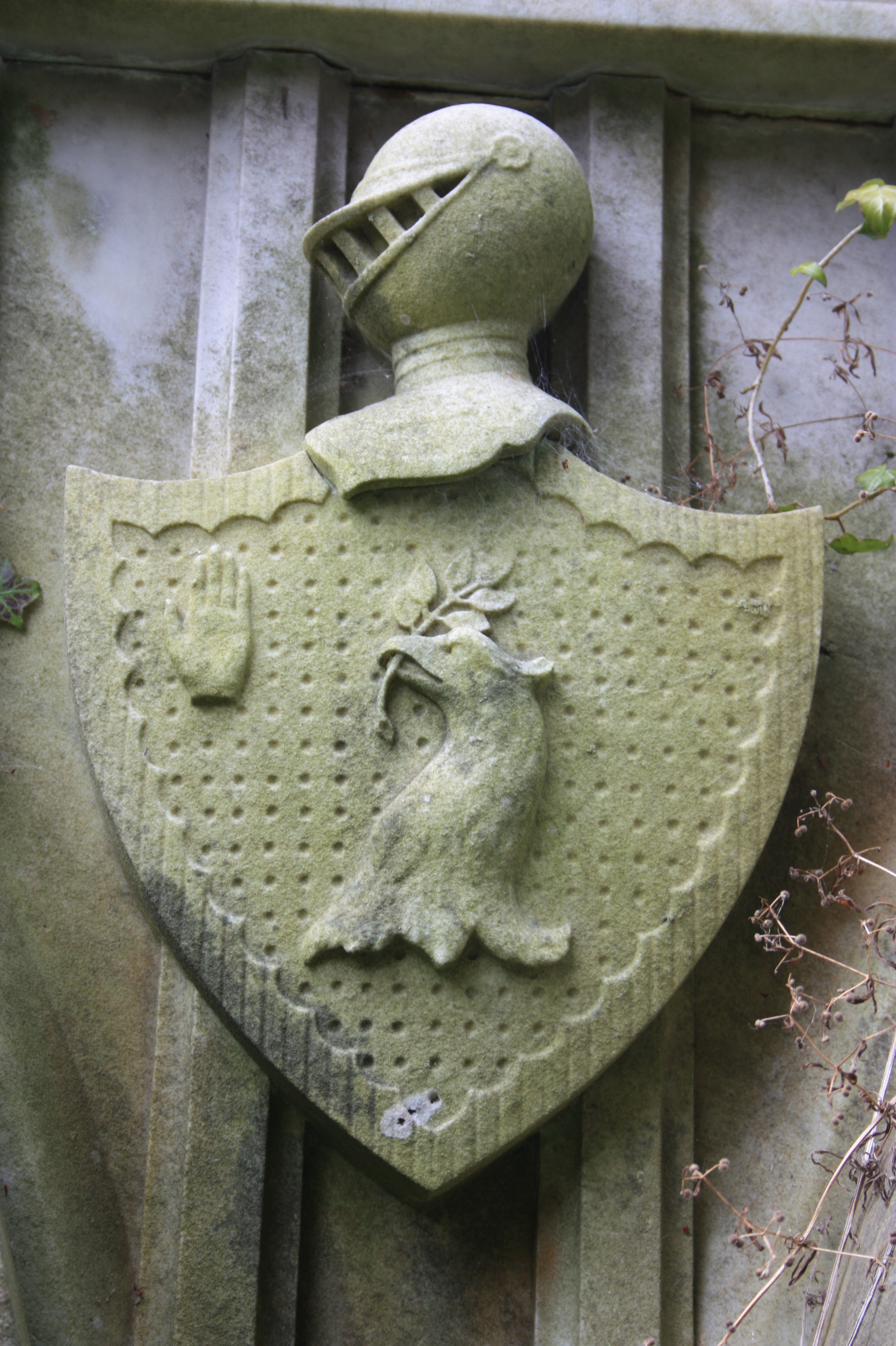
The coat of arms of Alexander Monro, Dean Cemetery

Born at Nicolson Street in Edinburgh on 5 November 1773, he was the son of Alexander Monro (distinguished as "Secundus") and grandson of Alexander Monro (distinguished as "Primus") who had both preceded him in the Chair of Anatomy at the University of Edinburgh. He was educated at the High School of Edinburgh, close to his home, then studied medicine at the University of Edinburgh receiving his doctorate (MD) in September 1797. On 5 November that year he became a Licentiate of the Royal College of Physicians of Edinburgh and 25 days later became a Fellow of the College. He then briefly studied in London under the Scottish born anatomist James Wilson, and then in Paris, returning to Edinburgh in 1799. During his absence he had been appointed conjoint Professor of Anatomy and Surgery with his father and in the academic year 1799/1800 he joined his father in delivering the anatomy lecture course at the University of Edinburgh.

He was elected a Fellow of the Royal Society of Edinburgh in 1798, his proposers being Andrew Duncan, John Hill and Thomas Charles Hope.

In the early 19th century the University of Edinburgh was regarded as the best medical school in the United Kingdom despite the fact that its reputation had declined from its heyday in the Enlightenment of the 18th century. The University had been founded as the Town's College and was still governed by the Town Council. Two thirds of the professors were appointed by the Tory-controlled Council on the basis of their party list subject to approval by the Kirk, with little regard for ability. In some cases families treated the university chairs as hereditary, and critics alleged that Alexander Monro III exemplified the "mediocrity" this could produce. His manner was described as "unimpassioned indifference" and lectures were known to degenerate into riots.

Monro took little pride in his personal appearance and was described by contemporaries as dishevelled, scruffy and even dirty. This was an era when many in medicine considered cleanliness to be finicking and affected. "An executioner might as well manicure his nails before chopping off a head." For this reason, Charles Darwin, a student at the University of Edinburgh in 1825, was disgusted by Monro arriving at lectures still bloody from the dissecting room. Darwin wrote to his family that "I dislike [Monro] and his lectures so much that I cannot speak with decency about them. He is so dirty in person and actions." Many students turned to competing private schools in Surgeon's Square instead, with Charles' brother Erasmus going to John Lizars, but Charles found the sight of surgery so upsetting that he stopped trying and turned his attention to natural history.

During Monro's tenure as Professor of Anatomy, Edinburgh was rocked by scandal due to the notorious "Burke and Hare murders" in which healthy individuals were intentionally killed in order to supply cadavers for dissection by anatomy lecturers and their students. One of the murderers, William Burke, was hanged on 28 January 1829, after which he was famously dissected at the Edinburgh Medical College by Monro. In a letter, Monro dipped his quill pen into Burke's blood and wrote, "This is written with the blood of Wm Burke, who was hanged at Edinburgh. This blood was taken from his head."

Alexander Monro III resigned as the Chair of Anatomy in 1846 and thus ended the dynastic reign of Monros at Edinburgh University which had spanned 126 years. Among Monro's publications are "Outlines of the Anatomy of the Human Body" (1811) in four volumes and "Elements of Anatomy" (1825) in two volumes. Although he taught surgery, Monro had never trained nor practised as a surgeon. He was Secretary of the Royal College of Physicians of Edinburgh from 1809 to 1819 and elected President in 1825 and 1826. He was also on the Council of Wernerian Natural History Society of which he became a member in 1811.

In 1841 Dr Robert Halliday Gunning came to Edinburgh to oversee Monro's anatomy rooms and work as his assistant.

Monro died at Craiglockhart House, south-west of Edinburgh on 10 March 1859 and is buried in Lord's Row against the western wall of Dean Cemetery.

== Notable students ==
Teaching in the heyday of Edinburgh's medical prominence his pupils included several eminent physicians:

- William Alison
- Robert Christison
- John Elliotson
- Robert Liston
- James Syme
- Thomas Stewart Traill

== Publications ==
- Crural Hernia
- Modified Smallpox
- Morbid Anatomy of the Gullet, Stomach and Intestines
- Morbid Anatomy of the Brain
- Elements of Anatomy

== Family ==
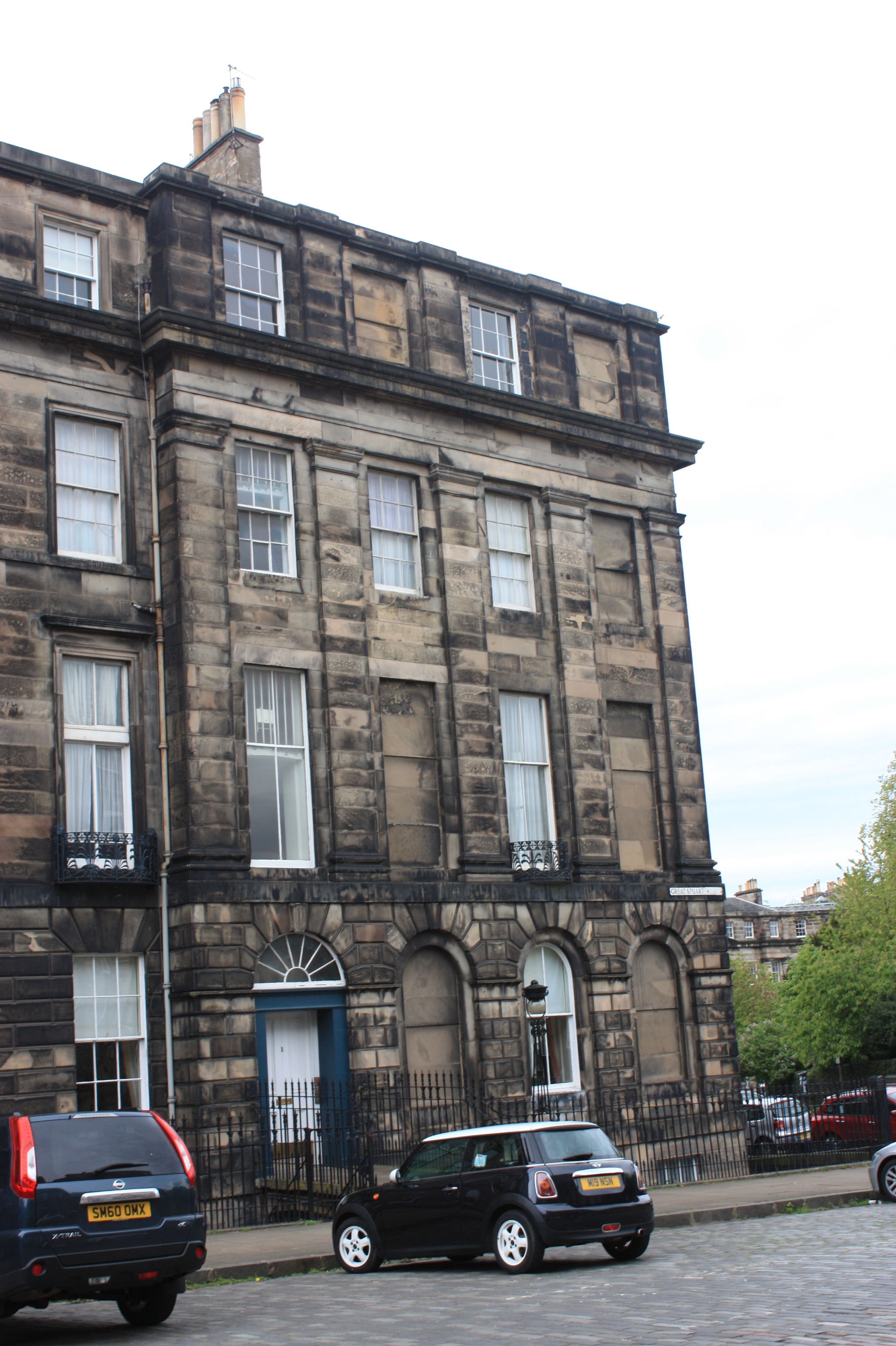
1 Great Stuart Street, Edinburgh

Monro is also known as Alexander Monro Tertius because his two predecessors as professor of anatomy at the University of Edinburgh had the same name: these were his grandfather Alexander Monro Primus and his father Alexander Monro Secundus. Alexander's great-grandfather John Munro had been an Edinburgh surgeon who played a leading role in the founding of the Edinburgh Medical School. His uncle was Dr Donald Monro FRSE who became a military physician in London.

Monro Tertius married twice: firstly, in 1800, to Maria Agnes Carmichael-Smyth (1776–1833), the daughter of Dr Carmichael-Smyth, together they had 12 children; and secondly, in 1836, to Jessie Hunter. The latter survived him.

In the 1830s he was living, with his large family and first wife, at 1 Great Stuart Street on the Moray Estate in Edinburgh's west end. The house stands on a prominent corner partly facing the gardens of Moray Place. Monro's neighbour (at 3 Great Stuart Street) was Dr Robert Christison.

His son Sir David Monro made a career as a politician in New Zealand, and was the second Speaker of the New Zealand House of Representatives.

His daughter, Maria Monro, married John Inglis, advocate (1783–1847) son of Admiral John Inglis. Their grandchildren included John Alexander Inglis.

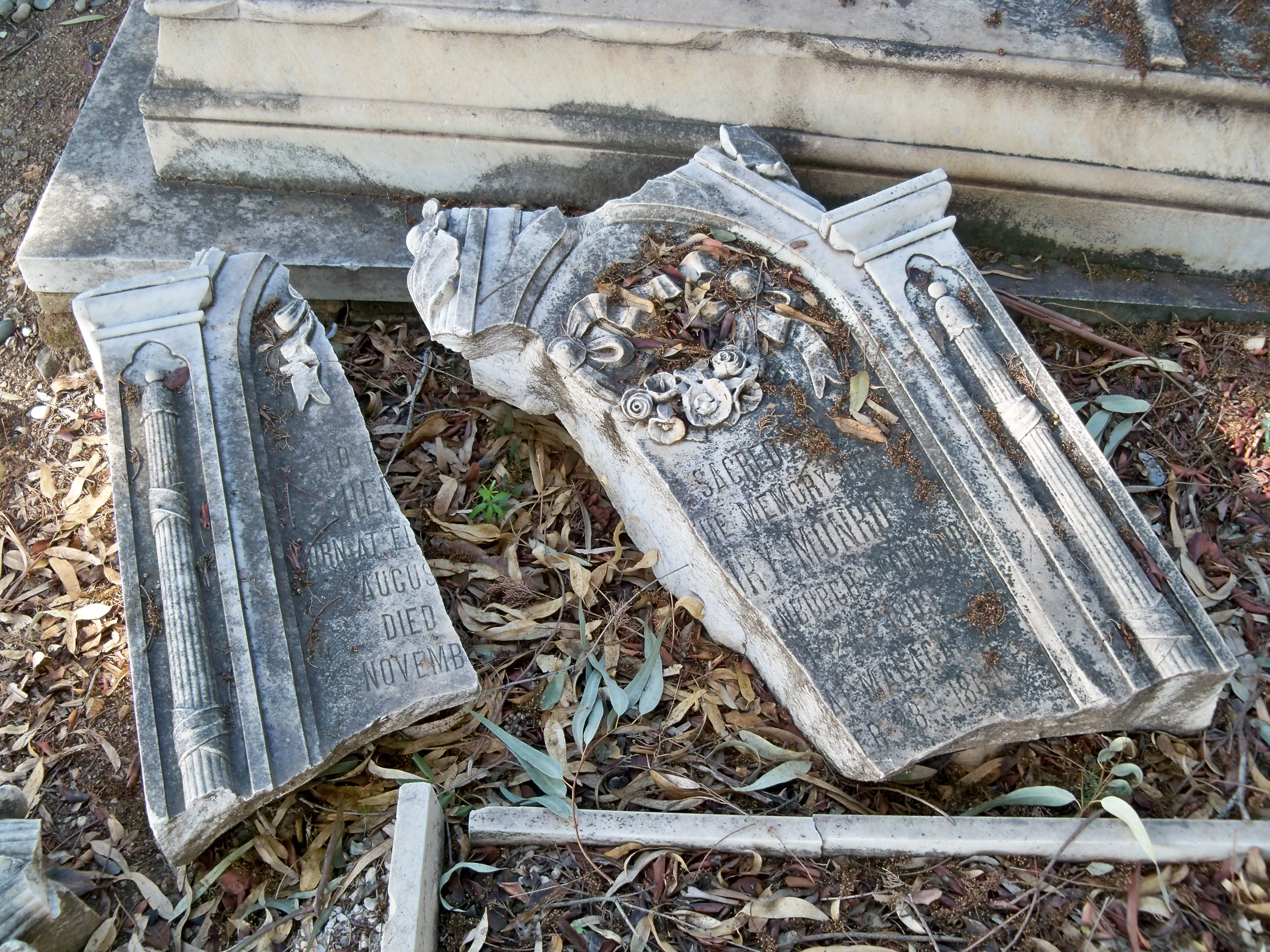
Headstone of Henry Monro, son of Alexander Monro Tertius, in Málaga

His son Alexander Monro was a Captain in the Rifle Brigade; James Monro was assistant surgeon on the Scots Greys; Henry Monro was a colonist in the Port Phillip District of Australia where he was involved in the Waterloo Plains massacre of Indigenous Australians, later moving to Málaga, Spain, where he died; William Monro was a lieutenant in the 79th Highlanders. His third daughter married George Skene, son of James Skene of Rubislaw.

== In popular culture ==
In the 2010 motion picture Burke and Hare, Monro is a bitter rival of Dr Robert Knox (Tom Wilkinson) whom he thwarts at every turn by having a statute passed ensuring all dead bodies be passed on to him for dissection. He also has an unhealthy obsession with feet. Monro is portrayed by Tim Curry.

== See also ==
- Alexander Monro Primus, 1698–1767
- Alexander Monro Secundus, 1733–1817
