= HMS Coromandel (1795) =

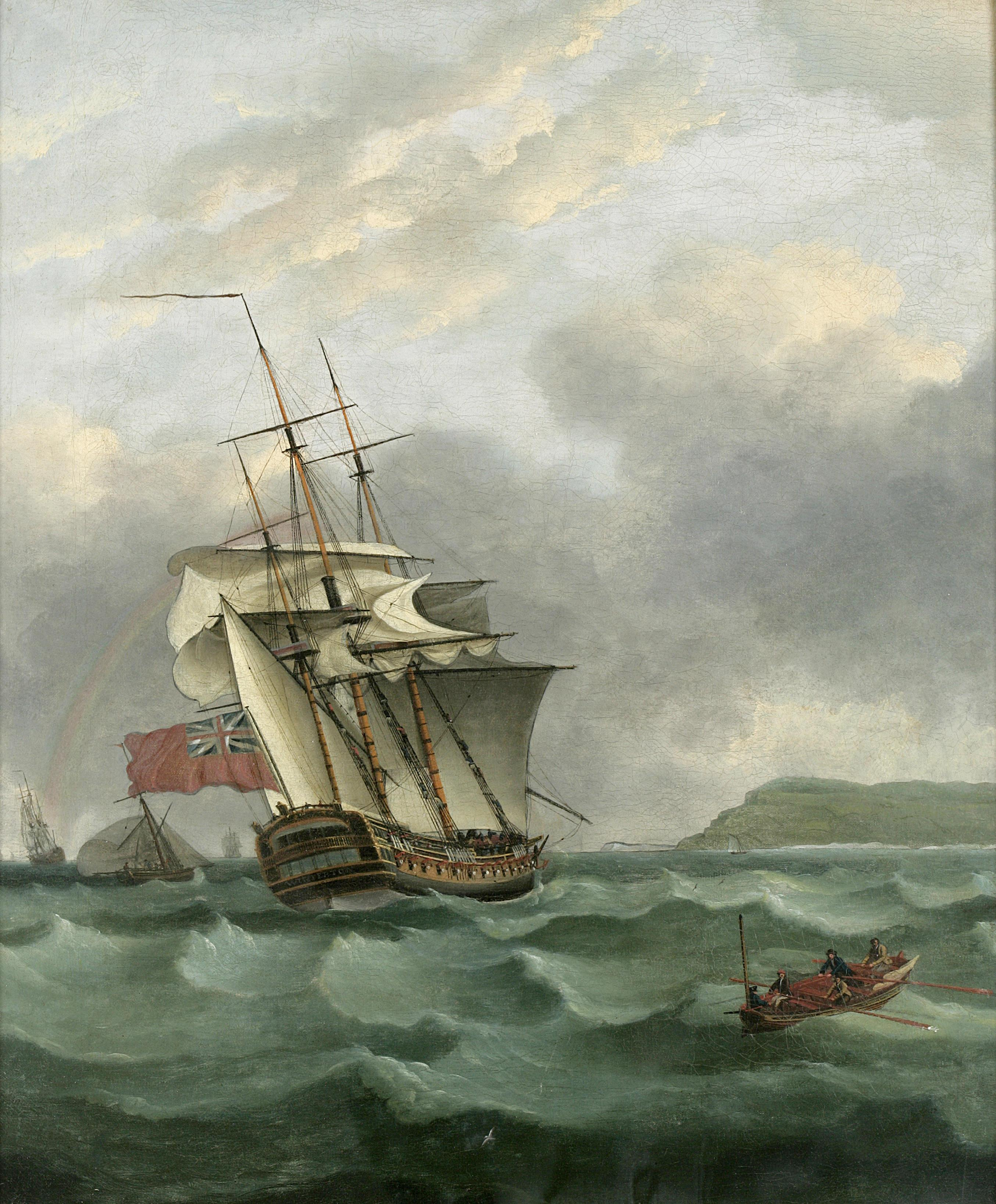
- Approaching Dover, by Thomas Whitcombe

History

East India Company
- Name: Winterton
- Builder: Perry & Co., Blackwall Yard
- Launched: 9 May 1795
- Fate: Sold to the Royal Navy in 1795

Great Britain
- Name: HMS Coromandel
- Acquired: 1795 by purchase
- Commissioned: June 1795
- Fate: Sold 1813 for breaking up

General characteristics
- Class & type: Fourth rate in Royal Navy service
- Tons burthen: 1290, or 133441/94 (bm)
- Length: 169 ft 0 in (51.51 m) (overall); 139 ft 3 3/8 in (42.453 m) (keel)
- Beam: 42 ft 5 1/4 in (12.935 m)
- Depth of hold: 17 ft 2 in (5.23 m)
- Sail plan: Full-rigged ship
- Complement: 4th Rate: 324; Transport:100
- Armament: 4th Rate: Lower deck: 28 × 18-pounder guns; Upper deck: 28 × 32-pounder carronades; Transport: 24 × 18 & 9-pounder guns

HMS Coromandel was a 56-gun fourth rate of the Royal Navy, previously the East Indiaman Winterton. She was purchased on the stocks in 1795, used as a troopship from 1796, was converted to a convalescent ship in 1807 for Jamaica, and was sold there in 1813.

== Military career ==
The Royal Navy purchased Winterton on the stocks, and commissioned her as HMS Coromandel in June 1795 under Captain John Inglis. The Admiralty must have been dissatisfied with her as they transferred her to the Transport Board in May 1796 and paid her off in July. Coromandel was recommissioned later that month as a troopship under the command of Lieutenant Richard Harrison. He received a letter of marque dated 15 July 1796. The Navy then struck Coromandel off the Navy List on 9 August.

Richard (or Robert) Simmonds replaced Harrison in 1797. Richard Simmonds received a letter of marque dated 17 November 1797. A year later, on 7 November 1798, Coromandel was at the capture of Minorca. Her officers and crew therefore participated in their share of a partial payment of £20,000 for goods and stores captured at that time. Another payment followed later. Eight days after the fall of Minorca, on 15 November, Coromandel captured the Spanish ship Misericordia, of Minorca, which was carrying a cargo of paper. As part of the British fleet, Coromandel shared in the prize money for the recapture of HMS Peterel on 13 November.

Commander John Mortimer replaced Simmonds in July 1799, in the West Indies. He remained in command until some point in 1801. Between 15 March 1801 and 7 April, Coromandel participated in the capture of the islands of St Bartholomew, Saint Martin, St Thomas, and St. Croix as part of the expedition under Lieutenant General Thomas Trigge and Admiral John Duckworth. On 4 January 1802 she ran ashore in Jamaica, but was got off and on 18 January she sailed for Martinique.

Coromandel was back in Britain by August 1802, being fitted at Chatham for service as a troopship. She then spent the period June through October 1807 being fitted at Chatham as a convalescent ship for service in Jamaica.

== Fate ==
Coromandel was sold at Jamaica on 24 July 1813 to Mr. William Barnes for £700. She was sold on condition that she be broken up.
