= André Wendt =

German politician (born 1971)

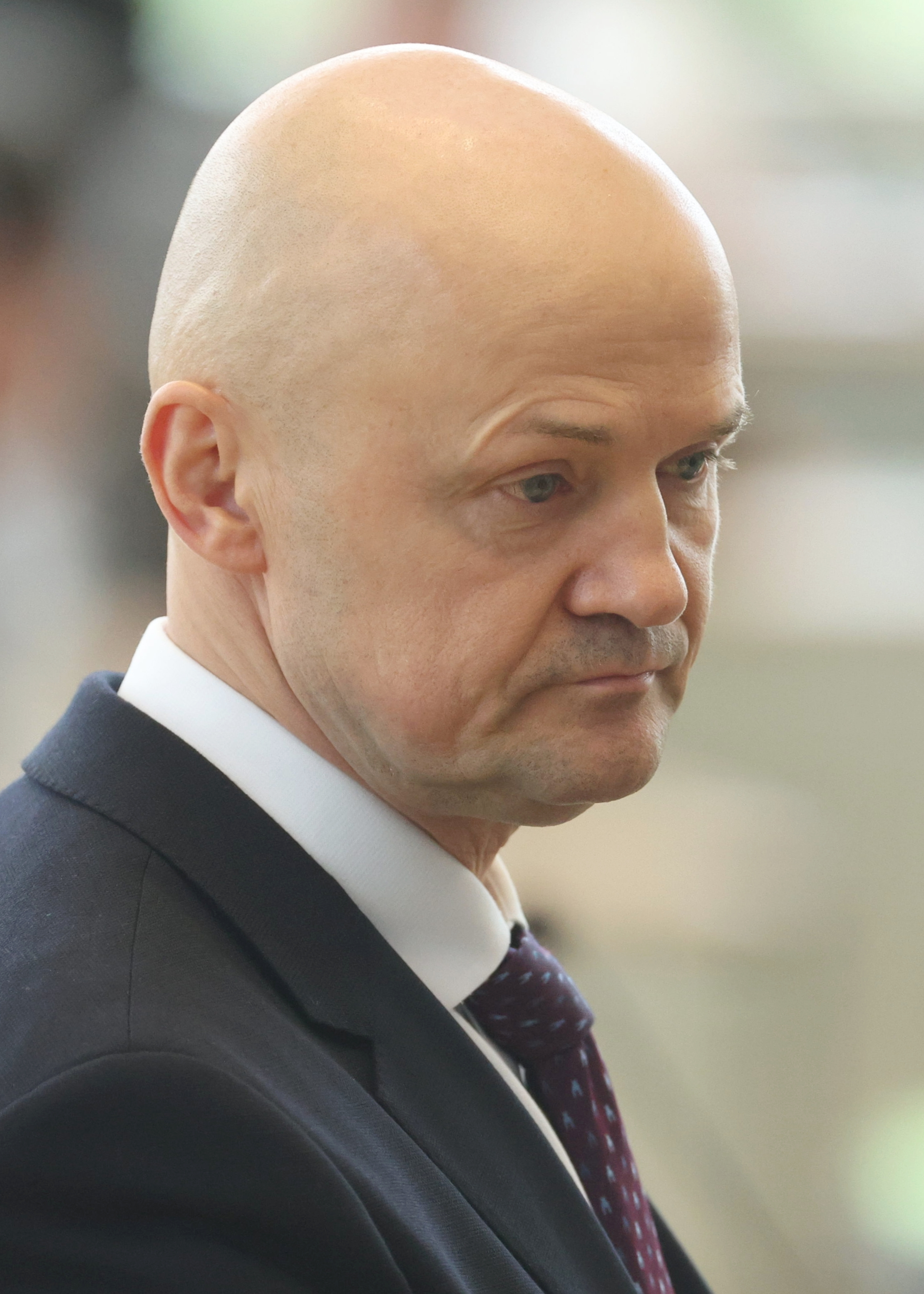
- Wendt in 2024

Member of the Landtag of Saxony
- Incumbent
- Assumed office 29 September 2014

Personal details
- Born: 28 September 1971 (age 54) Großenhain
- Party: Alternative for Germany (since 2013)

André Wendt (born 28 September 1971 in Großenhain) is a German politician serving as a member of the Landtag of Saxony since 2014. He has served as second vice president of the Landtag since 2019.
