= Meißen 2 =

State electoral district of Germany

37: Meißen 2
- Electoral district for the Landtag of Saxony
- Meißen 2 in 2024
- District: Meissen
- Electorate: 48,153 (2024)
- Major settlements: Gröditz, Großenhain, and Radeburg

Current electoral district
- Party: AfD
- Member: Mario Beger

Meißen 2 is an electoral constituency (German: Wahlkreis) represented in the Landtag of Saxony. It elects one member via first-past-the-post voting. Under the constituency numbering system, it is designated as constituency 37. It is within the district of Meissen.

== Geography ==
The constituency comprises the towns of Gröditz, Großenhain, and Radeburg, and the municipalities of Ebersbach, Glaubitz, Lampertswalde, Nünchritz, Priestewitz, Röderaue, Schönfeld, Thiendorf, and Wülknitz within the district of Meissen.

There were 48,153 eligible voters in 2024.

== Members ==
Election	Member	Party	%
2014	Sebastian Fischer	CDU	41.4
2019	Mario Beger	AfD	40.1
2024	Mario Beger	AfD	47.5

== Election results ==
=== 2024 election ===
State election (2024): Meißen 2
Notes:	Blue background denotes the winner of the electorate vote. Pink background denotes a candidate elected from their party list. Yellow background denotes an electorate win by a list member, or other incumbent. A ✓ or ✗ denotes status of any incumbent, win or lose respectively.						
Party	Candidate	Votes	%	±%	Party votes	%	±%
AfD	✓ Mario Beger	16,948	47.5	▲7.4	14,671	40.8	▲2.8
CDU	Sebastian Fischer	11,354	31.9	▼0.4	11,353	31.6	▲0.6
BSW					3,867	10.8	
FW	Lucas Partuscheck	2,456	6.9	▲1.6	805	2.2	▼1.0
SPD	Anja Lux	2,101	5.9	▼0.4	1,687	4.7	▼1.5
Freie Sachsen					866	2.4	
Left	Ulrich Köhler	1,432	4.0	▼4.5	770	2.1	▼5.5
FDP	Sven Seurig	842	2.4	▼1.2	282	0.8	▼3.8
Greens	Thomas Berndt	510	1.4	▼2.6	561	1.6	▼2.3
APT					357	1.0	
PARTEI					221	0.6	▼0.4
BD					113	0.3	
Values					99	0.3	
dieBasis					88	0.2	
Pirates					82	0.2	
Bündnis C					48	0.1	
V-Partei3					40	0.1	
BüSo					22	0.1	
ÖDP					17	0	
Informal votes		676			370		
Total valid votes		35,643			35,949		
Turnout		36,319	75.4	▲6.4			
AfD hold	Majority	5,594	15.6				

=== 2019 election ===
State election (2019): Meißen 2
Notes:	Blue background denotes the winner of the electorate vote. Pink background denotes a candidate elected from their party list. Yellow background denotes an electorate win by a list member, or other incumbent. A ✓ or ✗ denotes status of any incumbent, win or lose respectively.						
Party	Candidate	Votes	%	±%	Party votes	%	±%
AfD	Mario Beger	13,465	40.1	▲28.0	12,801	38.0	▲25.7
CDU	✗ Sebastian Fischer	10,821	32.2	▼9.2	10,418	30.9	▼11.1
Left	Erik Richter	2,848	8.5	▼11.7	2,558	7.6	▼8.6
SPD	Katja Schittko	2,117	6.3	▼3.7	2,069	6.1	▼4.8
FW	André Langerfeld	1,761	5.2	▲3.7	1,077	3.2	▲2.0
Greens	Thomas Berndt	1,362	4.1	▲1.3	1,310	3.9	▲1.2
FDP	Berthold Pursche	1,192	3.6	▲0.3	1,530	4.5	▲0.6
APT					502	1.5	▲0.4
PARTEI					334	1.0	▲0.6
NPD					311	0.9	▼6.2
Verjüngungsforschung					276	0.8	
The Blue Party					146	0.4	
Pirates					91	0.3	▼0.7
Awakening of German Patriots - Central Germany					57	0.2	
ÖDP					54	0.2	
PDV					41	0.1	
Humanists					36	0.1	
BüSo					33	0.1	▼0.3
DKP					25	0.1	
Informal votes		570			467		
Total valid votes		33,566			33,669		
Turnout		34,136	68.5	▲15.4			
AfD gain from CDU	Majority	2,644	7.9				

=== 2014 election ===
State election (2014): Meißen 2
Notes:	Blue background denotes the winner of the electorate vote. Pink background denotes a candidate elected from their party list. Yellow background denotes an electorate win by a list member, or other incumbent. A ✓ or ✗ denotes status of any incumbent, win or lose respectively.						
Party	Candidate	Votes	%	±%	Party votes	%	±%
CDU	Sebastian Fischer	11,194	41.4		11,383	42.0	
Left		5,454	20.2		4,396	16.2	
AfD		3,273	12.1		3,337	12.3	
SPD		2,696	10.0		2,950	10.9	
NPD		1,772	6.6		1,926	7.1	
FDP		893	3.3		1,069	3.9	
Greens		761	2.8		744	2.7	
FW		410	1.5		337	1.2	
APT					290	1.1	
Pirates		371	1.4		261	1.0	
DSU					144	0.5	
PARTEI					101	0.4	
BüSo		200	0.7		100	0.4	
Pro Germany Citizens' Movement					66	0.2	
Informal votes		604			524		
Total valid votes		27,024			27,104		
Turnout		27,628	53.1	▼0.6			
CDU win new seat	Majority	5,740	21.2				

== See also ==
- Politics of Saxony
- Landtag of Saxony
