= Großenhain =

Town in Saxony, Germany

- Town
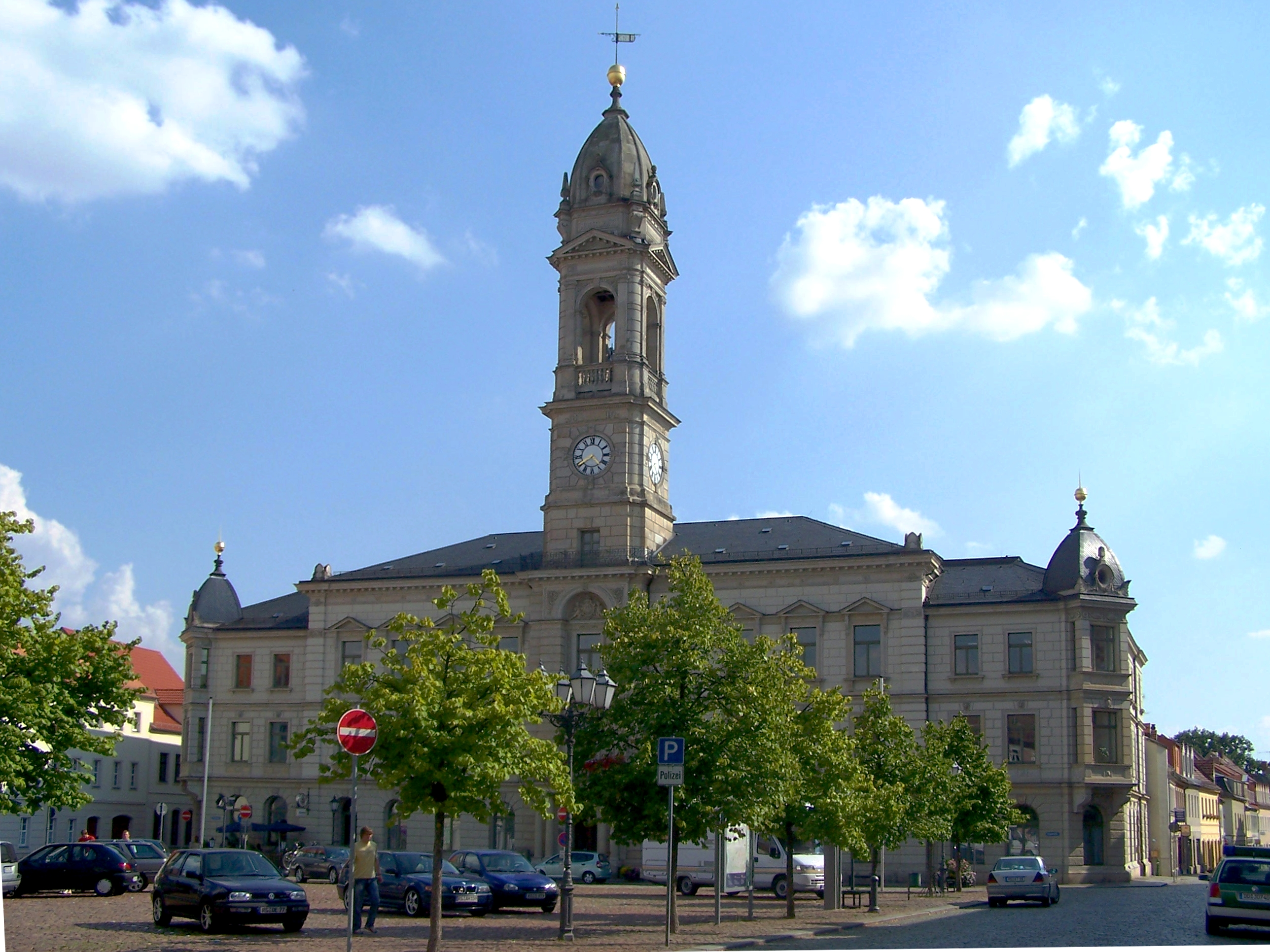
- Town hall

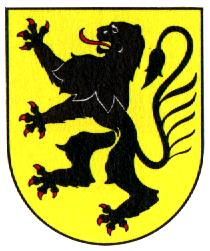
- Coat of arms

- Location of Großenhain within Meissen district
- Interactive map of Großenhain
- Location within Germany Location within Saxony
- Coordinates: 51°17′N 13°33′E
- Country: Germany
- State: Saxony
- District: Meissen
- Subdivisions: 5

Government
  - Mayor (2022–29): Sven Mißbach (Ind.)

Area
  - Total: 130.36 km^{2} (50.33 sq mi)
- Elevation: 122 m (400 ft)

Population (2025-12-31)
  - Total: 17,974
  - Density: 137.88/km^{2} (357.11/sq mi)
- Time zone: UTC+01:00 (CET)
  - Summer (DST): UTC+02:00 (CEST)
- Postal codes: 01558; 01561
- Dialling codes: 03522
- Vehicle registration: MEI; GRH; RG; RIE
- Website: www.grossenhain.de

Großenhain (German pronunciation: [ˈɡʁoːsn̩ˌhaɪn]; also written as Grossenhain; Upper Sorbian: Wulki Hojn, pronounced [ˈwulkʲi ˈhɔjn]) is a Große Kreisstadt (German for major district town) in the district of Meissen, Saxony, Germany. It was originally known as Hayne. The current name simply means "big Hayne".

== History ==
Großenhain was originally a Sorbian settlement, and remains an area where this language is spoken.

It was first mentioned in 1205. It was for a time occupied by the Bohemians, by whom it was strongly fortified. It afterwards came into the possession of the margraves of Meissen, from whom it was taken in 1312 by the margraves of Brandenburg. In the middle-ages, Großenhain was one of the most powerful towns in Saxony.

It suffered considerably in all the great German wars, and in 1744 was nearly destroyed by fire. The fire destroyed the church which was then replaced by the current Marienkirche, which echoes internally echoes the Frauenkirche in nearby Dresden.

On 16 May 1813 a battle took place here between the French (Napoleon's army) and the Russians.

A military airfield was created near the town, opening in February 1914. From 1945 to 1993, this served as an air base of the Soviet Air Force, complete with a secret facility storing nuclear weapons.

Kulturzentrum Grossenhain (the culture centre) was recently created, cleverly converting the ruined fragments of Schloss Grossenhain into a modern building.

On 24 May 2010 Großenhain was hit by a rain-wrapped F3 tornado which killed 1 and injured 40 others. This event made sirens sound for 60 seconds in and around Großenhain. The fatality was a 6-year-old girl who was killed by a falling tree.

== Geography ==
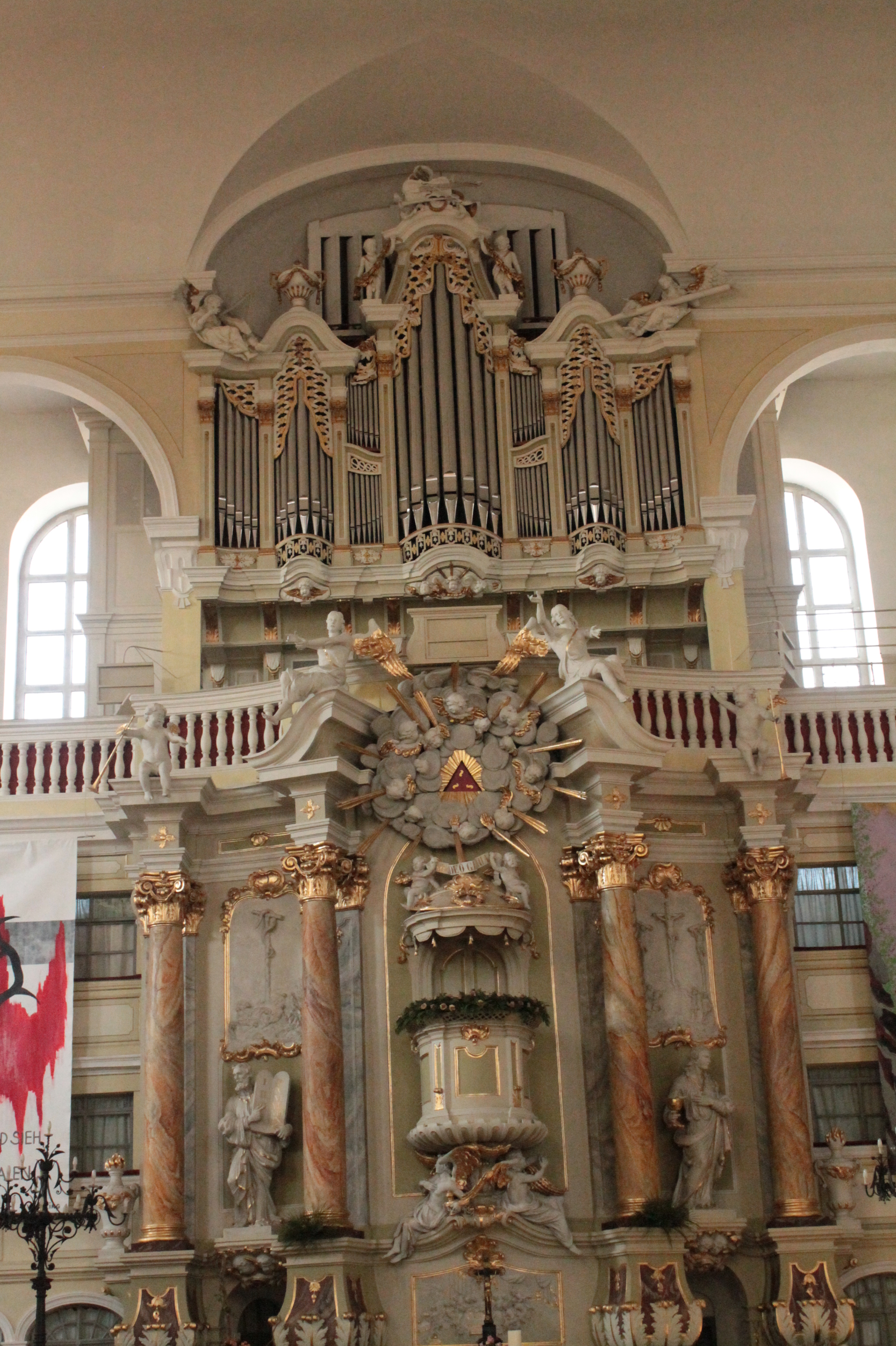
The altarpiece in the Marienkirche, Grossenhain

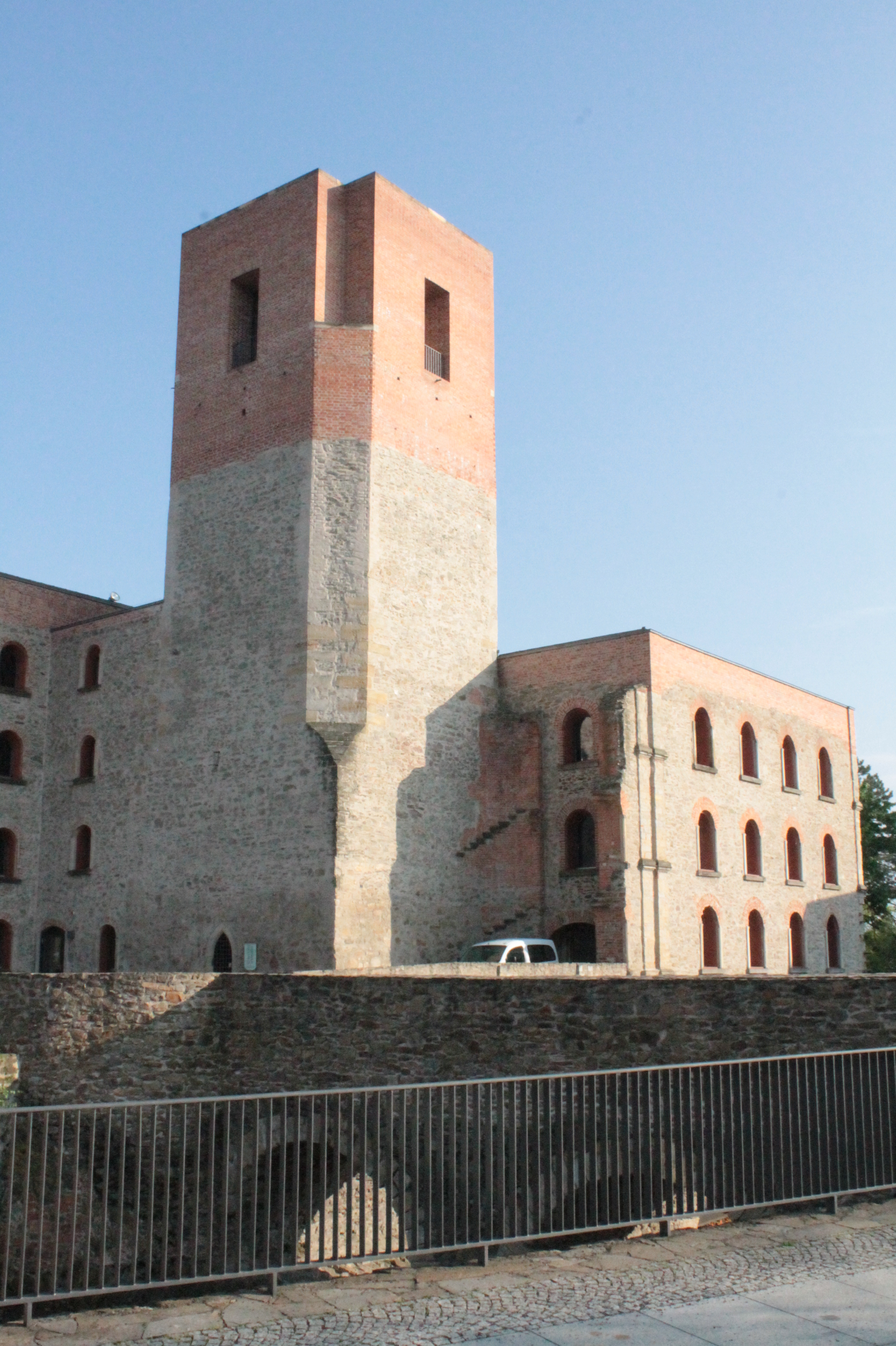
Kulturzentrum, Grossenhain

Großenhain is located on the river Röder, 30 km (19 mi) northwest of Dresden, and 17 km (11 mi) east of Riesa. It is also situated on Via Regia from Görlitz to Santiago de Compostela.

=== Divisions ===
The town Großenhain consists of Großenhain proper and the following Ortschaften or municipal divisions:

- Bauda
- Colmnitz
- Folbern
- Görzig
- Nasseböhla (incl. Stroga)
- Skassa
- Skäßchen (incl. Krauschütz, Skaup and Uebigau)
- Strauch
- Walda-Kleinthiemig
- Weßnitz-Rostig
- Wildenhain
- Zabeltitz (incl. Treugeböhla)

These Ortschaften correspond with former municipalities or their divisions, that were absorbed into Großenhain between 1994 and 2010. The localities Großraschütz, Kleinraschütz, Mülbitz, Naundorf, Zschauitz and Zschieschen are former municipalities that were absorbed into Großenhain between 1913 and 1961.

== Infrastructure ==
There are two train stations in Großenhain. The Großenhain Berliner Bahnhof had been out of service since 2002, leaving only the Großenhain Cottbusser Bahnhof, served by trains from Dresden to Elsterwerda, Cottbus and Hoyerswerda.

Großenhain is accessible by car via Bundesstraße 98 and Bundesstraße 101.

== Famous people ==
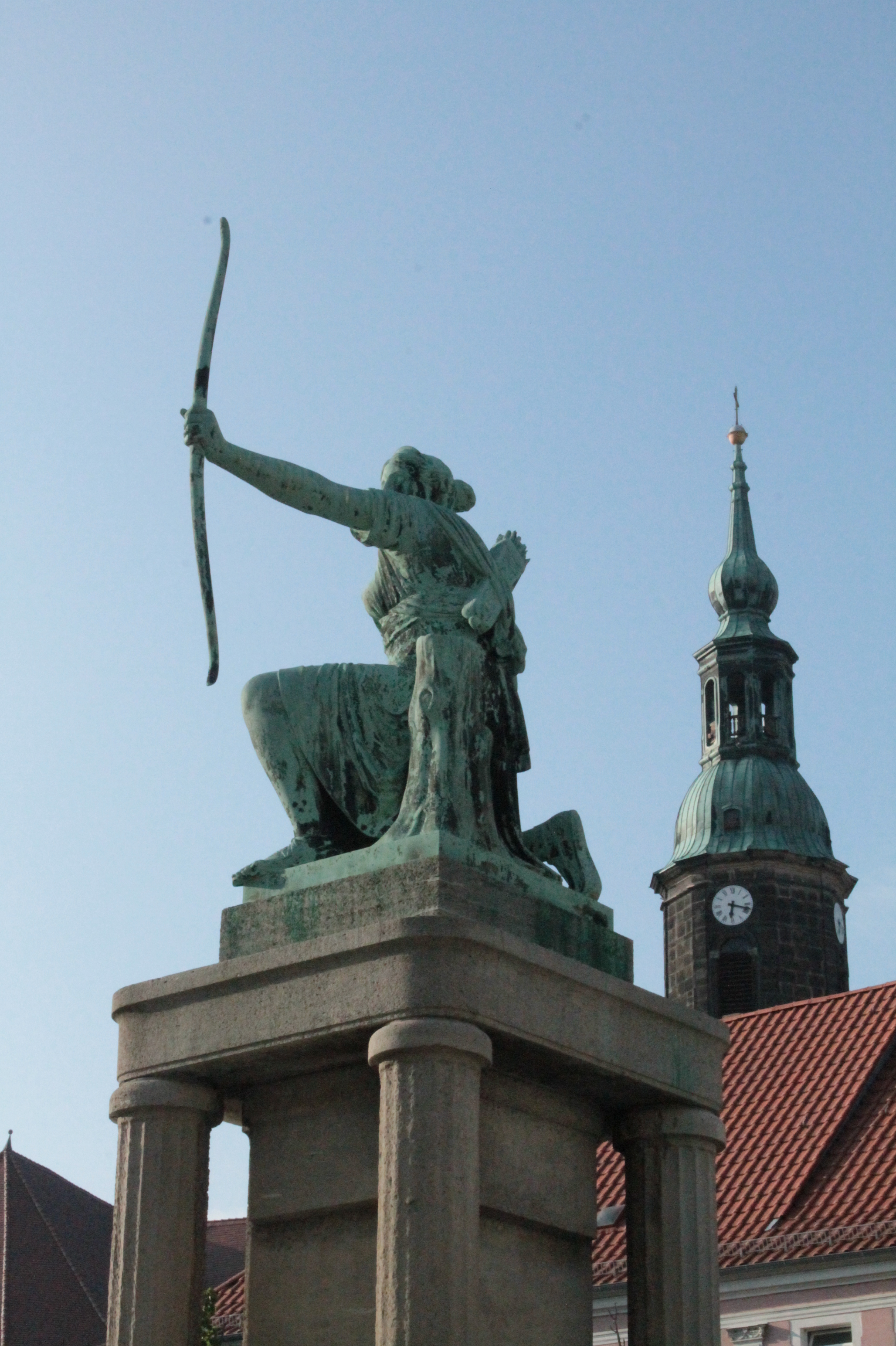
Statue in Grossenhain town square looking north to the spire of the Marienkirche

- Mario Beger (born 1966), politician (AfD)
- Martin Blochwich (1602-1629): German physician, born here
- Lucas Krzikalla (born 1994): German handball player, born here
- Karl Benjamin Preusker (1786–1871): Founder of the first public library in Germany (1828)
- Manfred von Richthofen (1892–1918): German fighter pilot known as The Red Baron, was trained as observer at the local airport
- Corinna Harfouch (born 1954): German actress, passed her childhood here
- Benjamin Hedericus (1675-1748): Lexicographer
- Heino (born 1938): German schlager artist, passed his childhood here
- Carlo Mierendorff (1897-1943), representatives of the SPD, a member of the German Reichstag and resistance fighter against Nazism
- Frederick Traugott Pursh (1774-1820), actually Friedrich Pursch , botanist
- Helmut H. Schaefer (1925-2005), mathematician, professor at the University of Halle (Saale), at the University of Tübingen, at the California Institute of Technology and other US universities
- Ingo Senftleben (born 1974), German politician (CDU)
- Valentin Weigel (1533-1588), theologian and philosopher
- André Wendt (born 1971), politician
- Frieder Zschoch (1932–2016), musicologist
