= Martin Blochwich =

German physician

- Born: 1602; Großenhain, Saxony
- Died: 10 September 1629 (aged 26–27); Oschatz, Saxony
- Education: Medical Faculty of the University of Base (Switzerland)
- Known for: Wrote the first book about the medicinal uses of the European elderberry tree (Sambucus nigra), which still is regarded as the standard text today.

Martin Blochwich (c. 1602 – 10 September 1629) was a German physician and author. He wrote the first book, The Anatomy of the Elder, about the medicinal uses of the European elderberry tree (Sambucus nigra), which still is regarded as the standard text for the practice.

== School and studies ==
After his elementary school years in Großenhain, Blochwich was accepted by the Fürstenschule Schulpforta in Naumburg (Saale), where he obtained his university entrance qualification in 1622. He studied medicine at the Leipzig University until 1626. On 4 July 1626, the Medical Faculty of the University of Basel (Switzerland) awarded him a doctorate degree.

== Life and work ==
After his studies, Blochwich worked temporary in Großenhain, where he may have also researched his comprehensive work The Anatomy of the Elder. There are references to patients from Großenhain, which indicate this. In 1628 he settled in Oschatz.

== Early death ==
On 10 September 1629, Martin Blochwich died at the age of 26-27 in Oschatz. The cause of his death is unknown.

== The Anatomy of the Elder ==
In this book, Blochwich described the cultivated plant in three units over 298 pages.

- Unit 1: The botany of the elder with an explanation of the origin of the name, as well as where it could be found, its growth and characteristics.
- Unit 2: In six chapters Blochwich described the preparation of vinegar, chalk, compote, oil, tablets, ointment, juice, syrup, spirit, water, wine and sugar made of elder in detail and gave recipes.
- Unit 3: Thirty-three chapters about the treatment of diseases. Recipes have exact descriptions for the production of medicines made of elderflower, elderberry, elder marrow and elder bark. The book also contains references to the opinions of famous doctors from the Greek and Roman eras and the Middle Ages. These sections provided advice to doctors of Blochwich's era on using elder preparations internally and externally.

The conditions include breast and uterine diseases, frostbite, tumours, infectious diseases, lung disease, stomach, intestines, spleen and gall bladder, mental illness, stroke and paralysis, tuberculosis, unclear fever and pain, poisonings, injuries, worm infestation and toothache.

== Distribution of the book ==
- In 1631, two years after Blochwich's death, Johannes Blochwich, who may have been his brother, published the Anatomia Sambuci, written in Latin, in Leipzig.
- In 1642 the book was translated into German by Daniel Beckher, a professor of medicine in Königsberg, who mentioned Blochwich's work in his own book Nützliche kleine Haus-Apotheke. After 1642, Blochwich's book was reprinted in 1650, 1665 and 1685. It is the only translation into German.
- In 1650 the Latin version of Anatomia Sambuci appeared in England. It was translated into English by Christopher Irvine in 1651 and published in English in 1655, 1670, 1677 on the recommendation of the British Royal Society.
- In 2010 the Anatomia Sambuci was reprinted and an updated English version of Anatomia Sambuci appeared.

== Memory honoured ==
On the occasion of the opening of the Elder Show Garden in Feldbach (Styria/Austria) a new elder variety previously known Klon B2 was renamed Blochwitz on 23 May 2013.

== Different spellings of the name ==
Blochwich's name has been spelt in several ways, which may have been due to the path taken by his book from Königsberg in East Prussia in 1642 to London in 1650 and the related translations. The name has been written as Blockwich, Blockwitz, Blochwich and Blochwitz.

== Literature ==
- Sepp Porta, Michael Hlatky, Johannes Christandl: Holunder-Wunderwelt; Verlagshaus der Ärzte; 1. Auflage (2012): ISBN 3990520148
- Manfred Schollmeyer: Die Anatomie des Holunders und seine medizinische Anwendung; Oschatzer Geschichts-und Heimatverein e. V.; 1. Auflage (2014): ISBN 9783000467981
