= James Coutts Crawford =

Royal Navy officer (1760–1828)

Captain James Coutts Crawford
- Born: 20 July 1760; Dundee, Scotland
- Died: 10 May 1828 (aged 67); Liverpool, Lancashire
- Relatives: Coutts Crawford (son)
- Military career
- Allegiance: United Kingdom
- Branch: Royal Navy
- Service years: 1777–1828
- Rank: Captain
- Commands: HMS Childers; HMS Champion; HMS Venus; HMS Hussar; HMS Modeste
- Conflicts: American Revolutionary War; Siege of Savannah; Siege of Charleston; Great Siege of Gibraltar; French Revolutionary Wars; Napoleonic Wars; Peninsular War; Invasion of Java

Captain James Coutts Crawford (20 July 1760 – 10 May 1828) was an officer in the Royal Navy who served during the American War of Independence and the French Revolutionary and Napoleonic Wars.

Crawford first went to sea aboard merchant vessels, trading with North America, before joining the navy during the American War of Independence. He saw action on shore on several occasions, distinguishing himself in the defence of Savannah and the siege of Charleston. Returning from North America with despatches, he was given a hired ship and acted in support of the British defences during the Great Siege of Gibraltar. During this conflict he was heavily engaged on numerous occasions with Spanish gunboats, and came to the attention of Roger Curtis, later to become a prominent naval officer. After a period of unemployment following the end of the American War of Independence, Curtis saw to it that Crawford was offered a position in the fleet during the Spanish Armament. When war was averted, Crawford went out to the East Indies for several years on personal business.

While returning to Britain after the outbreak of the French Revolutionary Wars, Crawford's ship was captured by the French. He was kept as a prisoner of war until 1797, when he was able to return to the navy and joined the flagship of his old patron, Sir Roger Curtis. After two years in this post, he was given his own ship, which he commanded until the end of the French Revolutionary Wars. Promoted to post-captain in 1802, he was again unemployed for a time, until being given command of various frigates, at first supporting the Spanish in the Peninsular War, but later being sent to the East Indies. Here Crawford took part in the Invasion of Java in 1811, before returning to Britain. He went on half-pay as the wars with France drew to a close, and died, still a post-captain, in 1828.

== Family and early life ==
Crawford was born at Dundee on 20 July 1760, the son of James Crawford and his wife Helen, née Coutts. Helen was a cousin of the owners of the large London banking firm Coutts. He initially went to sea aboard merchant ships, making several voyages to trade with the American colonies of Virginia and North and South Carolina, before joining the navy in April 1777.

== American War of Independence ==
=== North America ===
His first posting was as a midshipman aboard the sloop HMS Vigilant, then serving off the North American coast under the command of Lieutenant John Henry. Vigilant was armed with heavy cannon for supporting shore-based operations during the American War of Independence. Crawford served aboard Vigilant until late in 1777, when Henry was appointed to command the 20-gun HMS Fowey, upon which Crawford moved with his captain to the new ship. He continued as midshipman until one of the ship's lieutenants was wounded during operations around Boston. Henry then appointed him acting lieutenant on 24 October 1778.

Crawford took part in several important battles during the remainder of the war, commanding a battery of Fowey's guns that had been landed to defend Savannah during its siege. The besieging forces were eventually repulsed and for his good service there, Crawford was mentioned in the despatches written by Captain Henry, and the commander of the land forces, General Augustine Prevost. Fowey then moved to support the Siege of Charleston, which ended in the capitulation of the city to the British. Following this success, Captain Henry was again transferred, taking over command of the newly captured HMS Providence, with orders to take her back to Britain carrying despatches. Crawford again accompanied Henry, still with the rank of acting-lieutenant.

=== Gibraltar ===
Providence was placed out of commission shortly after her arrival in Britain, and Crawford reverted to his former rank of midshipman. He spent two months serving aboard the 100-gun HMS Britannia, the flagship of Vice-Admiral George Darby, until April 1781 when Darby gave him command of an armed vessel, the 5-gun Repulse. Repulse had been fitted with Spanish-made 26-pounders, and was based at Gibraltar during the great siege. The siege was intensified about this time, with the Spanish making determined efforts to oust the British. On 7 August 1781 he played an important role in the defence of the brig-rigged HMS Helena, which had been becalmed in the entrance of the Bay of Gibraltar. The Spanish sent 14 gunboats from Algeciras to attack her, against which the senior British officer, Roger Curtis, dispatched Crawford's Repulse, and another armed vessel, the Vanguard, to defend her. Despite the superior Spanish numbers, the three British vessels were able to fight off the gunboats and Helena was towed into harbour. After thirteen months commanding Repulse, often closely engaged with Spanish gunboats, Crawford was appointed acting first lieutenant of the 32-gun HMS Brilliant.

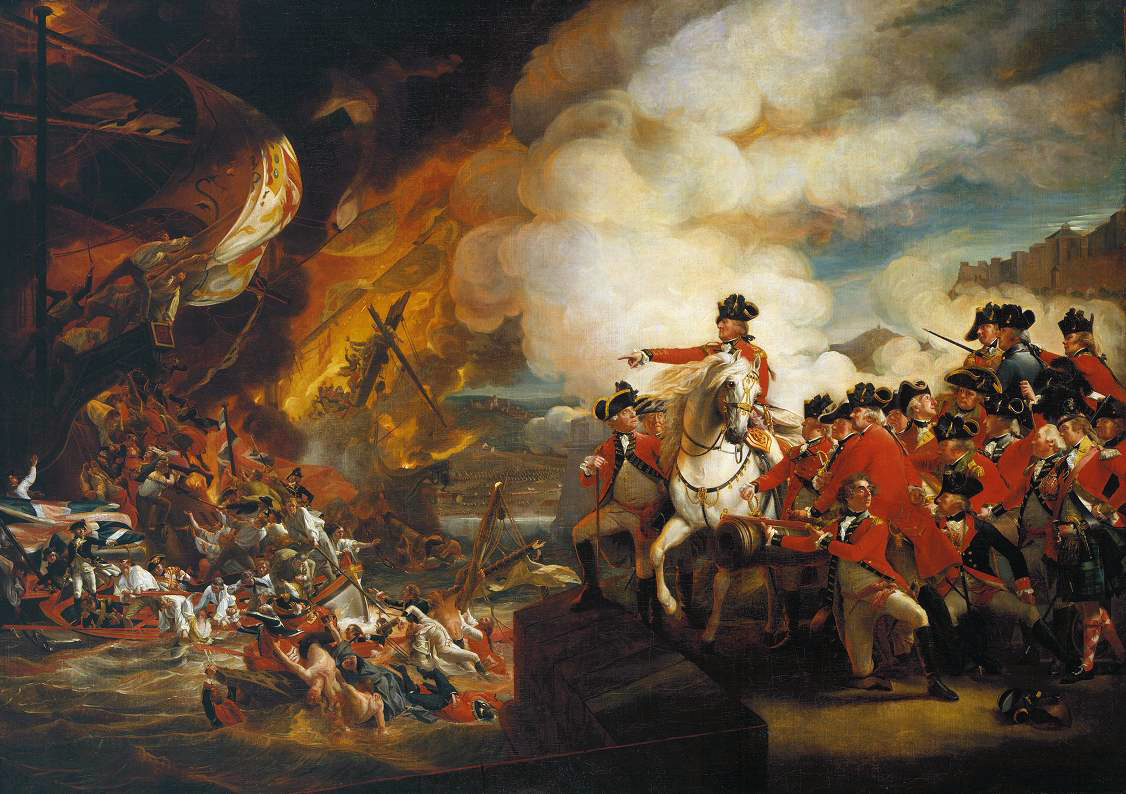
The Defeat of the Floating Batteries at Gibraltar, September 1782, by John Singleton Copley. Depicting the September assault, which Crawford served throughout.

All the previous assaults having failed to capture Gibraltar, a Franco-Spanish forced launched the biggest assault yet on the fortifications, on 13 September 1782. Anticipating the assault, and the danger to shipping, the British scuttled Brilliant, and Crawford went ashore to serve with the naval brigade encamped at Europa Point under Curtis. He served as Curtis's brigade major during the assault, which was eventually repulsed. With the attack decisively defeated, the sunken Brilliant was re-floated within a few days and Crawford resumed his post aboard her, serving under Curtis. He remained her until October 1782, when he was moved to the recently captured Spanish ship of the line San Miguel, which had run aground off Gibraltar and forced to surrender. The Spanish made several attempts to recapture or destroy her, sending flotillas against her on 12 November and 18 December. Both attempts failed, though several days later the San Miguel was blown from her anchorage and had to be run aground. She stayed in British hands for the remainder of the war. San Miguel was eventually sailed to Britain under the command of Sir Charles Knowles, and Crawford joined Roger Curtis aboard the Brilliant in March 1783. His lieutenant's commission was confirmed by the Admiralty on 10 August 1783, but with the conclusion of the American War of Independence and the drawdown of the navy, there was little service available. Crawford does not appear to have served at sea for some time after his commission.

== Spanish Armament and French Revolutionary Wars ==
Crawford's former service with Curtis, now Sir Roger Curtis following his knighthood for his service at Gibraltar, brought dividends during the Spanish Armament. As the threat of war with Spain loomed, Curtis, by now captain of the fleet to Admiral Lord Howe recommended Crawford to Howe. Howe took Crawford aboard his flagship, the 100-gun HMS Queen Charlotte. The crisis passed without breaking into open war, and Crawford took a period of absence from the navy, going out to the East Indies where he attended to his personal affairs. He took passage back to Britain aboard a merchant ship at some point after the outbreak of the French Revolutionary Wars, but the ship was captured by a French warship en route. He was held as a prisoner of war until being exchanged in March 1797, and allowed to return to Britain. Once there he was appointed lieutenant aboard the 98-gun HMS Prince, which was at this time the flagship of Crawford's old patron, now Rear-Admiral Sir Roger Curtis, with the Channel Fleet. He remained with Curtis until his promotion to commander on 14 February 1799, and his subsequent appointment to command the 14-gun brig HMS Childers in March that year. He spent the rest of the war commanding her, principally off the British coast, and was promoted to post-captain on 29 April 1802.

== Napoleonic Wars ==
After a long period without a ship, Crawford was assigned to the 24-gun HMS Champion in 1808. He commanded her off the Spanish coast during the Peninsular War, supporting Spanish patriots against the French forces, later moving to the 32-gun HMS Venus to carry out the same service. During operations off Vigo Crawford arranged for the capitulation of the French garrison of the fort there, which caused his senior officer to write approvingly of his "liberal attention and zealous services". Vigo was then besieged by a French army led by Marshal Michel Ney, causing Crawford to land a party of seamen and marines, and lead them against the French in defence of the city. The French were defeated at the Battle of Puente Sanpayo and forced back towards Lugo.

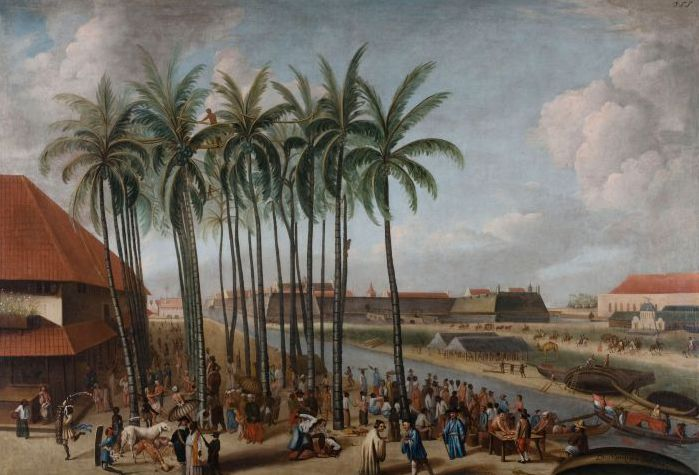
Batavia, on the island of Java, target of the British force in mid-1811

Crawford commissioned the 38-gun HMS Hussar in late 1810 and sailed for the East Indies in February 1811. He served at the reduction of Java between August and September 1811. In 1813 he took command of the 36-gun HMS Modeste and on 6 February 1813 captured the 14-gun privateer Furet off Sicily. Modeste was put out of commission towards the end of the wars and Crawford went on half-pay. He does not appear to have served at sea again.

== Family and later life ==
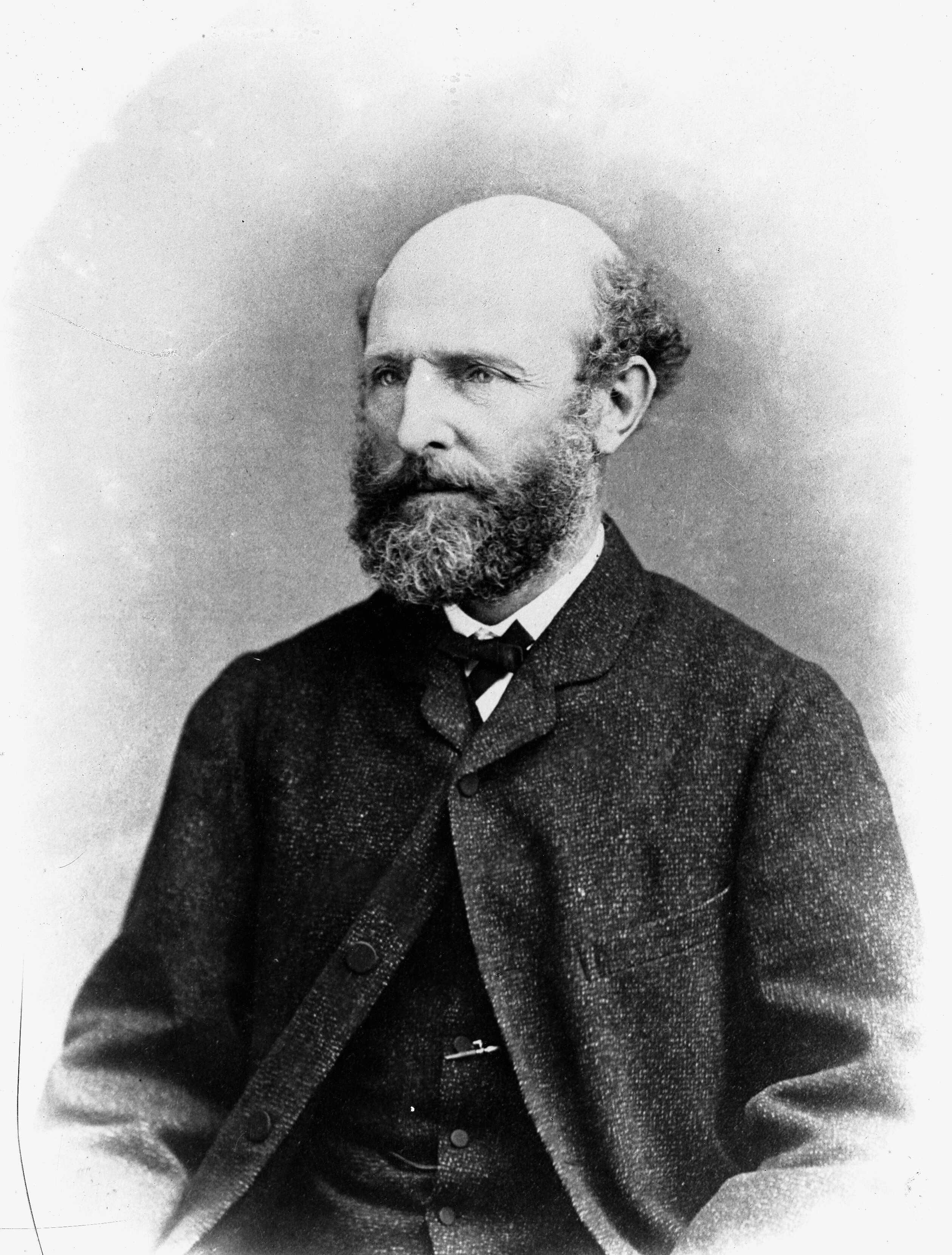
James Coutts Crawford, a naval officer like his father, and later a prominent citizen of New Zealand

Crawford was twice married, his first wife was Anne Duncan, with whom he had a daughter, Mary. Mary married the naval officer Henry Duncan in 1823. Crawford's second wife, Jane Inglis, was the eldest daughter of Vice-Admiral John Inglis. The couple had a son together, James Coutts Crawford, better known as Coutts Crawford. Captain James Coutts Crawford died at Liverpool on 10 May 1828, at the age of 67. He had been travelling to London, but was taken ill and died after a few days.
