= Coutts Crawford =

New Zealand Naval officer, farmer, scientist, explorer and public servant

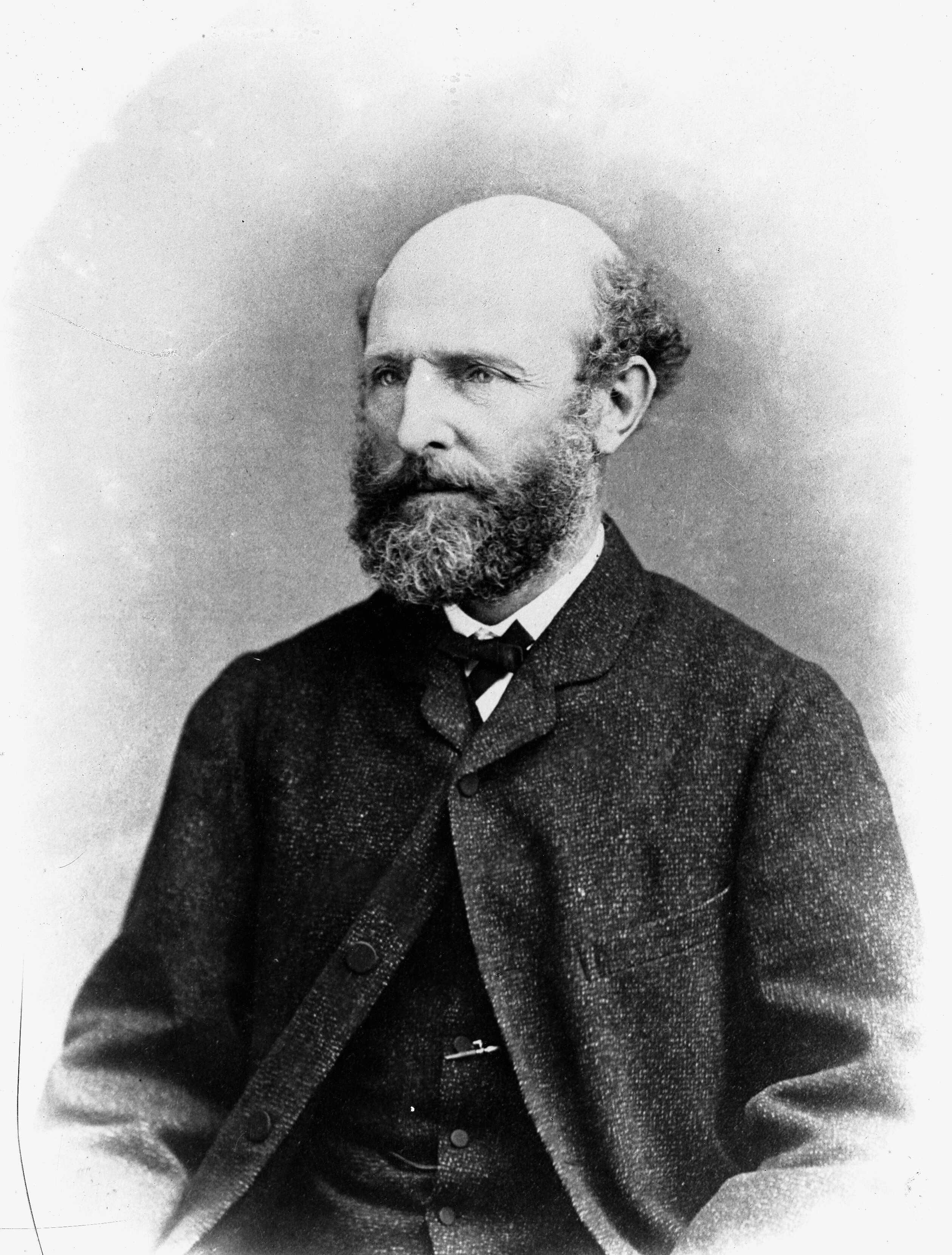
- Born: James Coutts Crawford; 19 January 1817; Strathaven, Lanarkshire, Scotland
- Died: 8 April 1889 (aged 72); London, England
- Education: Royal Naval College, Portsmouth
- Occupations: Public official, landowner
- Spouse(s): (1)Sophia Whitley Deans Dundas; (2)Jessie Cruickshank McBarnet
- Children: (1) 1d, 1s; (2) 3s
- Parents: James Coutts Crawford (father); Jane Inglis (mother)
- Relatives: John Inglis (Royal Navy officer) (grandfather)

James Coutts Crawford (19 January 1817 – 8 April 1889), known as Coutts Crawford, was a naval officer, farmer, scientist, explorer and public servant in New Zealand.

He was born in Strathaven, South Lanarkshire, Scotland in 1817 and came to New Zealand in 1839. He settled in Wellington, owning the Miramar Peninsula and parts of Rongotai and Kilbirnie, which he named after the town in Scotland. Crawford was active in local affairs. He served on the New Zealand Legislative Council from 1859 to 1867. He died in London in 1889.

Mount Crawford (South Australia) and several locations in Wellington are named after him.

== Early life and family ==
Crawford was born in Strathaven, South Lanarkshire, Scotland, the son of naval officer James Coutts Crawford, and his second wife, Jane Inglis. His maternal grandfather was Admiral John Inglis. Crawford was educated at the Royal Naval College in Portsmouth, then went to sea with the navy in 1831, aged 14. He was awarded a Royal Humane Society medal for jumping overboard to rescue sailors on two occasions in 1834, while he was a College Midshipman on HMS Dublin. In 1836 Crawford became a sub-lieutenant, but he discharged himself from the navy in 1837.

Crawford was a captain in the Militia.

In 1838, Crawford sailed to Sydney, Australia. He bought 700 cattle and, with the help of an overseer and seven workers, drove the herd overland on a five-month journey between Sydney and Adelaide, arriving there in April 1839. Charles Sturt named Mount Crawford in South Australia after Crawford, who set up a cattle run near the hill on his arrival from Sydney.

In 1839 Crawford visited New Zealand and bought land in Wellington. He went back to Sydney to buy stock for his land, then returned to New Zealand. In 1841 he returned to England, marrying Sophia Whitley Deans Dundas in Berkshire in 1843. Their daughter Janet was born in 1844, and then the family returned to Australia, where Crawford bought property in Queensland in 1845. In 1846 Crawford and his family returned to Wellington, before heading back to the United Kingdom where his son James Dundas Crawford was born in 1850. Sophia Crawford died in 1852. Crawford remarried in Scotland in 1857 to Jessie Cruickshank McBarnet, before returning to settle in New Zealand. They had three sons born in New Zealand: Henry Duncan (1859–1908), Alexander Donald (1862–1935) and Charles John (1867–1945). Jessie died in 1880 at Overton House in Scotland.

== Development of Wellington's eastern suburbs ==
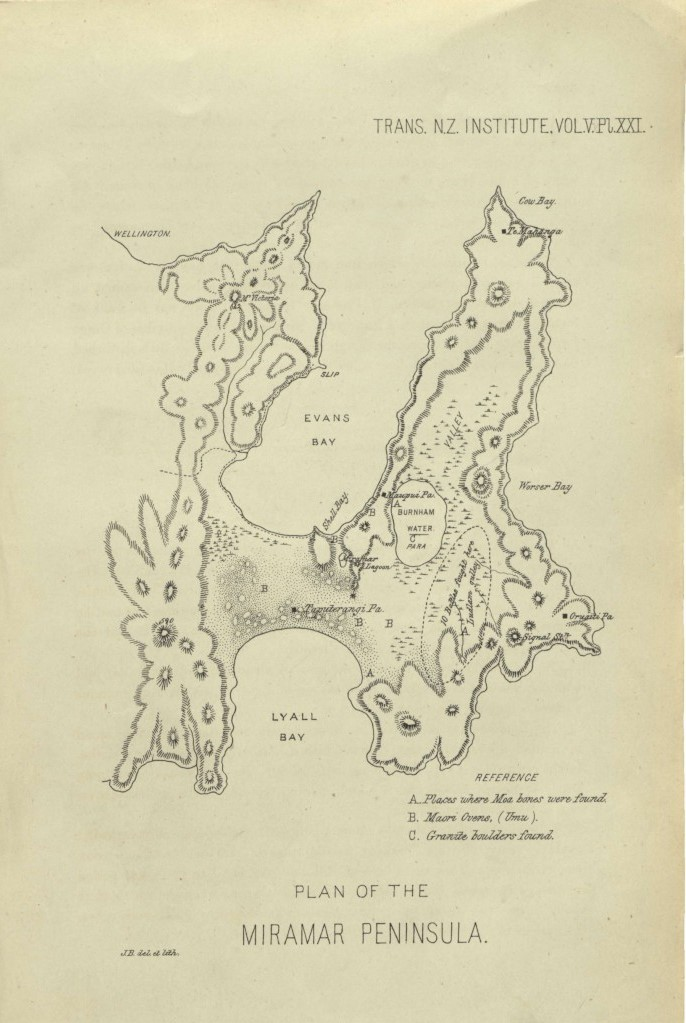
Map of Miramar Peninsula, showing the location of Burnham Water and surrounding swampy area.

On his arrival in Wellington in 1839, Crawford bought most of the Miramar Peninsula, then known as Watts Peninsula. He later bought the remaining portions from other landowners, eventually owning the whole of the peninsula. On his return to Wellington in 1846, he established a farm ('Glendavar') on the north of the peninsula. The centre of the peninsula contained a shallow lake of about 200 acres, known to Māori as Para or Te Roto Kura, and to Europeans as Burnham Water, which was surrounded by swamps. In 1847, Crawford built what may have been the first tunnel in New Zealand, to drain the lake into Evans Bay. He enlarged the tunnel and did further drainage work on the swamps in 1859. Crawford sowed various types of grasses to fix the sand in parts of the peninsula and improve the former swampy areas. The former lake later became the site of the Miramar shopping area. In 1859, the Superintendent of Wellington proposed to tax landowners in Te Aro to pay for a sewerage and drainage scheme there. Amidst widespread opposition to the tax, the Wellington Spectator newspaper published an article alleging that:

the road at present leading to Burnham Water and Evans's Bay either is or will shortly be interrupted by the enclosure of some town acres over which it passes, and hence this attempt to make a road at the expense of the owners of property at the southern extremity of the Town to benefit those who will not in any way contribute to the undertaking, because their property is not within the limits of the Town, and consequently not affected by the Act.

Crawford objected to this statement, and at a public meeting said that the editor of the Wellington Spectator was a woman who was "an ugly old hag". His property at Watts (Miramar) Peninsula was not within the Wellington town limits, but Crawford stated that a road would be a general improvement that would be needed sooner or later, and he believed taxation was the best way forward.

In 1868, Crawford's brother-in-law Major McBarnet built a house which he named 'Miramar', at the south-east of Evans Bay. In 1872, Crawford proposed changing the name of the peninsula from Watts Peninsula to Miramar, and around this time moved from the city to live in McBarnet's house.

In 1877, Crawford sold allotments totalling 130 acres at Kilbirnie, which spurred the development of the suburb. The new property owners raised funds for a direct road from Newtown to Kilbirnie, which was built in 1878 and named after Crawford.

In 1878, Crawford put up for sale 100 acres of land divided into 200 sections at his new "Township of Seatoun". Roads had already been laid out and "partially formed", with allowance for future tram lines, and land was set aside for churches, schools and parks.

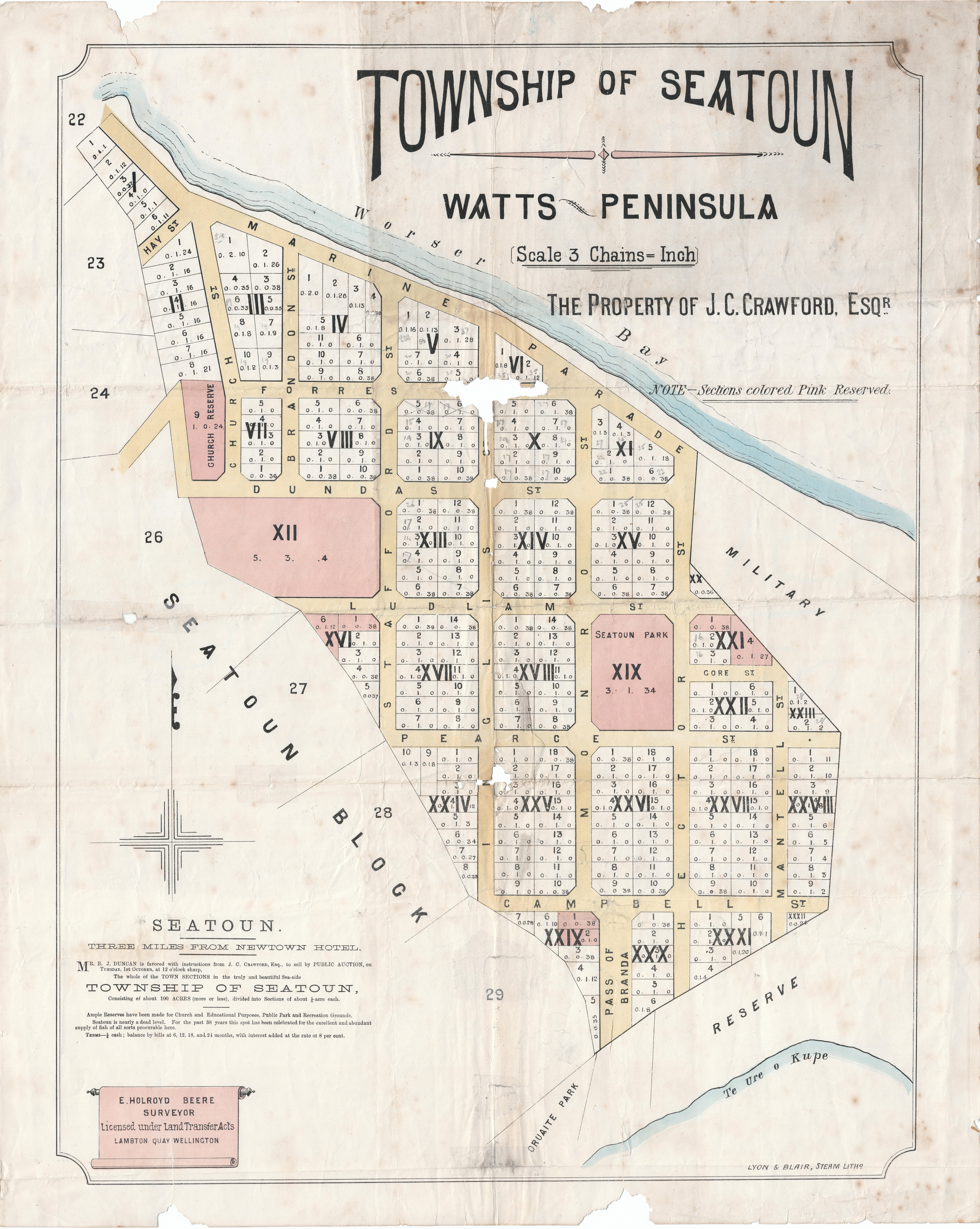
1878 map of proposed township of Seatoun.

In 1878, Crawford donated land at Kilbirnie for a church, and in 1881 he donated 4 acres for a recreation reserve and salt-water baths there. In 1882 he offered land for a school in Kilbirnie, but this was declined by the Education Board.

In 1886, the Government took 245 acres of Crawford's land at Evans Bay for defence purposes. This became the Shelly Bay base.

== New Zealand public life ==
Crawford took an active part in civic life in New Zealand. He was a captain in the Wellington Militia between 1860 and 1864. He served on the Legislative Council from 1859 until 1867, when he resigned for political reasons. Crawford had voted against a government bill, which prompted Edward Stafford, the then Premier of New Zealand, to state that Crawford's position on the Legislative Council was incompatible with his role as a magistrate.

Crawford was a keen amateur geologist, and was appointed as Wellington Provincial Geologist in 1861 until the government could bring a professional geologist to New Zealand. From 1861 to 1864 he explored the Whanganui and Rangitīkei rivers, the central plateau and northern Wairarapa, looking for mining potential and routes for road and rail. He became a member of the Geological Society of London, the Geological Society of Edinburgh and the Imperial and Royal Geological Society of Vienna.

In 1864 Crawford established and presided over the Resident Magistrate and Warden's Court at Havelock in Pelorus Sound for some months. He was appointed Resident Magistrate in Wellington in 1864 and Sheriff of Wellington in 1866.

From 1867, Crawford was a member of the Wellington Philosophical Society and the New Zealand Institute (later known as the Royal Society of New Zealand). He presented many papers about geology, farming, drainage and other subjects that interested him.

In 1867, Crawford became a founding member of the Wellington Benevolent Society, an organisation formed to relieve poverty in the city. He resigned his position as chairman of the society in April 1878, after members of Temperance groups said that it was hypocritical of him to administer funds to destitute families while creating drunkenness and harm by granting licences to public houses in his role as chairman of the Licensing Bench.

In June 1878, Crawford resigned as Sheriff and was replaced as Resident Magistrate because he was over the age of compulsory retirement. On his retirement, Crawford went to the United Kingdom in March 1879 for an extended stay. Crawford's wife Jessie died there in 1880, and Crawford returned to Wellington by early 1884.

== Death and legacy ==
With his health failing, Crawford returned to London around 1887 to seek medical advice. He died there on 8 April 1889, of kidney and bladder disease. Crawford left his land to be divided between his three younger sons: Henry received land on the isthmus and Kilbirnie, and Alexander and Charles formed a partnership to manage the Miramar Peninsula. Charles later became Mayor of Miramar and Henry became Mayor of Melrose, before these areas were merged into Wellington city. In 1901 and 1904, Alexander and Charles offered large areas of the peninsula to Wellington City Council, but on both occasions the Council declined their proposals. The land was then broken up and sold to various private syndicates and speculators.

Crawford kept detailed diaries of his travels in Australia and throughout New Zealand, and in 1880 published a book called Recollections of travel in New Zealand and Australia. He also drew and painted many images of the places he visited, which together with his diaries are of historical interest.

=== Wellington place names ===
Many place names in the eastern suburbs of Wellington are linked to Crawford's family. Aside from James Street (now Samoa Street, Kilbirnie), Coutts Street (Kilbirnie), Crawford Road (Kilbirnie), Crawford Green (Strathmore) and Mount Crawford (Miramar), others include:

- Charles Street (now part of Moxham Avenue, Hataitai): Coutts' son Charles
- Cruickshank Street (Lyall Bay): Coutts' second wife
- Duncan Street (Kilbirnie): Coutts' son, Henry Duncan Crawford
- Dundas Street (Seatoun): Coutts' first wife, whose name was also given to Coutts' son, James Dundas Crawford
- Hamilton Road and Busaco Street (Hataitai): named for General John Hamilton, a close friend of Crawford, who fought at the Battle of Bussaco
- Henry Street (Kilbirnie): Coutts' son, Henry Duncan Crawford
- Inglis Street (Seatoun): Coutts' mother, Jane Inglis
- Kilbirnie: Kilbirnie, a town in Ayrshire, Scotland that was home to the Crawfords
- Monorgan Road (Seatoun): after old Crawford family holdings in Monorgan, Perthshire
- Nevay Road (Miramar): after Crawford ancestor Sir David Nevay
- Overtoun Terrace (Hataitai): Crawford family landholding near Strathaven in Lanarkshire
- Seatoun: after Easter Seatoun, Crawford family property in Forfarshire
- Torridon Road (Miramar): after property owned in Torridon, Scotland, by Jessie McBarnet's father
- Vallance Street (Kilbirnie): friends of the Crawford family
