= Ralph Basset (disambiguation) =

Ralph Basset (died 1127) was an English royal justice.

Ralph Basset may also refer to:

- Ralph Basset (died 1265), English baronial leader
- Ralph Basset (died 1282), English baronial leader
- Ralph Basset, 1st Lord Basset of Drayton (died 1299)
- Ralph Basset, 2nd Baron Basset of Drayton (died 1343)
- Ralph Basset, 3rd Baron Basset of Drayton (died 1390)
