= History of Edinburgh =

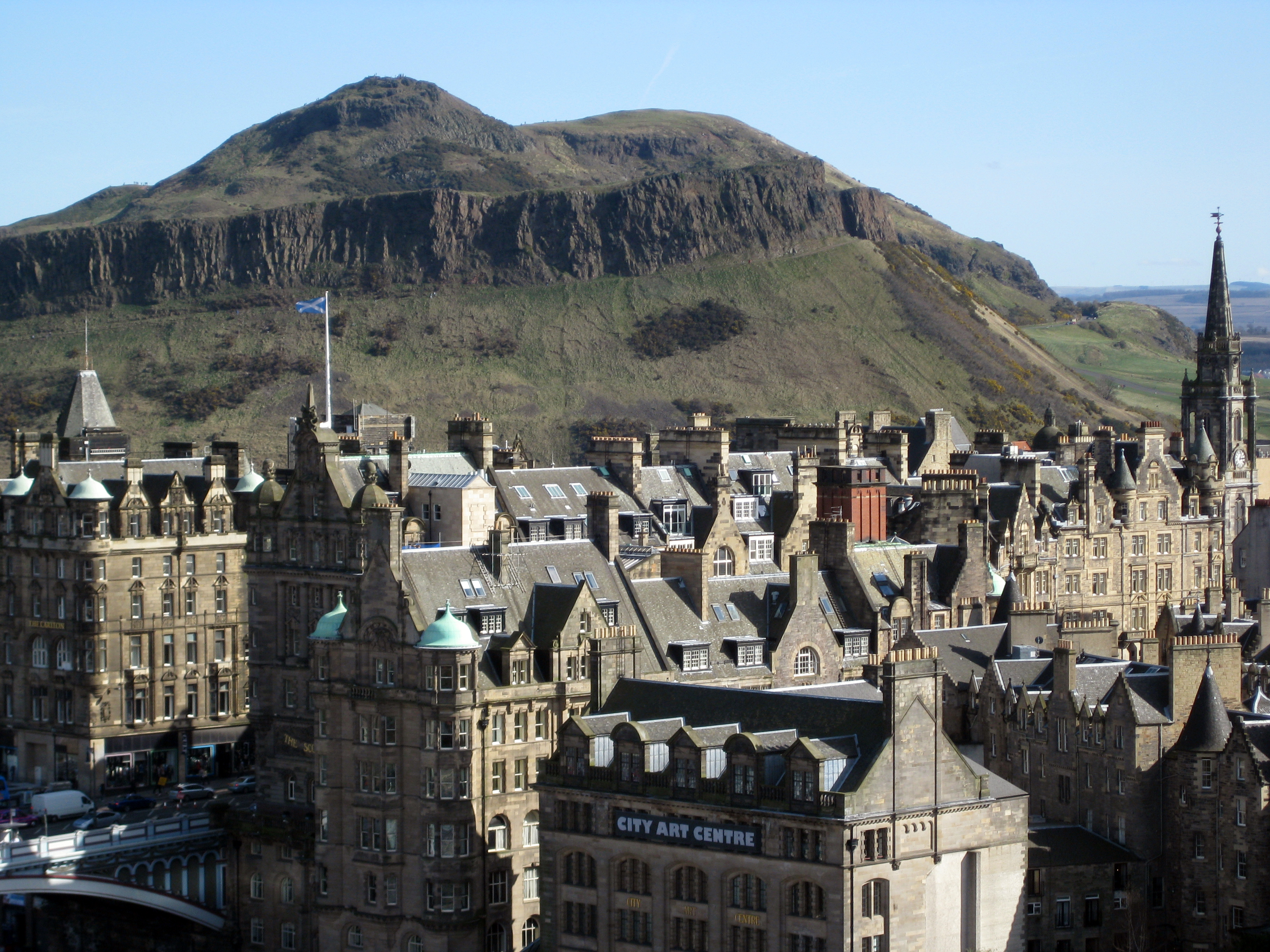
Edinburgh, showing Arthur's Seat, one of the earliest known sites of human habitation in the area

While the area around modern-day Edinburgh has been inhabited for thousands of years, the history of Edinburgh as a definite settlement can be traced to the early Middle Ages when a hillfort was established in the area, most likely on the Castle Rock. From the seventh to the tenth centuries it was part of the Anglian Kingdom of Northumbria, becoming thereafter a royal residence of the Scottish kings. The town that developed next to the stronghold was established by royal charter in the early 12th century, and by the middle of the 14th century was being described as the capital of Scotland. The area known as the New Town was added from the second half of the 18th century onwards. Edinburgh was Scotland's largest city until Glasgow outgrew it in the first two decades of the 19th century. Following Scottish devolution in the very late 20th century, Scotland's Parliament was re-established in Edinburgh.

== Origins ==
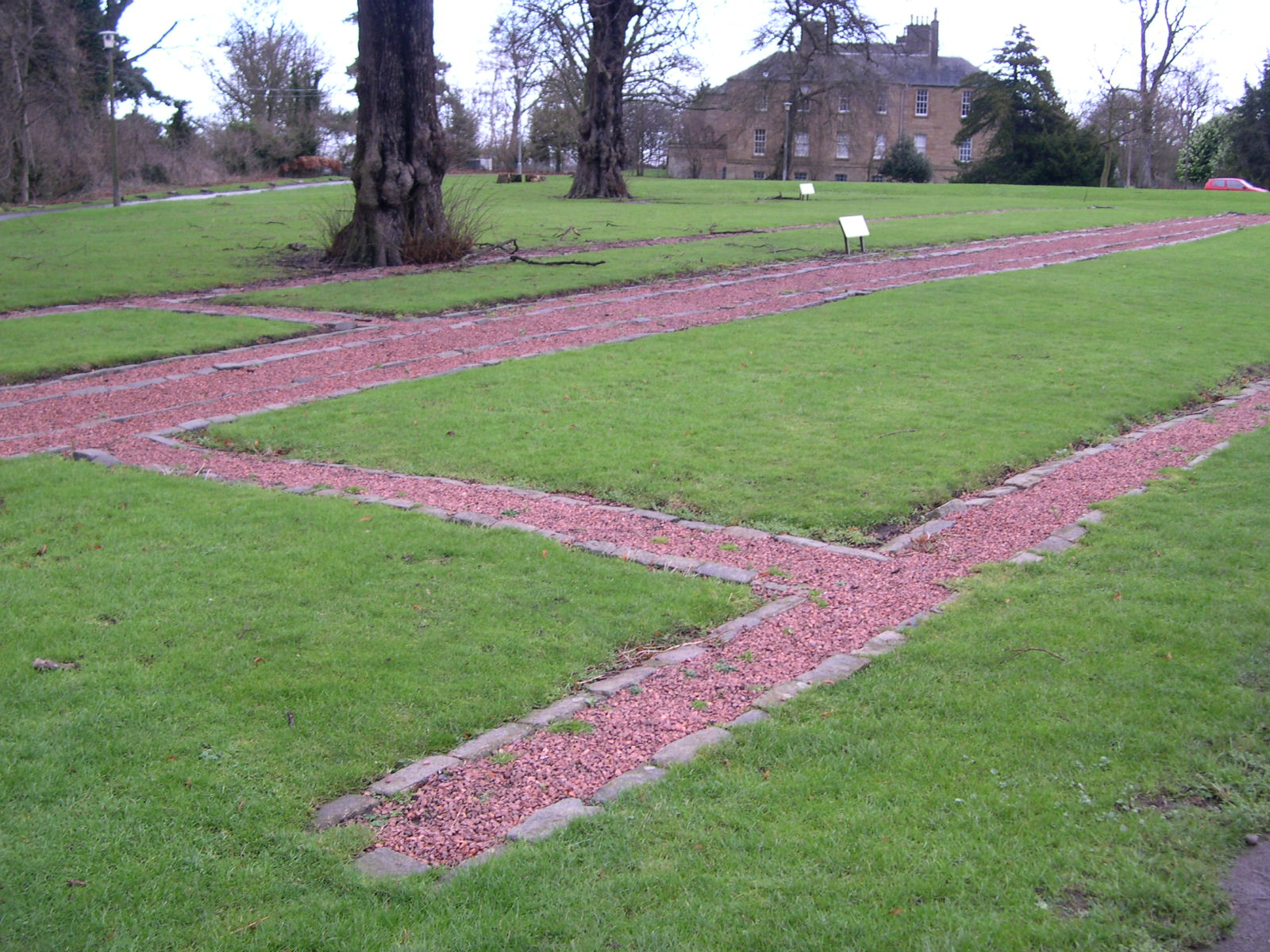
The site of the Roman fort at Cramond.

The earliest known human habitation in the Edinburgh area is from Cramond where evidence has been found of a Mesolithic site dated to c.8500 BC. Traces of later Bronze Age and Iron Age settlements have been found on the Castle Rock, Arthur's Seat, Craiglockhart Hill and the Pentland Hills. The culture of these early inhabitants bears similarities with the Celtic cultures of the Iron Age found at Hallstatt and La Tène in central Europe. When the Romans arrived in the Lothian area towards the end of the 1st century AD, they discovered a Celtic Brythonic tribe whose name they recorded as the Votadini. The Romans established a fort at Cramond, within what later grew to be Edinburgh. Traditional scholarship situated Cramond in the northerly Roman province of Valentia although this is now disputed. Certainly, it was connected to York with the Roman Road known as Dere Street.

At some point before the 7th century AD, the Gododdin, presumed descendants of the Votadini, built a hillfort known as Din Eidyn in the area of Eidyn, modern Edinburgh. Although the exact location of the hillfort has not been identified, it seems more than likely they would have chosen the commanding position of the Castle Rock, or Arthur's Seat or the Calton Hill. During the time of the Gododdin, the territory of Lothian came to be recognized, with Edinburgh as its main stronghold. Around the year 600, Welsh tradition records that Mynyddog Mwynfawr, the Brythonic ruler of the kingdom of Gododdin, assembled a force within the vicinity of Edinburgh to oppose Germanic settlers to the south. This force was decisively defeated by the Angles at the Battle of Catraeth (probably at Catterick).

== Northumbrian Edinburgh (7th to 10th centuries) ==
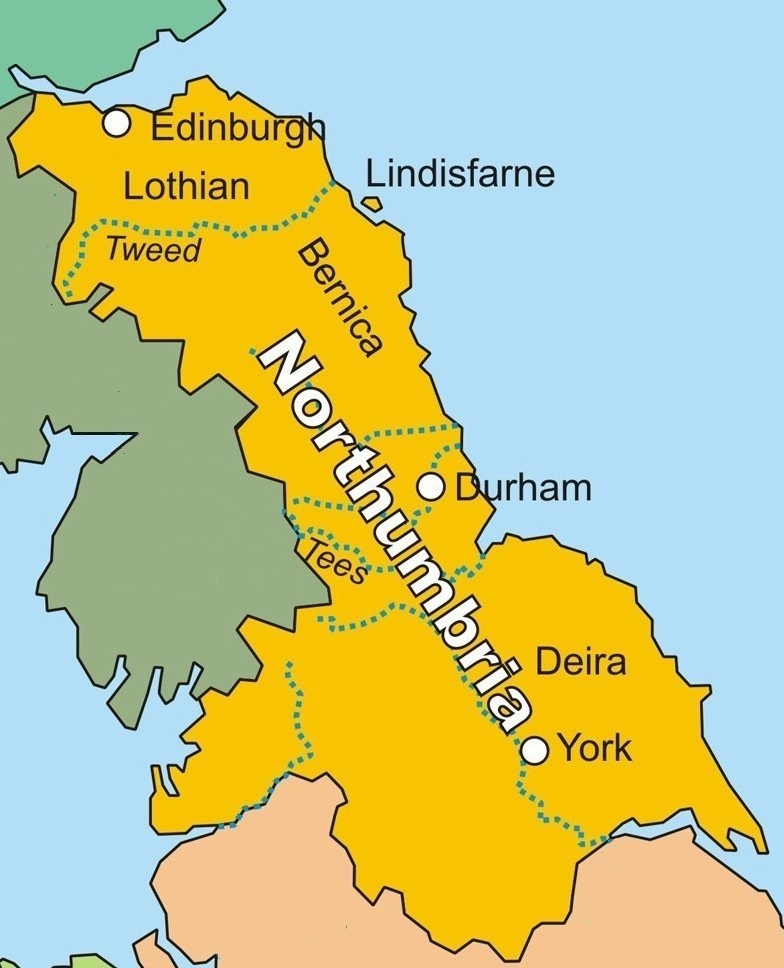
Kingdom of Northumbria, c. AD 800

The Angles of the Kingdom of Bernicia had a significant influence on what would be successively Bernicia, Northumbria and finally south-east Scotland, notably from AD 638 when it appears that the Gododdin stronghold was besieged by forces loyal to King Oswald of Northumbria. Whether or not this battle marked the precise passing of control over the hillfort of Etin from the Brythonic Celts to the Northumbrians, it was around this time that the Edinburgh region came under Northumbrian rule. In the following years the Angles extended their influence west and north of Edinburgh but following their defeat at the Battle of Nechtansmere in AD 685 Edinburgh may have come to mark the north west extremity of the Angles' kingdom. According to the Anglo-Saxon Chronicle, in 710 the Angles fought against the Picts between the rivers Avon and Carron which flow into the River Forth from the south about 20 miles west of Edinburgh. Though not exclusive, Anglian influence predominated from the mid-seventh century to the mid-tenth century, with Edinburgh as a frontier stronghold. During this period Edinburgh became a place where Northumbrian Old English was spoken and its name acquired the Old English suffix, "-burh".

While history records little about Northumbrian Edinburgh, the English chronicler Symeon of Durham, writing in c. 1130 and copying from earlier texts, mentioned a church at Edwinesburch in AD 854 which came under the authority of the Bishop of Lindisfarne. It has been inferred from this report that there was therefore an established settlement by the middle of the ninth century. It is possible that this church was a forerunner of what was later to become St Giles' Cathedral or St Cuthbert's Church. Traditionally and less certainly, Saint Cuthbert is said to have preached the gospel around the Castle Rock in the second half of the seventh century.

The development of a fortress on the Castle Rock is shrouded in uncertainty. It has been suggested that a stronghold was established by the Northumbrians in the seventh century, but the archaeological and historical evidence is scant, except for indications that by the end of Edinburgh's Northumbrian period (the middle of the 10th century) there was some form of noble residence on the site.

In the late ninth century the Danelaw, centred on York, was established in the wake of Viking raids on Britain. The northern part of Northumbria was cut off from the rest of England by the Old Norse-speaking Danes, significantly weakening what remained of the kingdom. However, in 927 the English king, Athelstan, defeated the Danes and received the submission of the Anglo-Saxon Northumbrians. Seven years later, in 934, the Annals of Clonmacnoise record that Æthelstan, who spent much time stamping his authority upon the north, ravaged Scotland to Edinburgh but that he was forced to depart without any great victory. As Edinburgh was not part of Scotland at that time, the wording of the Chronicle in this regard has been described as "odd" and "difficult to understand." One explanation is that "to" or "as far as" Edinburgh should be read as "from", implying that Æthelstan assembled his forces at Edinburgh at the outset of his campaign.

During the tenth century the northernmost part of Northumbria, which had retained its Brythonic name Lothian, came under the sway of the Kingdom of Scotland. The 11th century Chronicle of the Kings of Alba records that "oppidum Eden", usually identified as Edinburgh, "was evacuated, and abandoned to the Scots until the present day." This has been read as indicating that Lothian was ceded to the Scottish king Indulf who reigned from AD 954 to 962. Thereafter Edinburgh generally remained under the jurisdiction of the Scots.

== Medieval burgh (11th century to 1560) ==
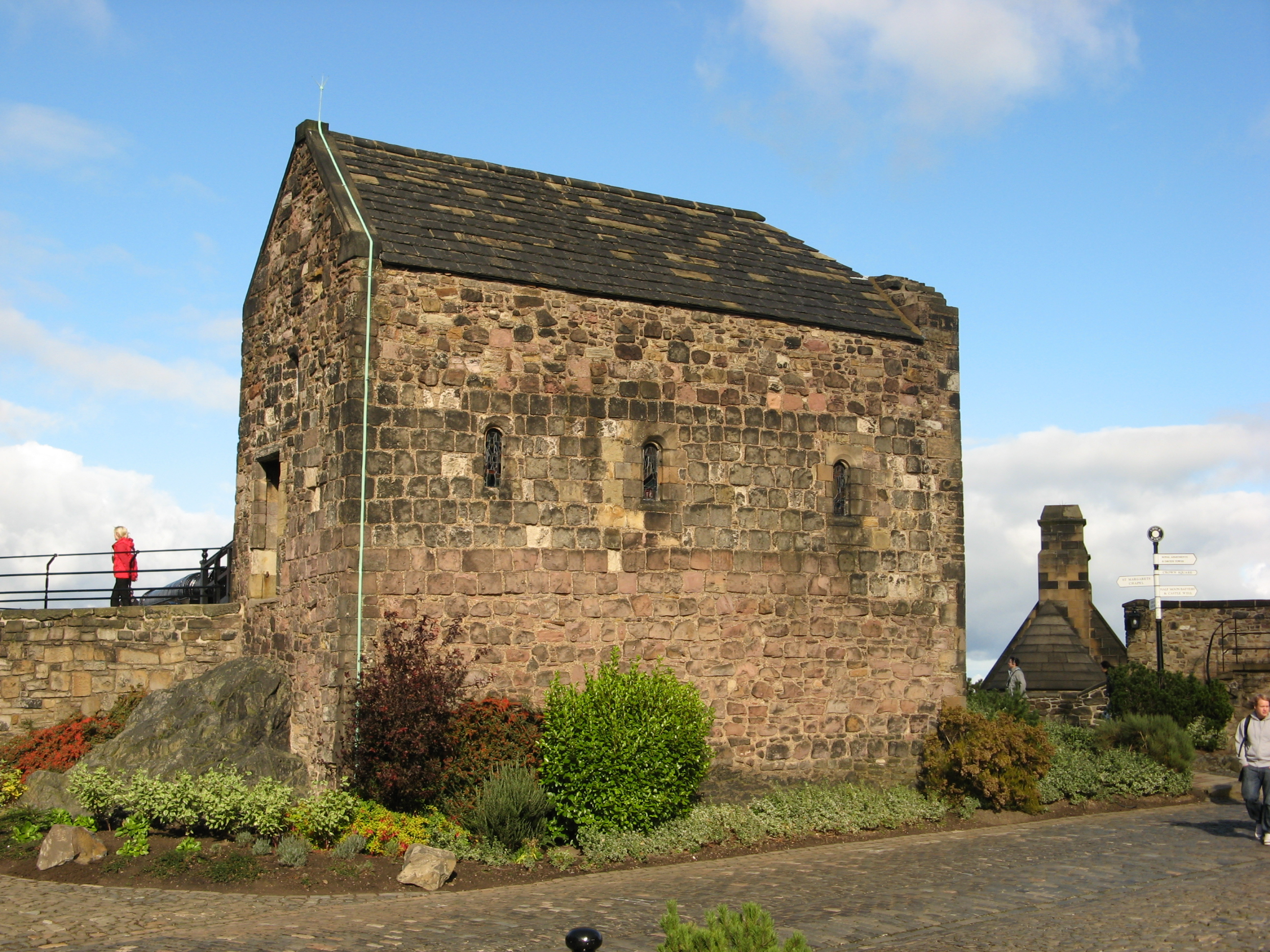
The 12th century St Margaret's Chapel, the oldest surviving building in Edinburgh.

In AD 973 during a royal council at Chester, the English king Edgar the Peaceful formally granted Lothian to Kenneth II, King of Scots. The historian Marjorie Anderson holds that this was the key event in assuring Scottish rule over Lothian. By the early 11th century the Scottish hold over the area was secured when Malcolm II ended the Northumbrian threat by his victory at the battle of Carham in 1018. While Malcolm Canmore (r.1058–1093) kept his court and residence at Dunfermline, north of the Forth, he began spending more time at Edinburgh where he built a chapel for his wife Margaret to carry out her devotions. St. Margaret's Chapel within Edinburgh Castle has been traditionally regarded as Edinburgh's oldest extant building, though most scholars now believe that in its surviving form it was more likely built by Margaret's youngest son David I in his mother's memory.

In the wake of the Norman Harrying of the North (1069–70), refugees fled from northern England to lowland Scotland, including Edinburgh.

In the 12th century (c.1130), King David I, established the town of Edinburgh as one of Scotland's earliest royal burghs, protected by his royal fortress, on the slope below the castle rock. Merchants were allocated strips of land known as "tofts", ranged along both sides of a long market street, on condition that they built a house on their land within a year and a day. Each toft stretched back from the street to a perimeter dyke and formed a private close (from Old French clos), meaning an enclosed yard. A separate, contiguous burgh of regality held by the Abbey of Holyrood developed to the east as the burgh of Canongate.

Edinburgh was largely in English hands from 1291 to 1314 and from 1333 to 1341, during the Wars of Scottish Independence. The English nobleman, Lord Basset was made Governor of Edinburgh Castle in 1291. When the English invaded Scotland in 1298, King Edward I chose not to enter the English controlled town of Edinburgh but passed by with his army.

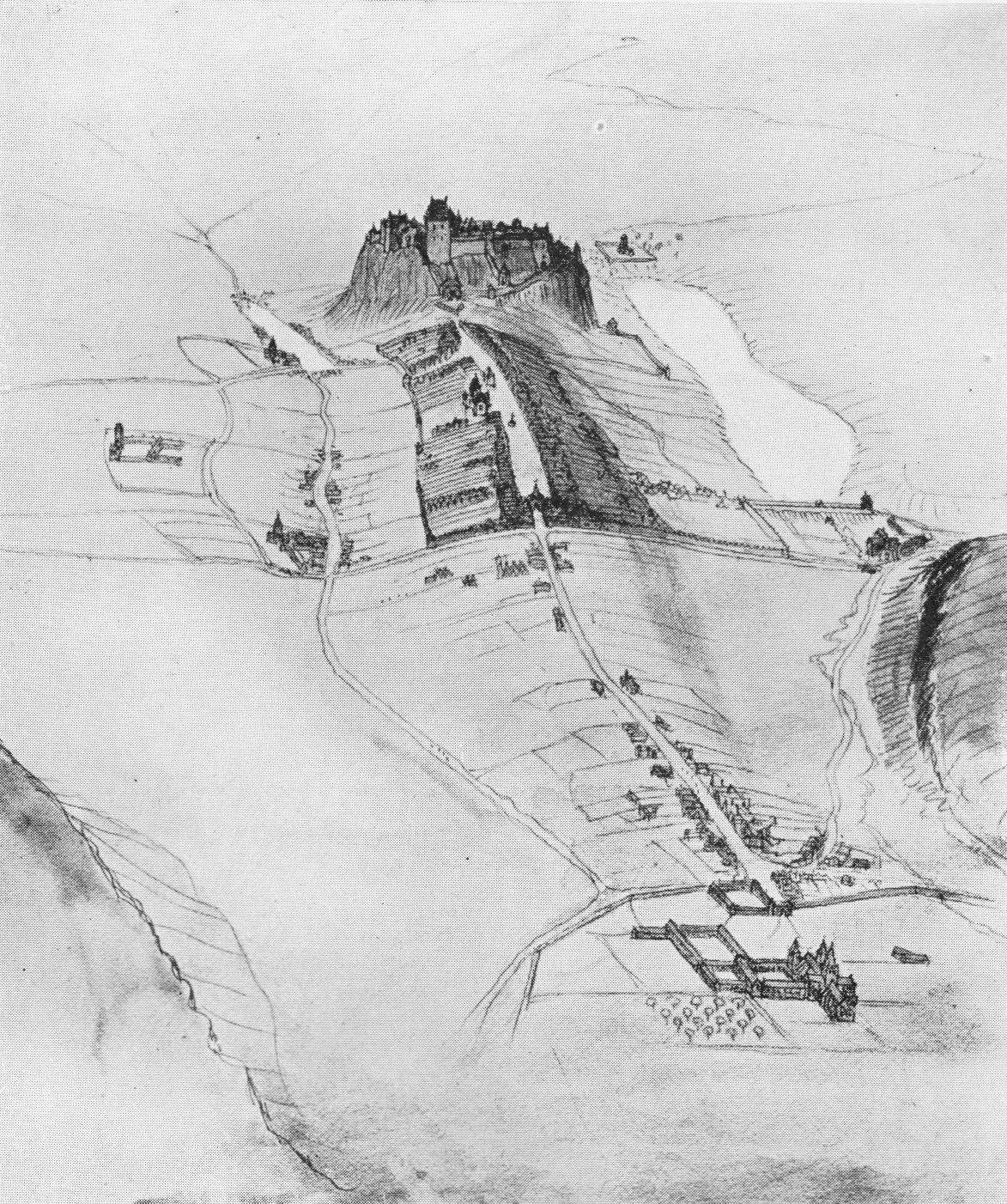
Reconstructed view of 15th century Edinburgh

In 1334, Edward Balliol, the English-backed claimant to the Scottish throne, granted Edward III of England large portions of southern Scotland, including Edinburgh as part of the Treaty of Newcastle. After the loss of Scotland's main trading port Berwick to English occupation in the 1330s, the bulk of the kingdom's profitable export trade in skins, hides, and most notably wool was routed through Edinburgh and its port of Leith. During Edward III's ill-fated Burnt Candlemas, invasion of Scotland, Edward and his army arrived at Edinburgh in early February and had much of the town burnt. By the middle of the 14th century, in the reign of David II, the French chronicler Froissart described the town of around 400 dwellings as "the Paris of Scotland" (c.1365 ). The Scottish king James II (1430–60) was "born, crowned, married and buried in the Abbey of Holyrood", and James III (1451–88) described Edinburgh in one of his charters as "the principal burgh of our kingdom" (principalior burgus regni nostri). By the reign of James V (1512–42) Edinburgh's assessment for taxation sometimes equalled the combined figures for the next three burghs in the kingdom; its proportion of total burgh taxation amounting to a fifth or a quarter and its total customs to a half or more. Despite wholesale destruction reported by contemporaries at the time of the Hertford Raid in 1544, the town slowly recovered with its population of merchant burgesses and craftsmen continuing to serve the needs of the royal court and nobility. Incorporated trades were cordiners (shoemakers), hatmakers, websters (weavers), hammermen (smiths and lorimers, i.e. leather workers), skinners, fleshers (butchers), coopers, wrights, masons, waulkers (fullers), tailors, barber-surgeons, baxters (bakers), and candlemakers. With the rise of taxes imposed by the burgh, some of these crafts relocated to suburbs beyond the town's boundary in the sixteenth and seventeenth centuries.

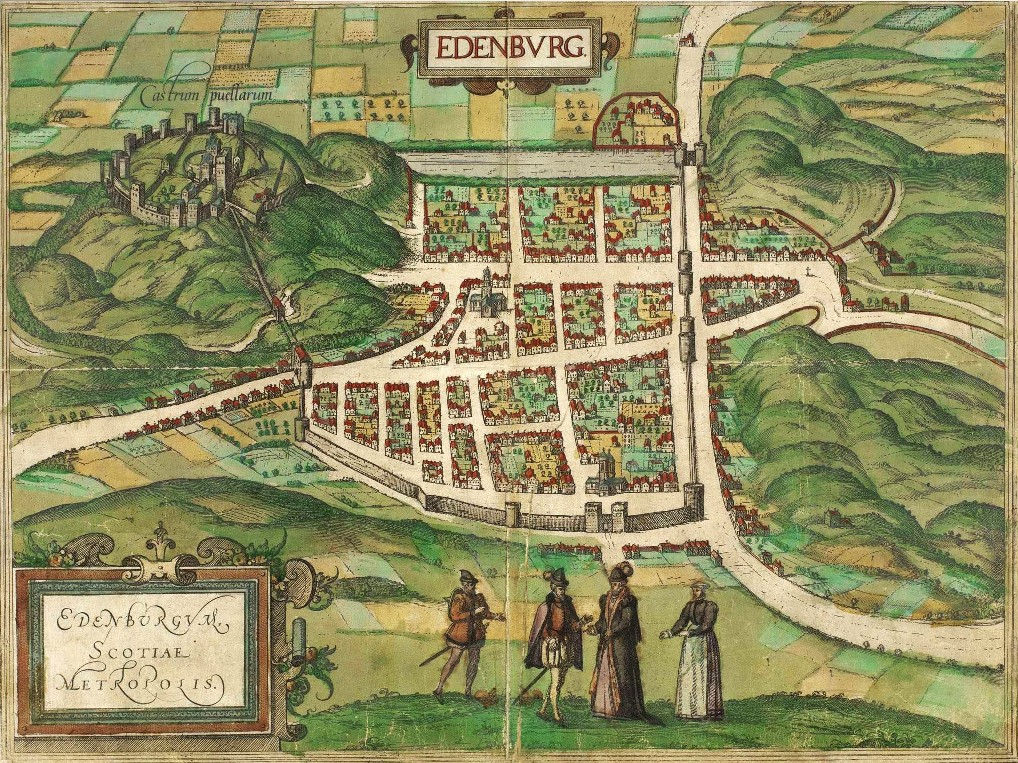
Edinburgh in the 16th century, as depicted in Braun & Hogenberg's Civitates orbis terrarum.

In 1560, at a time when Scotland's total population was an estimated one million people, Edinburgh's population reached 12,000, with another 4,000 in separate jurisdictions such as Canongate and the port of Leith. A parish census in 1592 recorded 8003 adults spread evenly south and north of the High Street; 45 per cent of the employed being domestic servants in the households of the legal and merchant professions or in town houses of the landed class Despite periodic outbreaks of plague with high death rates, most notably in 1568, 1584–88 and 1645, the population continued to grow steadily.

== Reformation era ==
The town played a central role in events leading to the establishment of Protestantism in the mid-16th century Scottish Reformation (see Siege of Leith). During her brief reign the Catholic Mary, Queen of Scots, who returned to Scotland from France in 1561, suffered from the deep discord that had been sown prior to her arrival. Protestant nobles and churchmen fearing that her personal faith and claim to the English throne, if successful, might lead eventually to a return to Catholicism remained implacably hostile to her rule. Although she was initially welcomed by the general population, the tragic chain of events that unfolded during her residence at Holyrood Palace, including the murders of her secretary David Rizzio and consort Henry Darnley, reached a crisis point which resulted in her forced abdication in 1567. Through his preaching at St. Giles calling for her execution as an adulteress and murderess one of the town's Protestant ministers John Knox inflamed popular opinion against Mary. After her arrest at Carberry she was detained briefly in the town provost's house on the present-day site of the Edinburgh City Chambers before being incarcerated in Lochleven Castle. The civil war that followed her escape from imprisonment, defeat at Langside and flight to England ended with the final surrender of her remaining loyal supporters in the "Lang Siege" of Edinburgh Castle in 1573.

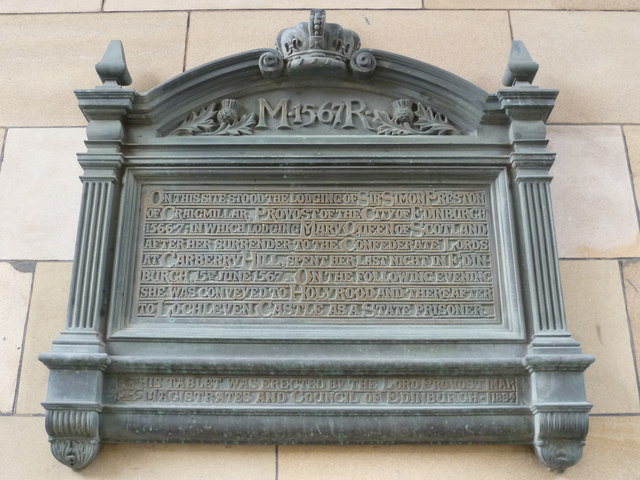
Stone tablet on the Edinburgh City Chambers where Mary, Queen of Scots spent her last night in the town

In 1579, Edinburgh's town council revived plans to establish a university, for which it had already sought–but not received–the approval of Mary. King James VI eventually agreed to found a college by royal charter, while earlier universities had been founded through papal bulls, further underlining Scotland's break with Catholicism. Philosophical and religious instruction at the institution which would eventually become the University of Edinburgh began in 1583.

The internal religious division within Scottish Protestantism, between Presbyterians and Episcopalians, continued into the 17th century, culminating in the Wars of the Covenant and the Wars of the Three Kingdoms, during which Edinburgh, as the seat of the Scottish Parliament with its Kirk-dominated Committee of Estates, figured prominently. The eventual triumph of Presbyterianism in 1689 determined the settled form of the Church of Scotland.

The Presbyterian establishment worked to purge the Episcopalians and heretics, and made blasphemy a capital crime. Thomas Aikenhead, the son of a surgeon in the city, aged 18, was indicted for blasphemy by order of the Privy Council for calling the New Testament "The History of the Imposter Christ"; he was hanged in 1696, the last person to be executed for heresy in Britain.

== Union of the Crowns to Parliamentary Union (17th century) ==
In 1603 King James VI of Scotland succeeded to the English throne, uniting the monarchies of Scotland and England in a regal union known as the Union of the Crowns. In all other respects Scotland remained a separate kingdom retaining the Parliament of Scotland in Edinburgh. King James VI moved to London where he held court, relying on a Privy Council to effect his rule in Scotland. Despite promising to return to his northern kingdom every three years, he returned only once, in 1617.

In the period 1550 to 1650, Edinburgh's town council was controlled by merchants despite efforts by the king's agents to manipulate it. The most important factors in obtaining the office were social status, followed by wealth; a person's religion made relatively little difference. Dingwall finds that 76% of the men inherited burgess status from their father or their father-in-law.

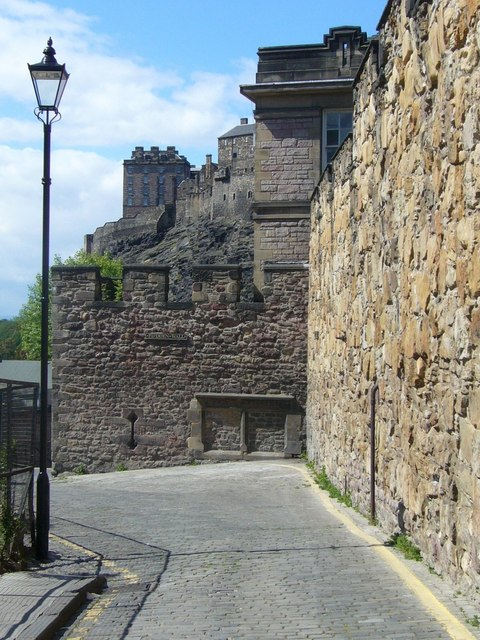
A surviving bastion of the Flodden Wall (ahead) with its 17th-century extension on the right

Stiff Presbyterian opposition to King Charles I's attempt to introduce Anglican forms of worship and church governance in the Church of Scotland culminated in the Bishops' Wars of 1639 and 1640, the initial conflicts in the civil war period. In 1650, following Scottish support for the restoration of Charles Stuart to the throne of England, Edinburgh was occupied by the Commonwealth forces of Oliver Cromwell after his victory at the Battle of Dunbar. An attempt by a predominantly royalist Scottish army to turn the tables on the Commonwealth by invading England in the following year failed when Cromwell inflicted a final defeat on the Scots at the Battle of Worcester.

Following the Battle of Dunbar, Cromwell installed General George Monck as his Commander-in-Chief in Scotland and a headquarters, The Citadal, was built in Leith. In 1654 at the Mercat Cross, acting on Cromwell's behalf, Monck proclaimed Cromwell to be the Protector of England, Ireland and Scotland and that Scotland was united with the Commonwealth of England. During the confusion which followed Oliver Cromwell's death on 3 September 1658, Monck remained silent and watchful at Edinburgh, careful only to secure his hold on his troops. At first he contemplated armed support of Richard Cromwell, but on realising the young man's incapacity for government, he gave up this idea and renewed his waiting policy. He then lead his troops south to London where he played a key role in the restoration of the monarchy.

In the 17th century, Edinburgh was still enclosed within the 140 acres of its "ancient royalty" by the defensive Flodden and Telfer Walls, built mainly in the 16th century as protection against possible English invasion. Due to the restricted land area available for development, houses increased in height to accommodate a growing population. Buildings of 11 stories were common; some, according to contemporary travellers' accounts, even taller, as high as 14 or even 15 stories. These have often been described by later commentators as precursors of the modern-day high-rise apartment block. Most of these old structures were later replaced by the predominantly Victorian buildings of the Old Town.

In 1706 and 1707, the Acts of Union were passed by the Parliaments of England and Scotland uniting the two kingdoms into the Kingdom of Great Britain. As a consequence, the Parliament of Scotland merged with the Parliament of England to form the Parliament of Great Britain, which sat only in London. The Union was opposed by many Scots at the time, resulting in riots within the city.

== 18th century ==
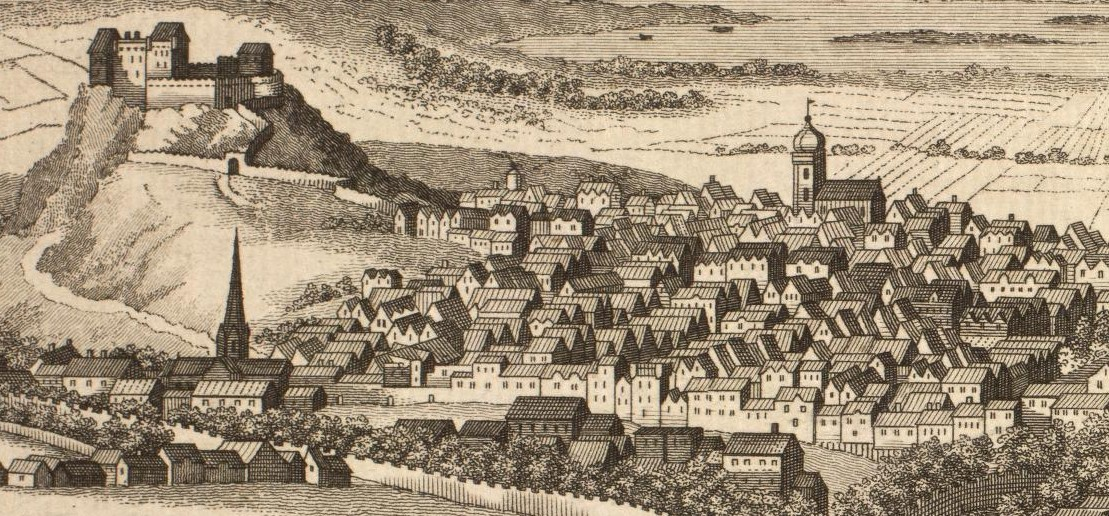
The 18thC castle and burgh

By the first half of the 18th century, rising prosperity was evidenced by the growth of the Bank of Scotland, Royal Bank of Scotland and British Linen Bank, all based in the city. However Edinburgh was one of the most densely populated, overcrowded and unsanitary towns in the whole of Europe. Daniel Defoe's remark was typical of many English visitors, "... though many cities have more people in them, yet, I believe, this may be said with truth, that in no city in the world [do] so many people live in so little room as at Edinburgh".

A striking characteristic of Edinburgh society in the 18th century, often remarked upon by visitors, was the close proximity and social interaction of the various social classes. Tradesmen and professionals shared the same buildings.

In the flats of the lofty houses in wynds or facing the High Street the populace dwelt, who reached their various lodgings by the steep and narrow 'scale' staircases [stair-towers] which were really upright streets. On the same building lived families of all grades and classes, each in its flat in the same stair—the sweep and caddie in the cellars, poor mechanics in the garrets, while in the intermediate stories might live a noble, a lord of session, a doctor or city minister, a dowager countess, or writer; higher up, over their heads, lived shopkeepers, dancing masters or clerks.

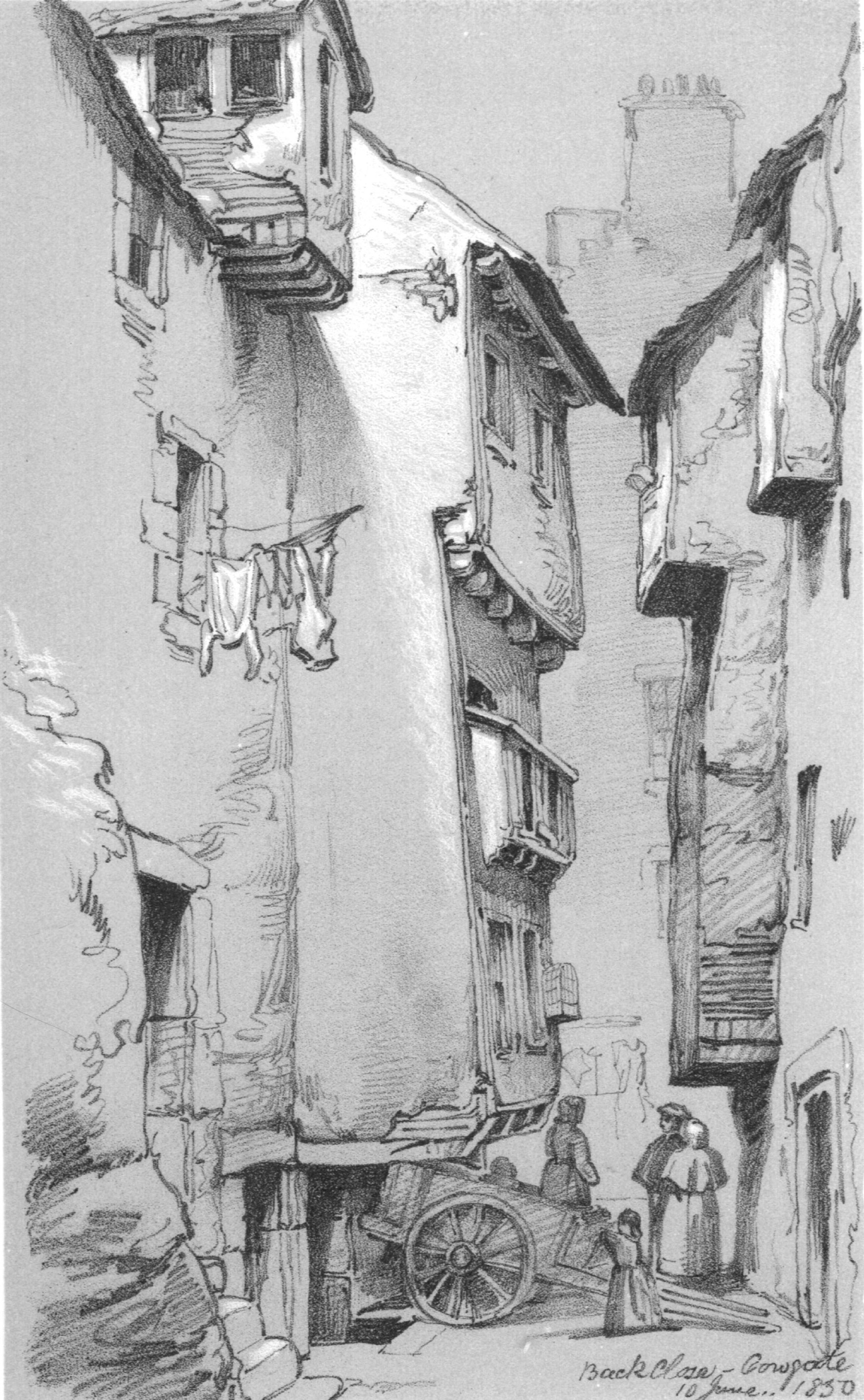
18thC Edinburgh was a warren of narrow closes (alleys) like this one drawn by James Drummond in 1850

One historian has ventured to suggest that Edinburgh's living arrangements may themselves have played a part in engendering the spirit of social inquiry associated with the thinkers of the Scottish Enlightenment: "Its tall lands (tenements) housed a cross-section of the entire society, nobles, judges and caddies rubbing shoulders with each other on the common stair. A man of inquiring mind could not live in old Edinburgh without becoming a sociologist of sorts."

During the Jacobite rising of 1745, Edinburgh was briefly occupied by the Jacobite "Highland Army" before its march into England. After its eventual defeat at Culloden, there followed a period of reprisals and pacification, largely directed at the rebellious clans. In Edinburgh, the Town Council, keen to emulate Georgian London, stimulate prosperity and re-affirm its belief in the Union, initiated city improvements and expansion north and south of the castle.

Although the idea of a northwards expansion had been first mooted around 1680, during the Duke of York's residence at Holyrood, the immediate catalyst for change was a decision by the Convention of Royal Burghs in 1752 to propose improvements to the capital for the benefit of commerce. The Convention issued a pamphlet entitled Proposals for carrying on certain Public Works in the City of Edinburgh, believed to have been authored by the classical scholar Sir Gilbert Elliot and heavily influenced by the ideas of Lord Provost George Drummond. Elliot described the existing town as follows,

Placed upon a ridge of a hill, it admits but of one good street, running from east to west, and even this is tolerably accessible only from one quarter. The narrow lanes leading to the north and south, by reason of their steepness, narrowness and dirtiness, can only be considered as so many unavoidable nuisances. Confined by the small compass of the walls, and the narrow limits of the royalty, which scarcely extends beyond the walls, the houses stand more crowded than in any other town in Europe, and are built to a height that is almost incredible.

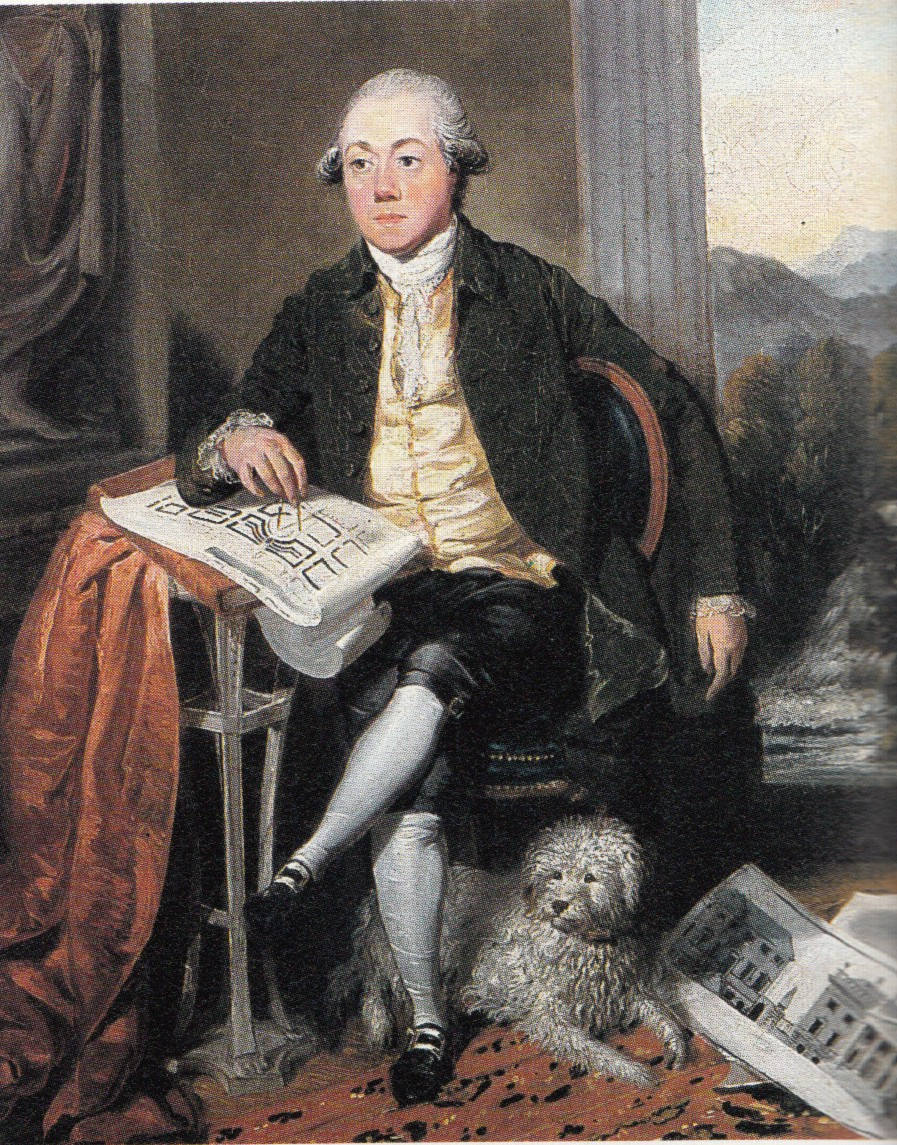
James Craig, the young architect who won the competition to design a plan for the New Town. Portrait by David Allan

The proposals for improvement envisaged the building of a new Exchange for merchants (now the City Chambers), new law courts and an advocates' library, expansion north and southwards, and the draining of the Nor Loch. As the New Town to the north took shape, the Town Council expressed its loyalty to the Union and the Hanoverian monarch George III in its choice of street names, for example, Rose Street and Thistle Street, and for the royal family: George Street, Queen Street, Hanover Street, Frederick Street and Princes Street (in honour of George's two sons). The profession of architect flourished, as did the prestige of builders, engineers, and surveyors. Some of the best known specialists in Edinburgh successfully brought their reputations to practice in London.

From the late-1760s onwards, the professional and business classes gradually deserted the Old Town in favour of the more desirable "one-family" residences of the New Town, with separate attic or basement accommodation for domestic servants. This migration changed the social character of Edinburgh, which Robert Chambers, writing in the 1820s, described as

a kind of double city—first, an ancient and picturesque hill-built one, occupied chiefly by the humbler classes; and second, an elegant modern one, of much regularity of aspect, and possessed almost as exclusively by the more refined portion of society.

According to Youngson, the foremost historian of this development, "Unity of social feeling was one of the most valuable heritages of old Edinburgh, and its disappearance was widely and properly lamented." The Old Town became an abode of the Poor. Observing conditions there in the 1770s, a widely travelled English visitor already reported that, "No people in the World undergo greater hardships, or live in a worse degree of wretchedness and poverty, than the lower classes here." From 1802 onwards a 'Second New Town' developed north of James Craig's original New Town.

== Scottish Enlightenment ==
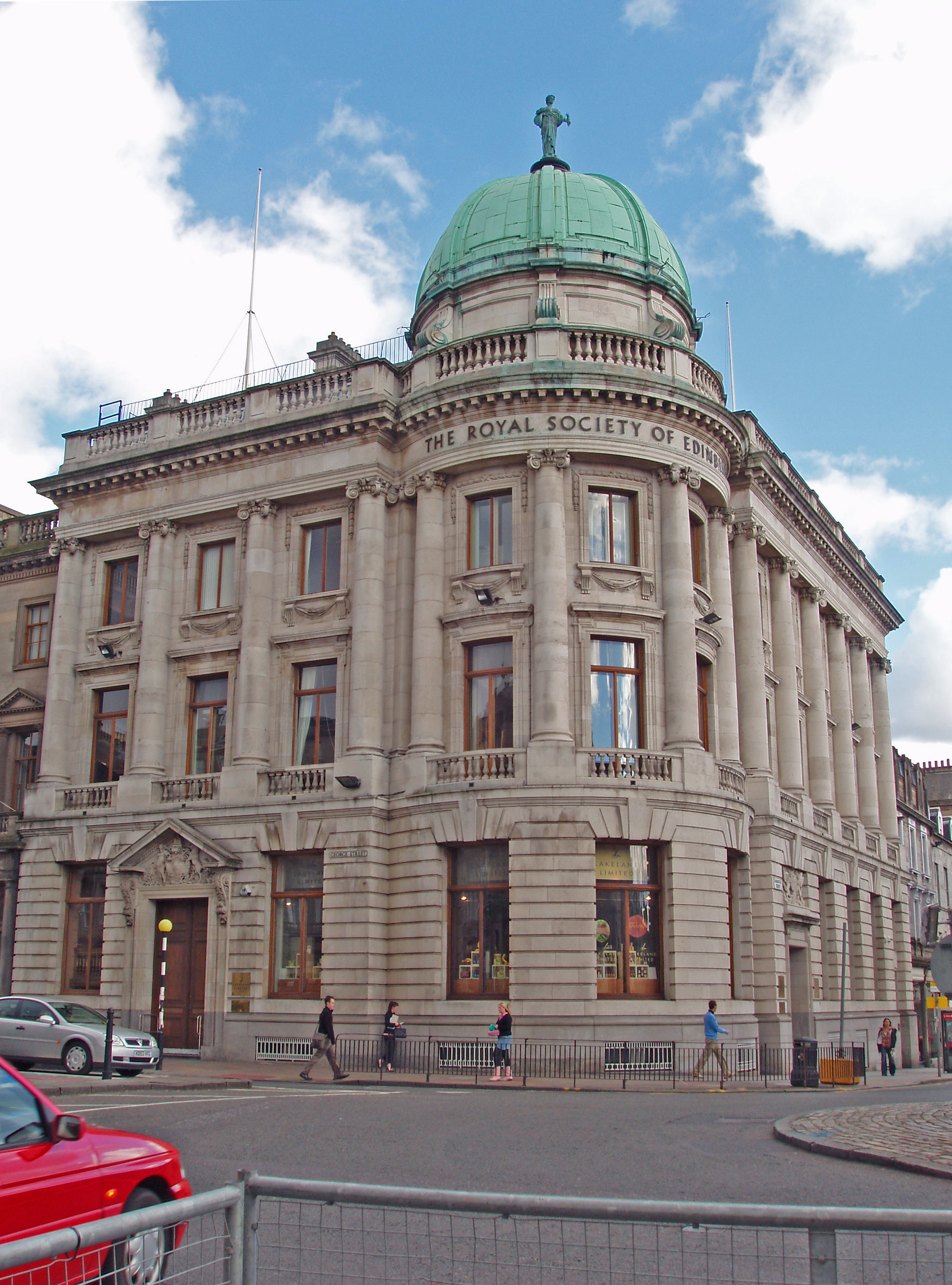
Home of the Royal Society of Edinburgh in George Street

Union with England in 1707 meant the end of the Scottish Parliament and saw members of parliament, aristocrats and placemen move to London. Scottish law, however, remained entirely separate from English law, with the result that the law courts and legal profession continued to exist in Edinburgh; as did the university and medical establishments. Lawyers, Presbyterian divines, professors, medical men and architects, formed a new intellectual middle-class elite that dominated the city and facilitated the Scottish Enlightenment.

From the late 1740s onwards, Edinburgh began to gain an international reputation as a centre of ideas, especially in philosophy, history, science, economics and medicine. The Faculty of Medicine at the University of Edinburgh, formed in 1726, soon attracted students from across Britain and the American colonies. Its chief sponsor was Archibald Campbell (1682–1761), 1st Earl of Islay, later 3rd Duke of Argyll, Scotland's most influential political leader. It served as a model for the medical school at the University of Pennsylvania in Philadelphia.

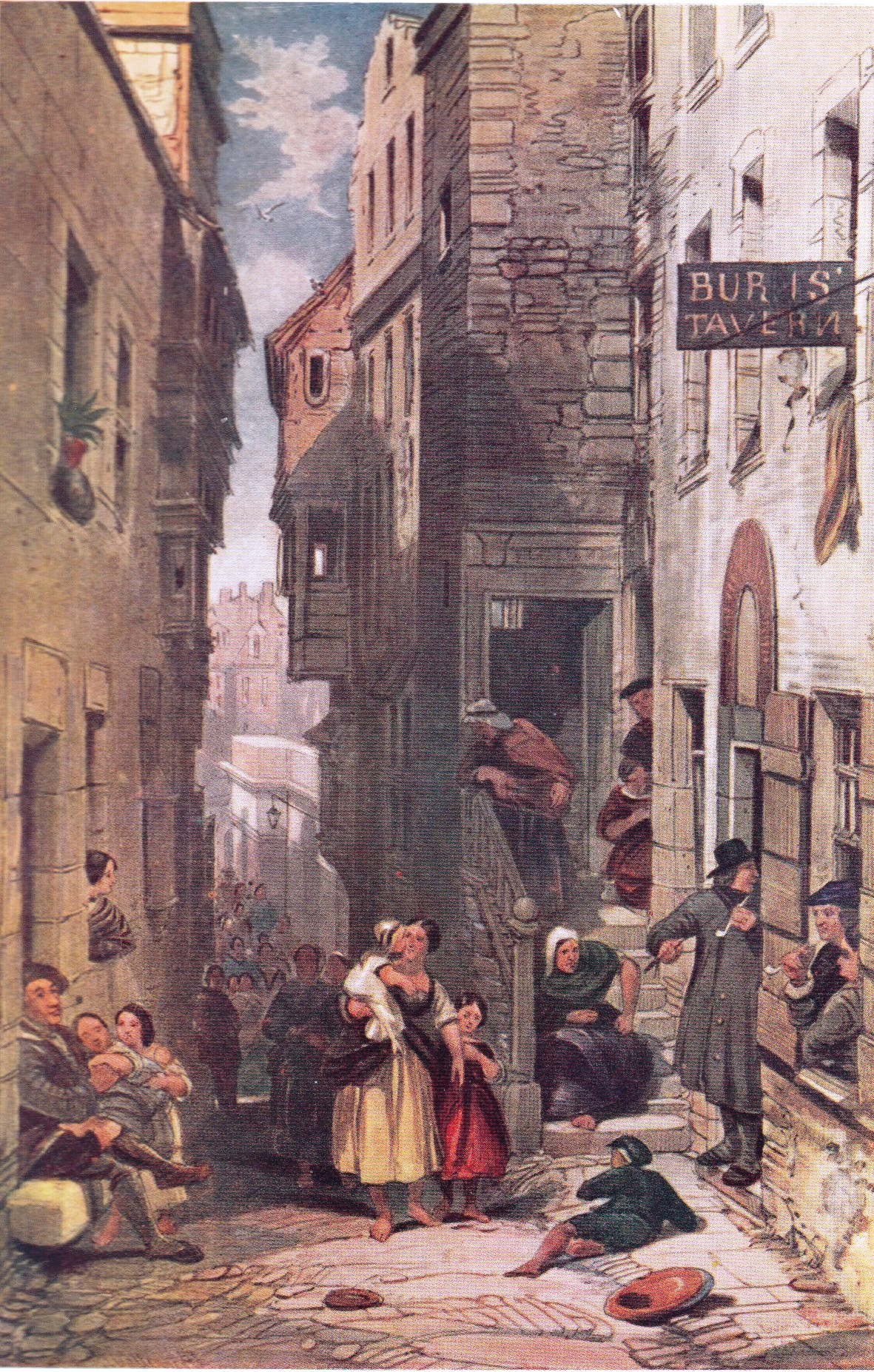
Painting showing, on the right, the entrance to John Dowie's tavern in Libberton's Wynd which was frequented by Enlightenment figures such as David Hume

Leading thinkers of the period included David Hume, Adam Smith, James Hutton, Joseph Black, John Playfair, William Robertson, Adam Ferguson, and jurists Lord Kames and Lord Monboddo. They often met for intense discussions at The Select Society and, later, The Poker Club. The Royal Society of Edinburgh, founded in 1783, became Scotland's national academy of science and letters. The historian Bruce Lenman states that their "central achievement was a new capacity to recognize and interpret social patterns."

The Edinburgh Musical Society was constituted in 1728 by well-to-do music lovers. They built St Cecilia's Hall in Niddry Street in 1763 as their private concert hall. They sponsored professional musicians and opened the concerts to their womenfolk. Flautist and composer Francesco Barsanti (1690–1772) was hired at a salary of £50. The Society had close links to the city's Masonic lodges; it was dissolved in 1797. An English visitor to the city, the poet Edward Topham, described Edinburgh's intense interest in music in 1775:

Indeed, the degree of attachment which is shewn to Music in general in this country, exceeds belief. It is not only the principal entertainment, but the constant topic of conversation; and it is necessary not only to be a lover of it, but to be possessed of a knowledge of the science to make yourself agreeable to society.

Influential visitors to Edinburgh included Benjamin Franklin of Philadelphia who came in 1759 and 1771 to meet with leading scientists and thinkers. Franklin, who was hosted by his close friend David Hume, concluded that the University possessed "a set of truly great men, Professors of Several Branches of Knowledge, as have ever appeared in any age or country." The novelist Smollett had one of his characters in The Expedition of Humphry Clinker describe the city as a "hotbed of genius". Thomas Jefferson, writing to the philosopher Dugald Stewart in June 1789, declared that, as far as science was concerned, "no place in the world can pretend to a competition with Edinburgh".

Representative of the far-reaching impact of the Scottish Enlightenment was the new Encyclopædia Britannica, which was designed in Edinburgh by Colin Macfarquhar, Andrew Bell and others. It was first published in three volumes between 1768 and 1771, with 2,659 pages and 160 engravings, and quickly became a standard reference work in the English-speaking world. The fourth edition (1810) ran to 16,000 pages in 20 volumes. The Encyclopaedia continued to be published in Edinburgh until it was sold to an American publisher in 1898. The Edinburgh Review, founded in 1802, became one of the most influential intellectual magazines of 19th-century Britain (its publication continued to 1929). Under its famous editor Francis Jeffrey (1773–1850) it promoted Romanticism and Whig politics.

From around 1820 the city acquired its soubriquets "Modern Athens" and "Athens of the North" because of a perceived similarity in topography, the neo-classical architecture of its new public buildings and New Town, and not least its reputation as an intellectual centre.

== 19th century ==
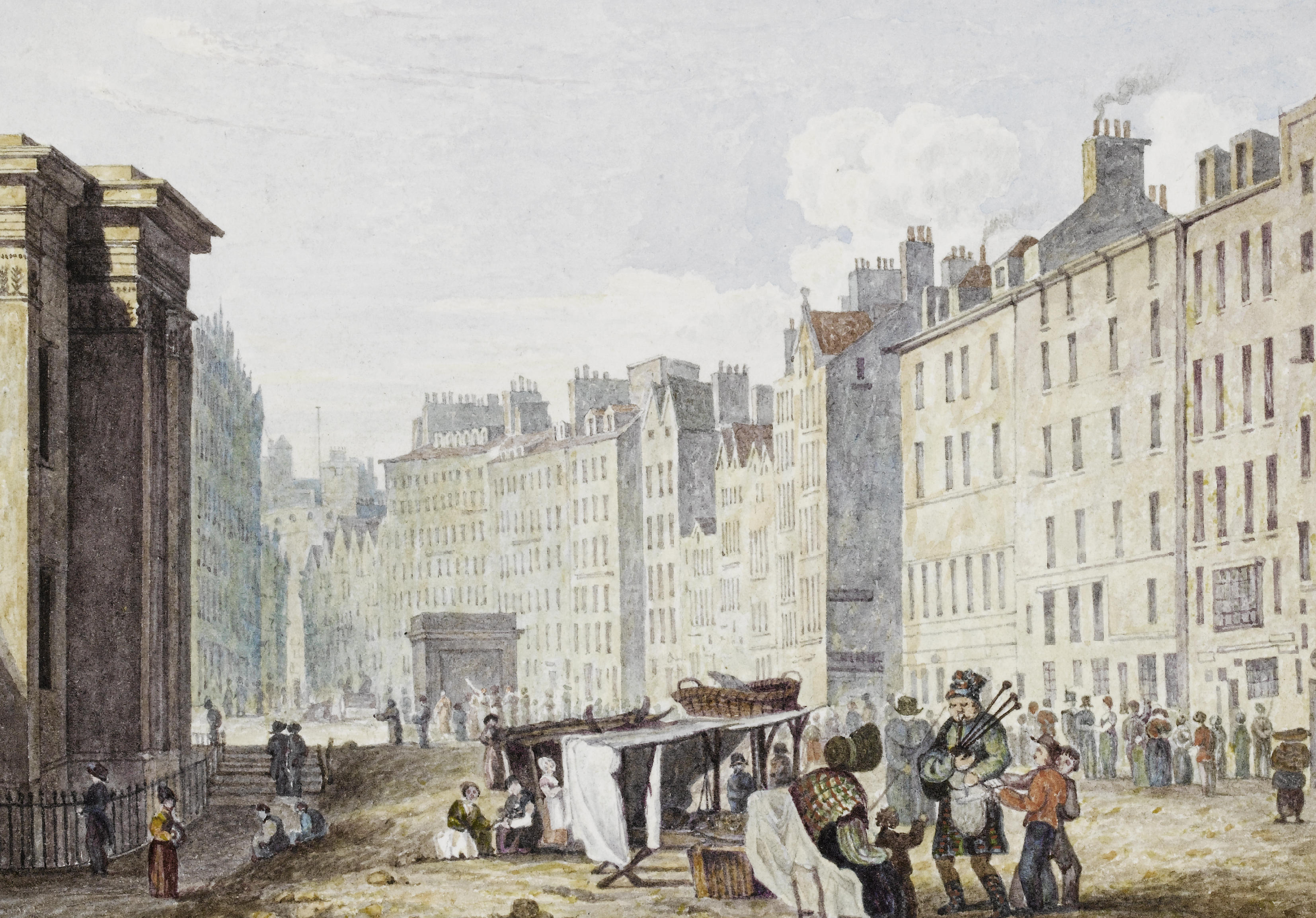
View of the Lawnmarket, 1827

Although Edinburgh's traditional industries of printing, brewing and distilling continued to grow in the 19th century and were joined by new firms in rubber, engineering, and pharmaceuticals, there was little industrialisation compared with other cities in Britain. By 1821, Edinburgh had been overtaken by Glasgow as Scotland's largest city. Glasgow had benefited initially from the Atlantic trade with North America, and now became a major manufacturing centre of the British Empire. Edinburgh's city centre between Princes Street and George Street became a predominantly commercial and shopping district, sweeping away most of the original Georgian architecture of that part of the New Town. This development was partly stimulated by the advent of railways penetrating the city centre from east and west in the 1840s.

In the meantime the Old Town continued to decay into an increasingly dilapidated, overcrowded slum with high mortality rates, and was practically segregated socially from the rest of the city. This was especially true where the sub-division of tenements offered the cheapest lodgings in narrow alleyways that formed the backdrop to the infamous 'West Port Murders' of Burke and Hare. In 1865 Alexander Smith wrote of one of the poorest districts,

The Cowgate is the Irish portion of the city. Edinburgh leaps over it with bridges: the inhabitants are morally and geographically the lower orders. They keep to their own quarters, and seldom come up to the light of day. Many an Edinburgh man has never set his foot in the street: the condition of the inhabitants is as little known to respectable Edinburgh as are the habits of moles, earth worms and the mining population. The people of the Cowgate seldom visit the upper streets.

Edinburgh Improvement Act 1867
- Act of Parliament
- Parliament of the United Kingdom
- Long title: An Act for the Improvement of the City of Edinburgh, and constructing new, and widening, altering, improving, and diverting existing Streets in the said City; and for other Purposes.
- Citation: 30 & 31 Vict. c. xliv

Dates
- Royal assent: 31 May 1867

Text of statute as originally enacted

Following the publication of Dr. Henry Littlejohn's Report on the Sanitary Conditions of the City of Edinburgh in 1865, major street improvements were carried out in the Old Town under Lord Provost William Chambers, and the Edinburgh Improvement Act 1867 (30 & 31 Vict. c. xliv) initiated the transformation of the area into the predominantly Victorian Old Town seen today. In contrast to the New Town many of the buildings are in the architectural style known as Scots Baronial, which has been described as a particularly Scottish contribution to the Gothic Revival in keeping with the perceived "medieval" character of the Old Town. Slum clearance brought about a fall in the death rate, but the lack of new inexpensive housing led to other poor districts becoming more overcrowded and degenerating into slums. The experience demonstrated to reformers that future projects had to include cheap new housing.

In the intellectual sphere, from 1832 to 1844, Chambers's Edinburgh Journal was the most read periodical in Britain, with a circulation over 80,000. Edited by the Chambers brothers, Robert and William, it applied the philosophy of utilitarianism to practical issues. The articles examined a wide range of social problems including poverty, alcoholism, illiteracy, sanitation, working conditions, crime, and mental illness.

== 20th century ==
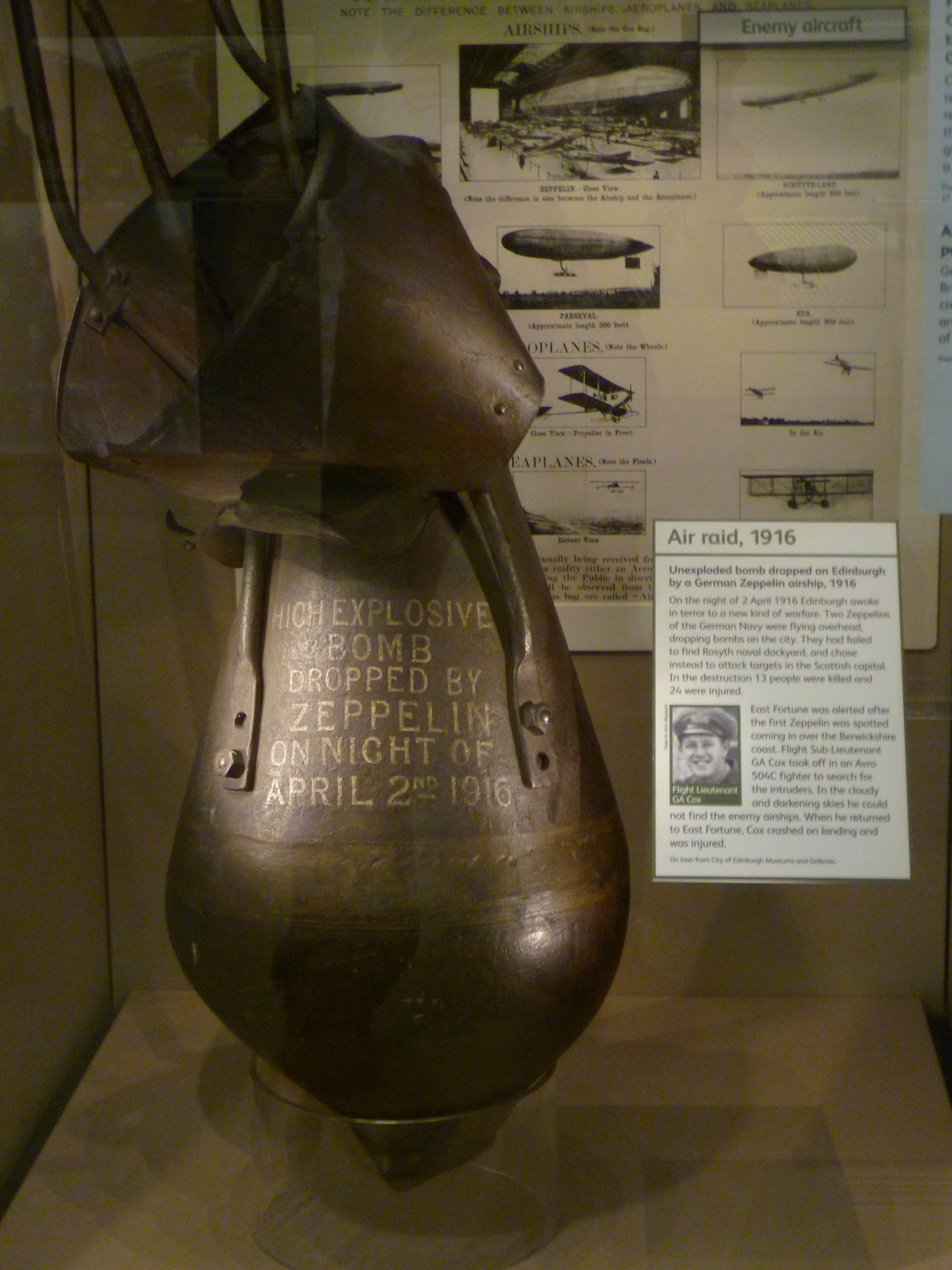
Unexploded bomb found after the Zeppelin raid of April 1916

During the First World War, Edinburgh was bombed on the night of 2–3 April 1916. Two German Zeppelins dropped high explosive and incendiary bombs on, among other places, Leith, the Mound, Lothian Road, the Castle Rock and the Grassmarket. Eleven civilian deaths, numerous injuries and property damage resulted.

Owing to its comparative lack of industry, Edinburgh was not targeted as part of the German bombing campaign against British cities in the early part of the Second World War. The Port of Leith was hit on 22 July 1940 when a 1000 lb bomb fell on the Albert Dock, though it is unclear whether the originally intended target had been the well-defended Rosyth Dockyard. Bombs were dropped on at least 11 other occasions between June 1940 and July 1942 in what appear to have been opportunistic attacks by bombers jettisoning their remaining load while returning from the main target (e.g. Clydebank or Belfast). The city therefore escaped major loss of life and damage during the war and emerged from it almost completely unscathed.

The tight-knit Irish Catholic community, which resulted from a steady influx of Irish immigrants in the previous century, formed a distinctive subculture in the city. Seán Damer recalls growing up in the 1940s and 1950s in working-class Irish Catholic neighbourhoods. He describes a Catholic culture surrounded by Protestant animosity and excluded from power. It was characterized by social introversion, conformity, and ritual, as well as "a marked restriction of intellectual, cultural, and political horizons."

More piecemeal improvements to the Old Town followed in the early 20th century at the instigation of the pioneering town planner Patrick Geddes, who described his work as "conservative surgery", but a period of relative economic stagnation through the two world wars and their aftermaths saw its fabric deteriorate further before major slum clearance in the 1960s and 1970s began to reverse the process. Even so, its population dropped by over two-thirds (to 3,000) between 1950 and 1975; and of 292 houses in the Cowgate in 1920 only eight remained in 1980. In the mid-1960s, the working-class area of Dumbiedykes was swept away almost overnight and the George Square area, which represented the major part of the city's original southwards expansion in the 18th century, fell victim to new University building developments. The mediaeval suburb of Potterrow, which lay outside the town walls and had been rebuilt in the Victorian period, was obliterated in the process. By the late 1960s, such developments perceived by many as unsympathetic to the historical character of the city, together with the further remodelling of sections of Princes Street, prompted the eminent historian Christopher Smout to urge its citizens "to save the New Town from the vandalism of neglect and development carried on today with the consent of the present council, whose crocodile tears and pretty exhibitions do nothing at all to stop the builders' rape of the capital".

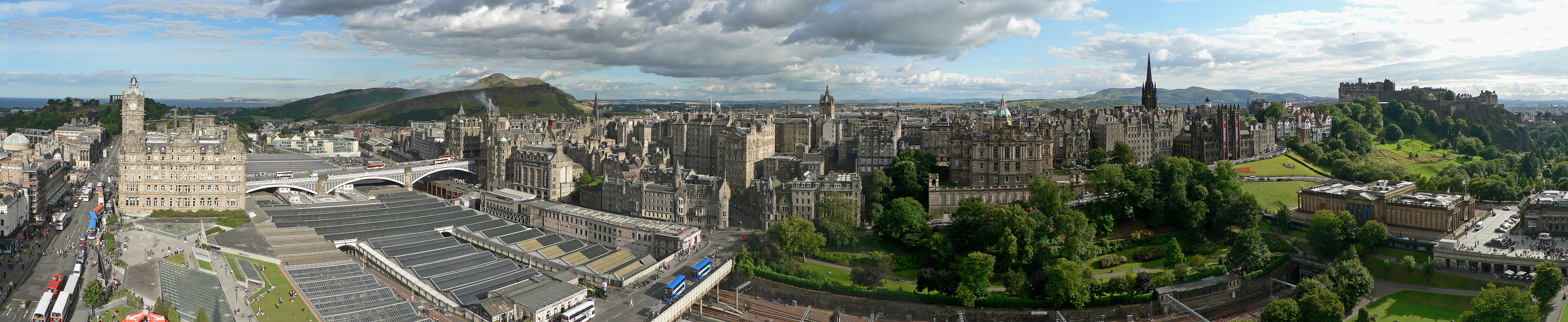
Panorama of Edinburgh, seen from the Scott Monument

== Recent developments ==
Since the 1990s a new "financial district", including a new Edinburgh International Conference Centre, has grown mainly on demolished railway property to the west of the castle, stretching into Fountainbridge, a run-down 19th-century industrial suburb which has undergone radical change since the 1980s with the demise of industrial and brewery premises. This ongoing development has enabled Edinburgh District to maintain its place as the second largest financial and administrative centre in the United Kingdom after London. Financial services now account for a third of all commercial office space in the city. The development of Edinburgh Park, a new business and technology park covering 38 acres, 4 miles west of the city centre, has also been a key element in the District Council's strategy for the city's economic regeneration.

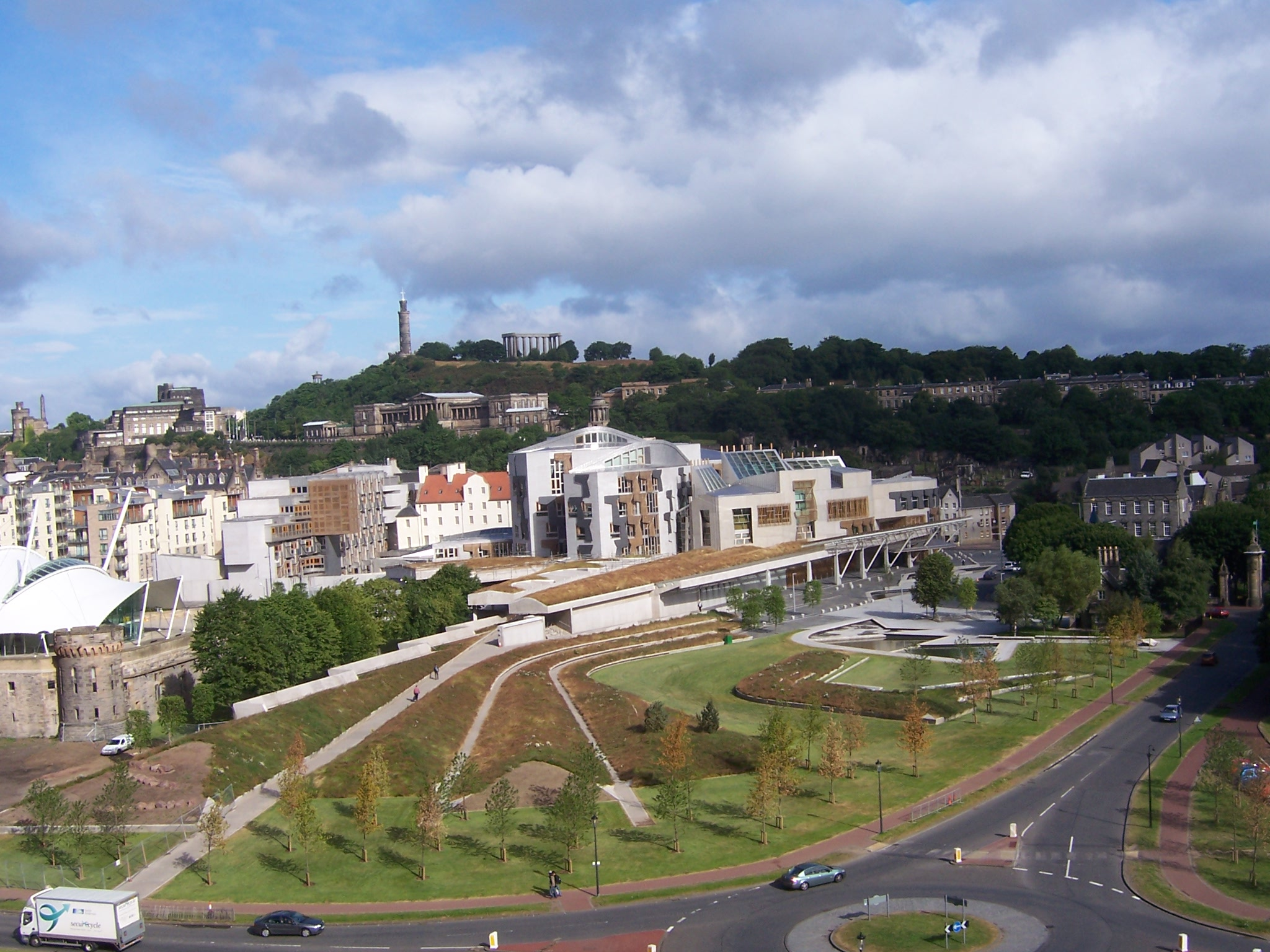
The Scottish Parliament Building with Calton Hill in the background

In 1998, the Scotland Act, which came into force the following year, established a devolved Scottish Parliament and Scottish Executive (renamed the Scottish Government since September 2007). Both based in Edinburgh, they are responsible for governing Scotland while reserved matters such as defence, taxation and foreign affairs remain the responsibility of the Westminster Parliament in London.

== See also ==
- Timeline of Edinburgh history
- Edinburgh Castle
- Scottish Enlightenment
- Great Fire of Edinburgh (1824)
