= Walsall Manor Hospital =

- Walsall Healthcare NHS Trust
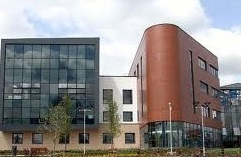
- Walsall Manor Hospital

- Location within West Midlands

Geography
- Location: Walsall, West Midlands, England, United Kingdom
- Coordinates: 52.582726°N 2.00047°W

Organisation
- Care system: Public NHS
- Type: Acute hospital

Services
- Beds: 550

History
- Founded: 1896

Links
- Lists: Hospitals in England

Walsall Manor Hospital is an acute general hospital in Walsall, West Midlands managed by the Walsall Healthcare NHS Trust.

== History ==
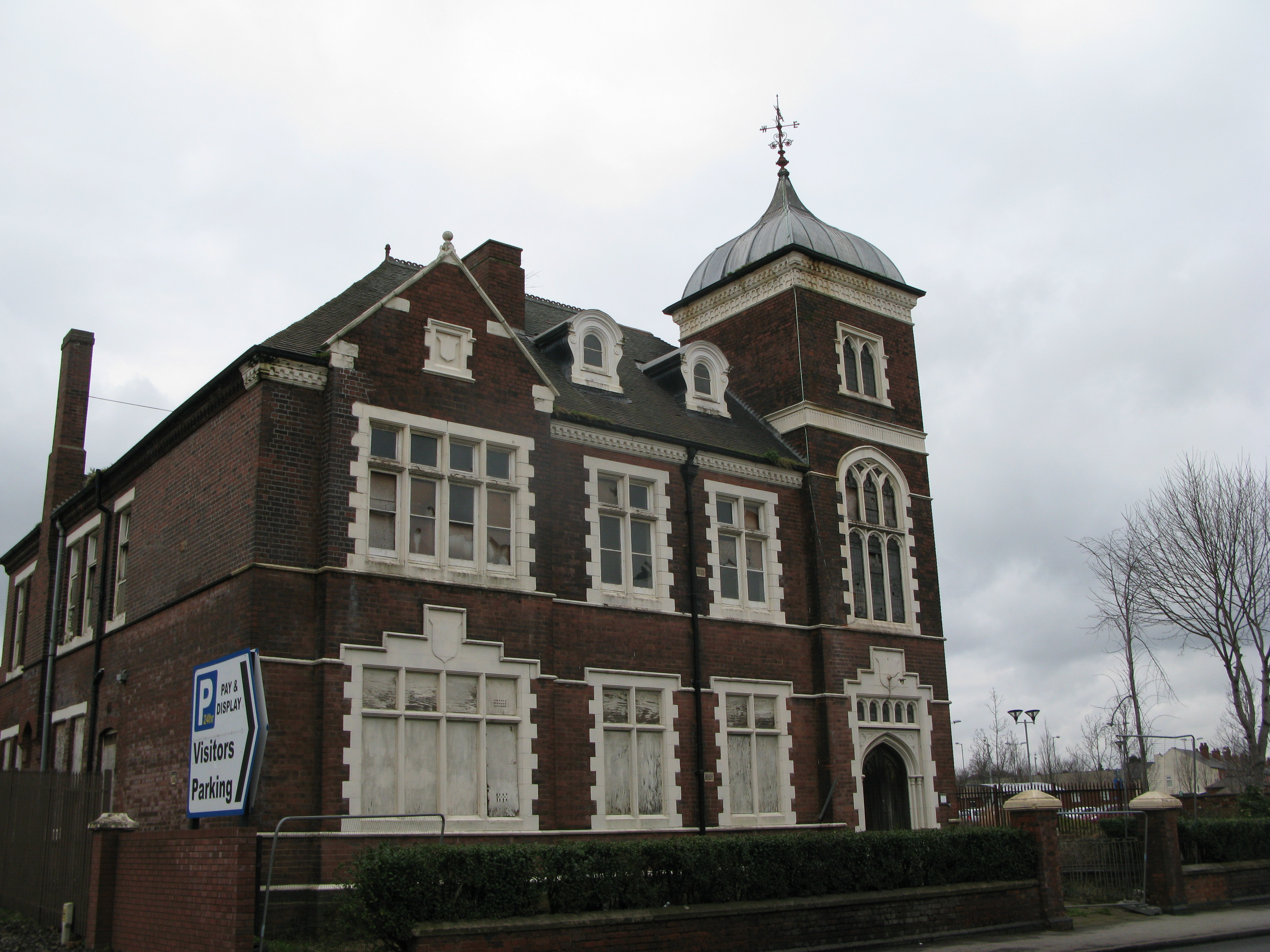
The old hospital

The hospital has its origins in an infirmary built for the Central Union Workhouse in 1896; the car park is on the site of Walsall Castle, a 12th/13th-15th century moated manor house. After becoming the Manor Hospital in 1928, it expanded through conversion for clinical use of an old nurses' block in the 1930s and of an old recreational hall in the 1960s. A new geriatric block was opened in 1973 and the West Wing was opened by Princess Diana in 1991.

A redevelopment of the site was procured under a Private Finance Initiative contract in 2007. The works, which were designed by Steffian Bradley and carried out by Skanska at a cost of £174 million, were completed in 2010.

A new "dementia friendly" ward opened in May 2015 and a transitional care unit for new-born babies opened at the hospital in February 2017.

A new Emergency Department, constructed by Tilbury Douglas was completed in March 2023.

== See also ==
- Walsall Integrated Sexual Health Services
- Healthcare in West Midlands
- List of hospitals in England
