= Baron Basset of Drayton =

Extinct barony in the Peerage of England

Baron Basset of Drayton of Drayton in the county of Stafford was a title in the Peerage of England.

The barony was created in 1264 for Ralph Basset (died 1265) of Drayton by writ of summons to Simon de Monfort's parliament. Ralph was killed in the Battle of Evesham with de Montfort's forces in 1265, less than a year later. His lands and titles were forfeit due to his rebellion but his lands were restored to his widow Margaret as she was the daughter of Roger de Somery II who was a royalist.

The first Ralph's son, also called Ralph (born before 1265, died 1299) became baron in 1295. Some records consider that the barony was a restoration whereas others see it as a new creation. Depending on the position taken, either the Ralph who died in 1265 or the one who died in 1299 is counted as the first baron. De Montfort's summons's and appointments, though debated, were upheld by the English courts in the 19th century, but, when challenged again, were declared invalid in the early 20th century.

The 2nd baron was succeeded in the barony by his grandson, Ralph, the son of Ralph (died 1335), who predeceased him. The 3rd baron died in 1390, "when the Barony became dormant, or, possibly, fell into abeyance between the heirs of his two great aunts."

== Barons Basset of Drayton ==
- Ralph Basset, 1st Baron Basset of Drayton (before 1265–1299)
- Ralph Basset, 2nd Baron Basset of Drayton (died 1343)
- Ralph Basset, 3rd Baron Basset of Drayton (1335–1390)
