= Walsall Integrated Sexual Health Services =

- Walsall Healthcare NHS Trust

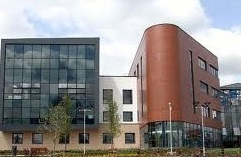
- Walsall Manor Hospital

Geography
- Location: Walsall, West Midlands, United Kingdom

Links
- Website: http://www.walsallsexualhealth.co.uk/
- Lists: Hospitals in the United Kingdom

Walsall Integrated Sexual Health Services (WiSH) is a part of the UK National Health Service that provides sexual healthcare in the Walsall area of the UK. The services include the treatment and prevention of sexually transmitted infections, contraception and participation in the National Chlamydia Screening Programme. All services are free and confidential and are available to UK and European Community nationals regardless of age. Since 1 April 2013, Walsall Council (the Local Authority) has been responsible for commissioning the service as part of their public health responsibilities. The funding comes from their allocated public health grant from the UK government.

The service operates from The Centre for Sexual Health at Walsall Manor Hospital. An internet based postal-testing service is also available.
