= Walsall Healthcare NHS Trust =

NHS hospital trust

- Former name: Walsall Hospital NHS Trust
- Type: NHS hospital trust
- Hospitals: Walsall Manor Hospital
- Chair: Steve Field
- Chief executive: Daren Fradgley
- Staff: 4,400
- Website: www.walsallhealthcare.nhs.uk

The Walsall Healthcare NHS Trust is a public sector healthcare provider in Walsall, West Midlands, England. It originated as Walsall Hospital NHS Trust in December 1990, and was renamed in April 2011 after a merger by acquisition of the Walsall Community Health NHS Trust. It runs Walsall Manor Hospital and provides community services in Walsall.

In December 2020 it agreed to appoint a joint chair with Royal Wolverhampton NHS Trust, anticipating plans to form a group model across the sustainability and transformation partnership.

== Development ==
In November 2013 the Trust announced that it needed a new A&E department, intensive care unit and expansion of maternity services to deal with rising demand, on top of the £170 million redevelopment completed in 2010.

The Trust's board meeting in May 2014 noted it had been forced to "recruit 25 additional staff" to address "a number of issues [which] have arisen as their Lorenzo patient record systems move to business as usual", including "backlogs, clinic restructuring and un-outcomed outpatient clinic forms". [sic] Problems with Lorenzo were said to have contributed to a 15% reduction in outpatient activity. At the same time, the Trust had a 25% increase in emergency admissions, related to problems at nearby Stafford Hospital. It predicts a £9 million deficit for 2014/5.

It agreed in July 2015 to join the Black Country Alliance with Dudley Group NHS Foundation Trust and Sandwell and West Birmingham Hospitals NHS Trust. The plan was to create a jointly owned Company Limited by Guarantee which would enable the three trusts to jointly bid for contracts. There would also be some consolidation of administrative functions such as payroll, information technology, and estates.

The trust has an apprenticeship scheme for healthcare assistants with 128 participants. It was rated inadequate by OFSTED in January 2019.

== Performance ==
In October 2012 71-year-old Harry Riley fell from a first-floor window at the hospital and later died. The Trust was prosecuted by the Health and Safety Executive and fined £80,000.

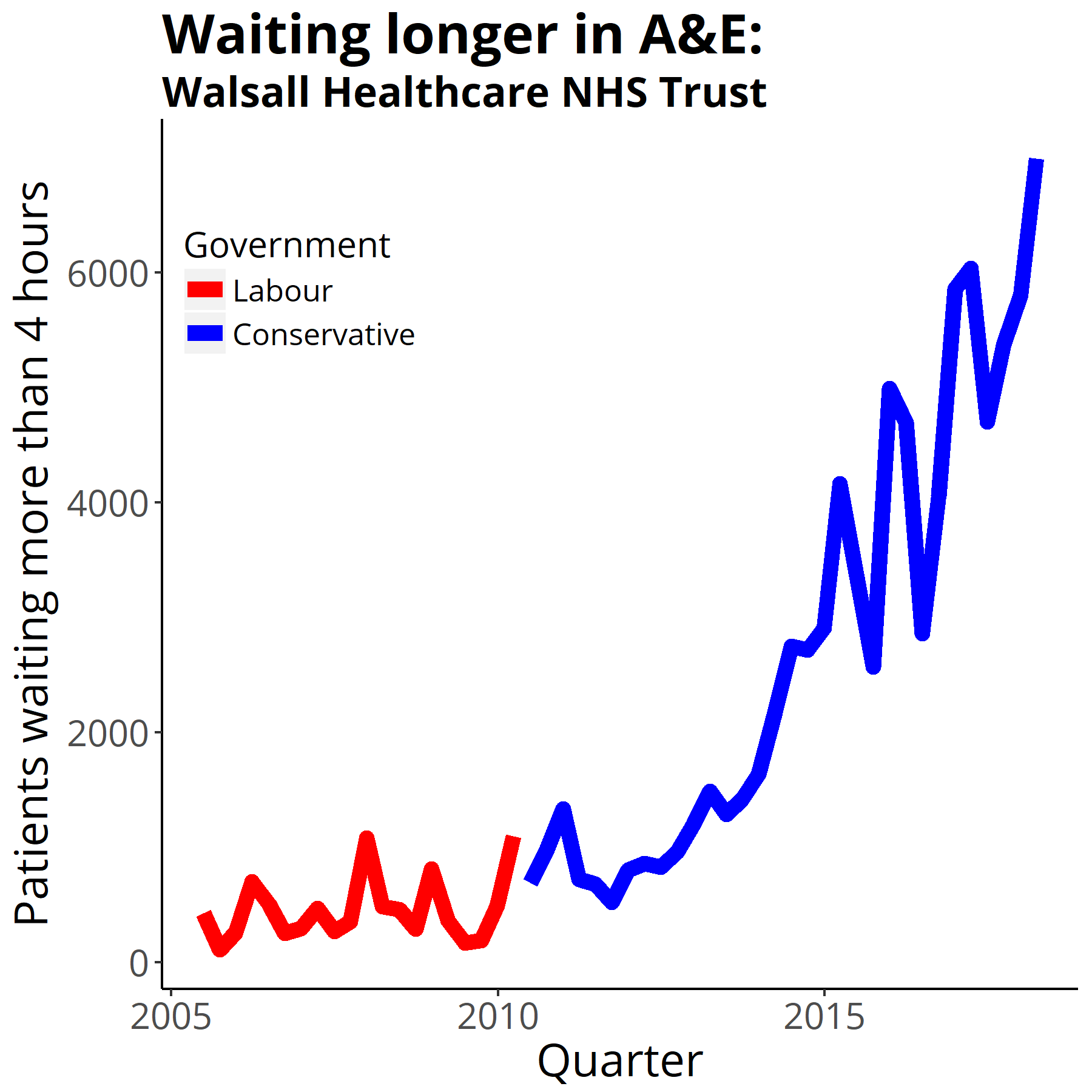
Walsall Healthcare NHS Trust A&E performance 2005-18

The trust was one of 26 responsible for half of the national growth in patients waiting more than four hours in accident and emergency over the 2014/5 winter.

In 2015, the trust did not submit its data for national reporting because of problems with its computer system, but its own “benchmarking” would have ranked it 130 out of 130 in the country for treating referred patients within 18 weeks in December 2015.

== Drew v Walsall Healthcare NHS Trust ==
The trust was the defendant in the legal case of Drew v Walsall Healthcare NHS Trust [2013] UKEAT 0378_12_2009 (20 September 2013). Dr David Drew, a paediatric consultant, claimed that he was unfairly dismissed. The Trust had told him that he "should refrain from any religious references in his professional communications". He refused to accept this instruction and was dismissed. He claimed that he had been discriminated against on religious grounds. The Employment Tribunal and the Employment Appeal Tribunal dismissed his claim.

== See also ==
- List of hospitals in England
- List of NHS trusts
