= Sapcote =

Village in Leicestershire, England

Coordinates: 52.53447°N 1.27905°W

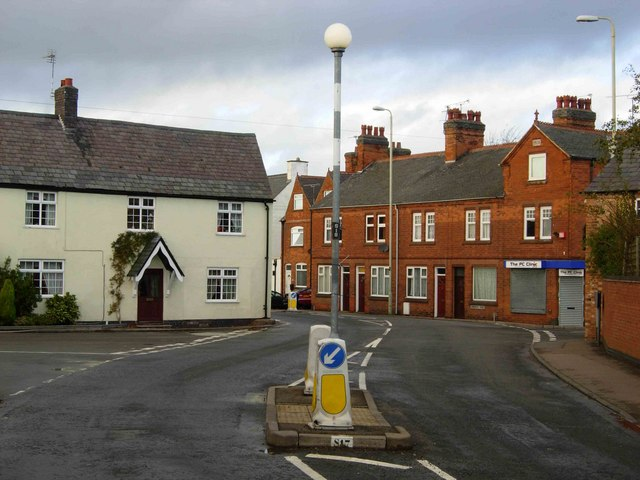

- Location within Leicestershire
- Population: 3,260 (2021)
- OS grid reference: SP490932
- District: Blaby
- Shire county: Leicestershire
- Region: East Midlands
- Country: England
- Sovereign state: United Kingdom
- Post town: Leicester
- Postcode district: LE9
- Dialling code: 01455
- Police: Leicestershire
- Fire: Leicestershire
- Ambulance: East Midlands
- UK Parliament: South Leicestershire

Sapcote is a small village in south-west Leicestershire, England, in the Sparkenhoe Hundred. It has a population of approximately 3,260, measured at the 2021 census The well-known inland scuba diving site Stoney Cove is nearby.

== History ==
An early Bronze Age occupation site has been discovered here.

The Roman occupation of the site, in the hinterland of the major Roman centre at Leicester (Ratae Corieltauvorum), was associated with the Fosse Way which passed close by, not far from its crossing with the Watling Street. It was centred upon a Roman villa with mosaic pavements and bath house, occupied continuously during the 2nd and 3rd centuries AD. Related sites in the district were at Mancetter, Barwell and Hinckley.

The continuous occupation of the existing settlement had its origins in the Anglo-Saxon period, and lay within that province of the Middle Angles, centred in Leicestershire, the rule of which was granted by Penda of Mercia to his son Peada in AD 653. At that time Christian missionaries, led by Diuma, came into Peada's kingdom from Northumbria. A 7th-century gold necklace pendant enclosing a large shield-shaped garnet, found at Sapcote in 2003, belonged to a person of social importance of that time. Sapcote took its name before the Norman Conquest, and was mentioned in the Domesday Book, as Scepecote. This represented the Anglo-Saxon Scēapcot = "shed or enclosure for sheep".

The Church of Sapcote is dedicated to All Saints. In 1188 William Basset was the patron of the living and the first rector recorded was Thomas Spencer in 1220. Under Norman rule, from the 12th-14th century Sapcote became a seat of the powerful Basset family, descendants of the royal justice Ralph Basset (died 1127), who held the neighbouring manor of Stoney Stanton. Ralph de Basset (died 1282) was High Sheriff of England and, possibly, the first Member of Parliament, being the first Lord to be called to the Barons Parliament by Simon de Montfort. Nichols refers to the site of a castle of the Bassets having been on a slight eminence in the village, which was levelled-off during the 18th century.

After the Reformation the lordship of Sapcote was successively in the Ferrers, Grey and Tufton families. During the 19th century the main occupations of the villagers were frame-work knitting (hosiery) and quarrying.

== Buildings ==
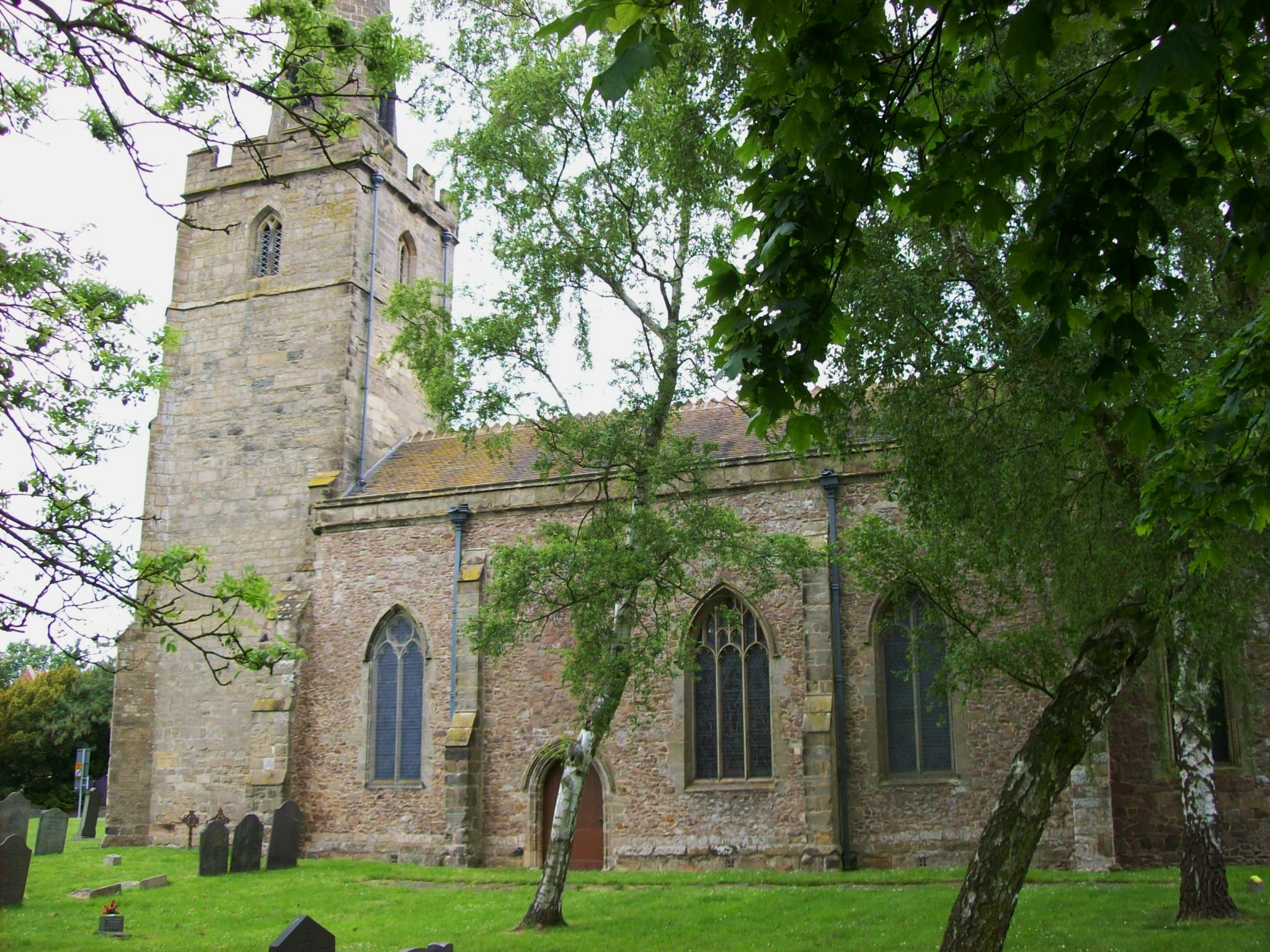
Sapcote Parish Church

The oldest surviving building in the village is the Church of England parish church of All Saints, a building in English Decorated and Perpendicular architectural styles of the 13th to 15th centuries. The Norman font is all that remains of an earlier church: William Bassett appears as the patron of rector Thomas in the last decades of the 12th century. A chantry was established by Ralph de Basset in 1376 and its chapel forms the present north aisle. At one time the church windows had the Basset coat of arms and devices in glass, but those of the chancel window were removed in 1788, and only a fragment now remains. At this time a stone coffin, probably of one of the Bassetts, was opened and re-interred.

The Wesleyans built their first church in Sapcote in 1805. This was a successful and active congregation. The Sapcote Wesleyan Band of Hope, a Temperance group in the Hinckley circuit, was flourishing in 1880 with some 65 members. In 1902 a square stone-built church was erected. The stone was quarried by the men of the church and they made such a good job of it that the church remains as one of the best buildings in Sapcote. It opened in 1905 and is a fine example of the Arts and Crafts period.

In 1806 a bath house was built by John Frewen-Turner over the so-called Golden Well in Stanton Road, in an attempt to establish a spa at Sapcote. In the building were cold and warm baths, and treatment was given for nervous, rheumatic and scrofulous complaints. The building cost around £600: the beneficial effects of the waters were much approved by Robert Chessher of Hinckley, and Prime Ministers George Canning and the Duke of Wellington visited the baths.

Other historical buildings include several thatched cottages, Park Farm (a timber-framed house dated 1683 in Stanton Road), the Old School in Leicester Road which was built in 1819, and the Revd. Stanley Burrough's Almshouses in Cooke's Lane, erected by Thomas Frewen in 1847 in Tudor revival style. (Stanley Burrough was Rector of Sapcote from 1779 to 1807).

== People ==
Robert Bickersteth, later Bishop of Ripon, for some years was curate to his father as Rector at Sapcote. The life of the village is recorded in various memoirs.

For many years Sapcote was home to the actor Bill Maynard, familiar to the television-viewing public as Selwyn Froggitt and as Claude Greengrass in Heartbeat. Maynard had the initial idea for Oh No It's Selwyn Froggitt, wishing to create a sitcom based around the members of the working men's club in his home village. He later said "every character came from that club". Maynard modelled his lead character on Peter Wright, who often exclaimed "magic!" with his thumbs up and ordered "a pint of cooking and a bag of nuts", both of which would become catchphrases of Maynard's character. Maynard later commented "you couldn't dream up a character like Selwyn. In fact, I played him down."
