= Caddie (historical occupation) =

Urban occupation in 18th-century Scotland

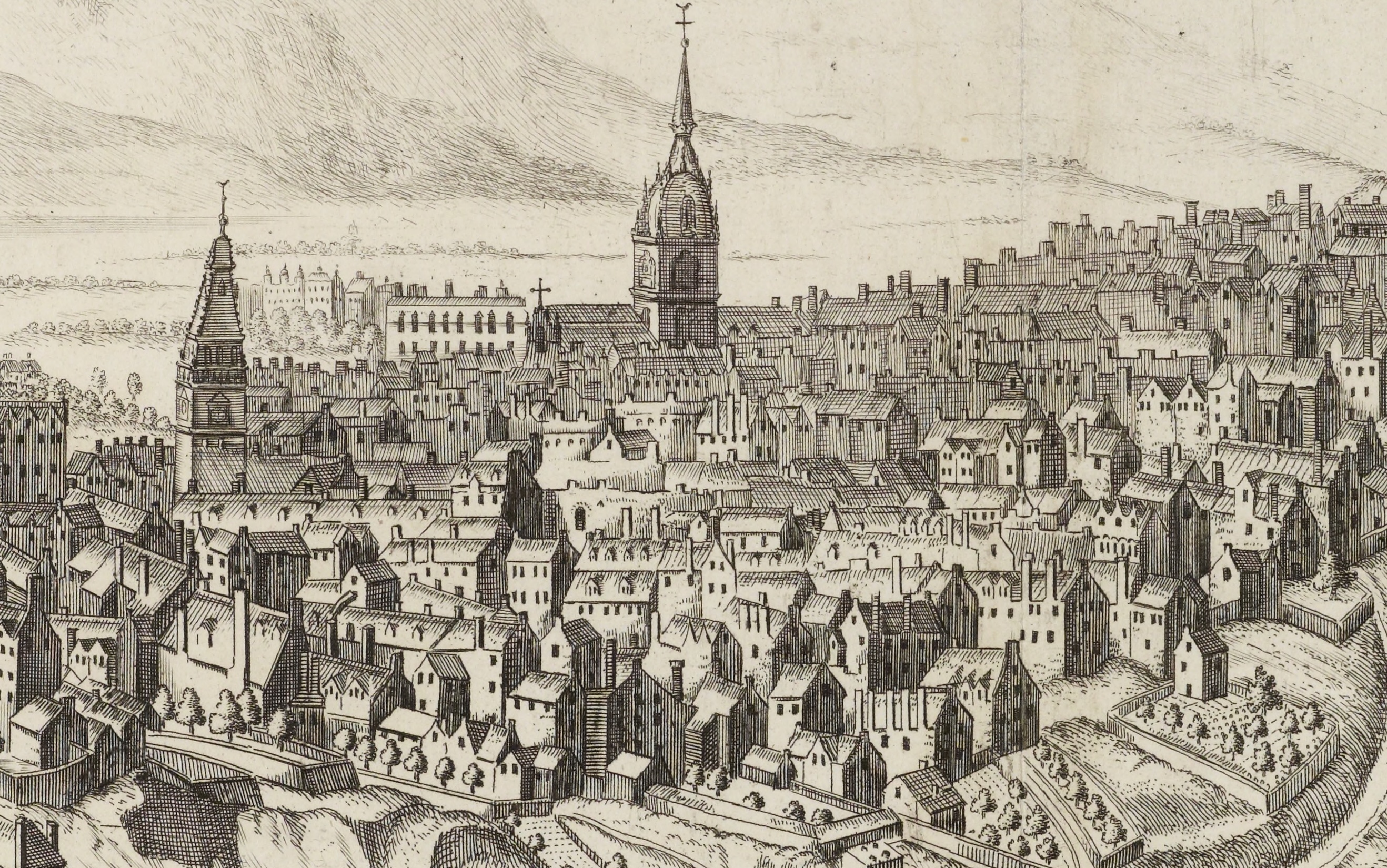
View of Edinburgh's Old Town from Slezer's Theatrum Scotiae

A caddie, also spelt "cadie", was an urban occupation in early 18th century Scotland ("in Edinburgh and other large towns") that consisted of running various errands. The term is a Scottish form of the French word cadet (student soldier).

== Origin ==
Writing in the middle of the 18th century, the first historian of Edinburgh, William Maitland, described "cadees" as "errand-men, news-cryers or pamphlet-sellers" existing before 1714. As of that date they became an organised society subject to regulation and supervision by the Town Council, which was responsible for upholding the monopoly of its members' activities within the city. Magistrates on the Council determined the number of members, each of whom was issued with an "apron of blue linnen" to be worn as a badge of identification "which none may lend, on pain of losing his privilege". On joining the Company each new member paid a deposit of 10 pounds Scots, as a surety for honesty and good behaviour, and the sum of 14 shillings and 6 pennies Scots into the "Company's Box". Members also had to pay a fixed amount of 6 pennies Scots after selling each new edition of newspapers and pamphlets. They were fined for transgressions of the company's rules, as well as incivilities such as drunkenness and gambling. Rule 3 laid down obligations for moral conduct to the effect that "Every one of the Company shall behave himself decently, and shall not use any unbecoming language to one another, much less to any other person, neither shall they curse or swear by faith, conscience, or the like, much less profane the Lord's name, or break the Sabbath-day; but shall go to church every Lord's Day, and therein behave themselves discreetly during Divine worship." Those who were illiterate were expected to attend school for one day each week to learn to read and write. Slovenly appearance, lodging disreputably and "fighting with any, beating his neighbour, or keeping a correspondence with thieves, pickpockets or debauched persons" were grounds for expulsion.

Caddies were employed on a first come, first served basis, Rule 5 stipulating that "When one is called to go an errand, or sell a paper, where two or more are present, he who cometh first to the person who called him, shall have the benefit of what is sold or had for going the errand, unless the person who called otherwise determine it."

Caddies were also entrusted with carrying out specific tasks by order of the Town Council, as in 1738 when they caught and killed every dog in town to prevent the spread of rabies.

== 18th century descriptions ==
Apart from the purposes identified by Maitland, caddies acted as town guides hired for their specialist knowledge of the city in an age before street plans and directories were available. Hugo Arnot wrote in 1799 that, "They are acquainted with the whole persons and places in Edinburgh; and the moment a stranger comes to town they get notice of it."

An English visitor, Edward Topham, writing in the mid-1770s, noted that,

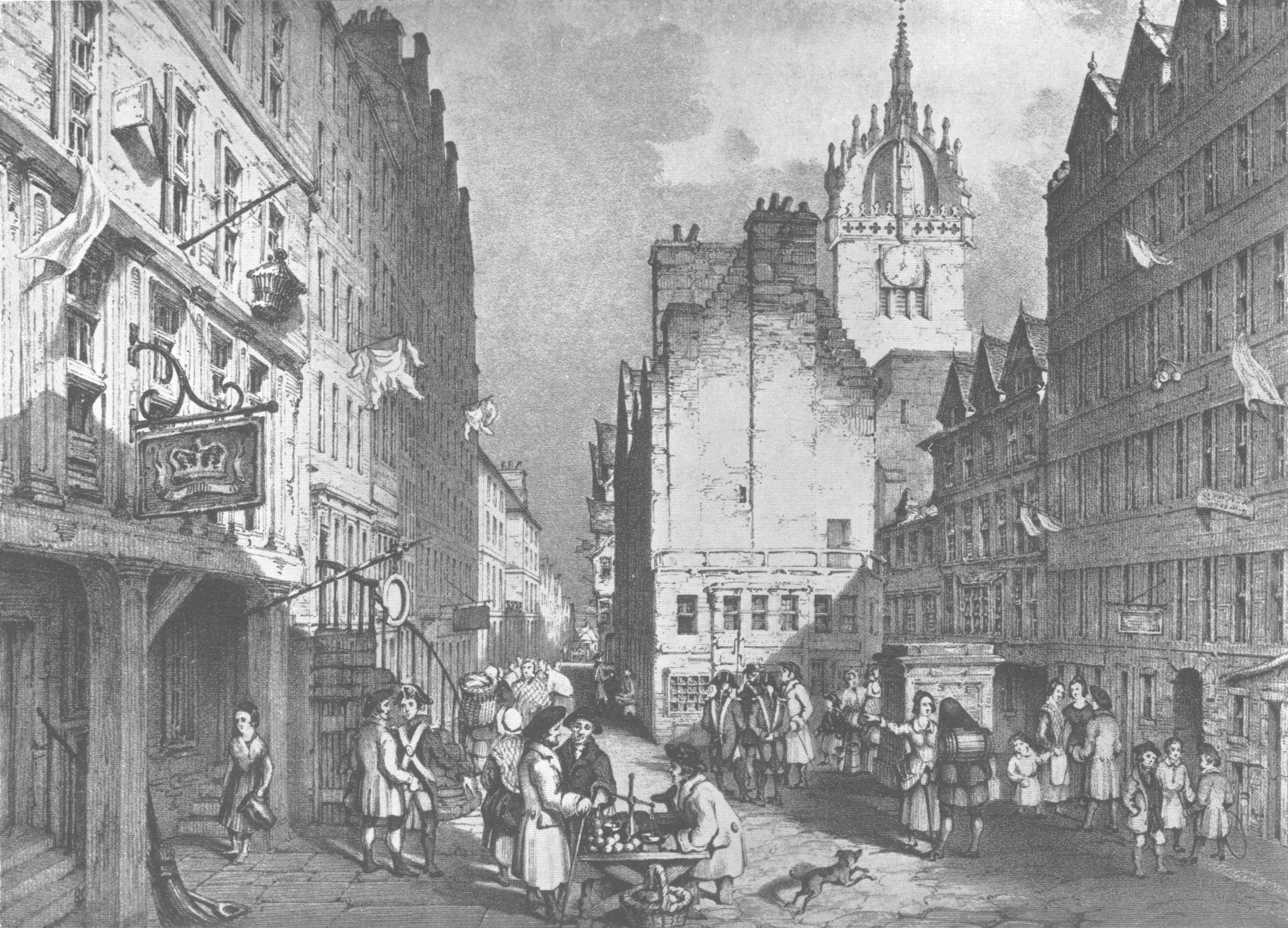
The High Street of Edinburgh in the 18th century. The figure seen talking to a member of the Town Guard below the barber-surgeon's pole and bleeding bowl, lower left, may be intended to depict a caddie imparting information. A water-caddie carrying a barrel on his back can be seen in front of the wellhead on the right of the picture. Click to view enlarged image.

"It is impossible at Edinburgh to be concealed or unknown, for though you enter into the City a mere traveller, and unacquainted, you cannot be there many hours before you are watched, and your name, and place of abode, found out by the Cadies. These are a Society of men who constantly attend the Cross in the High-Street, and whose office it is to do any thing that any body can want, and discharge any kind of business. On this account it is necessary for them to make themselves acquainted with the residence and negotiation of all the inhabitants; and they are of great utility, as without them it would be very difficult to find any body, on account of the great height of the houses, and the number of families in every building. This Society is under particular regulations, and it requires some interest to become a member of it. It is numerous, and contains persons for every use and employment, who faithfully execute all commands at a very reasonable price. Whether you are in need of a valet de place, a pimp, a thief-catcher, or a bully, your best resource is to the fraternity of Cadies. In short, they are the tutelary guardians of the City, and it is entirely owing to them, that there are fewer robberies, and less house-breaking in Edinburgh, than anywhere else".

"To tell you what these people do is impossible; for there is nothing almost which they do not do. ... A certain number of them stand all day long, and most of the night, at the top of the High-street, waiting for employment. Whoever has occasion for them, has only to pronounce the word "Cadie", and they fly from all parts to attend the summons. Whatever person you may want, they know immediately where he is to be found. Trust them with what sum of money you please, you are quite safe: they are obliged by the rules of their Order to make good every thing they lose. A gentleman once sent one of these Mercuries with a letter enclosing bills for some hundred pounds; the man lost it, and the Society (who are responsible for these losses) restored the sum to the proprietor".

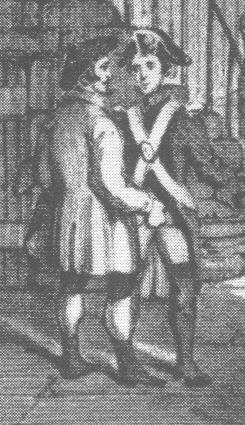
Detail from the above engraving

Topham also asserted that the Society of Cadies contributed to law enforcement by acting as the eyes and ears of the Town Guard.

"The moment a stranger comes into Edinburgh, they know it: how long he is to stay; whither he is going; where he comes from, and what he is. In regard to the Police, this may be a convenience, otherwise it would be a great nuisance. (...) These are the people who are the great means of preserving the public peace, and of preventing all those crimes which are generally perpetrated under a Police which is ill-observed. It is the certainty of punishment which prevents guilt: for when a man is sure of being discovered, he dreads the commission of the smallest offences. ... Nothing can reflect more honour on this City, than the safety in which every man finds himself and his property".

For visitors to the city without their own manservants caddies could be hired to guide them safely by torchlight through the warren of closes in the Old Town at night. Captain Edmund Burt, an English soldier visiting Edinburgh in the 1750s, relates how he was assisted to his lodgings at ten o'clock at night, just as the beat of the city drum signalled the time for residents to empty their chamber-pots from their windows with the cry of "Gardyloo!" (said to derive from the French gardez [vous de] l'eau!).

"Being in my retreat to pass through a long narrow wynde or alley, to go to my new lodgings, a guide was assigned to me, who went before me to prevent my disgrace, crying out all the way, with a loud voice, "Hud your haunds". The throwing up of a sash, or otherwise opening a window, made me tremble, while behind and before me, at some little distance, fell the terrible shower."

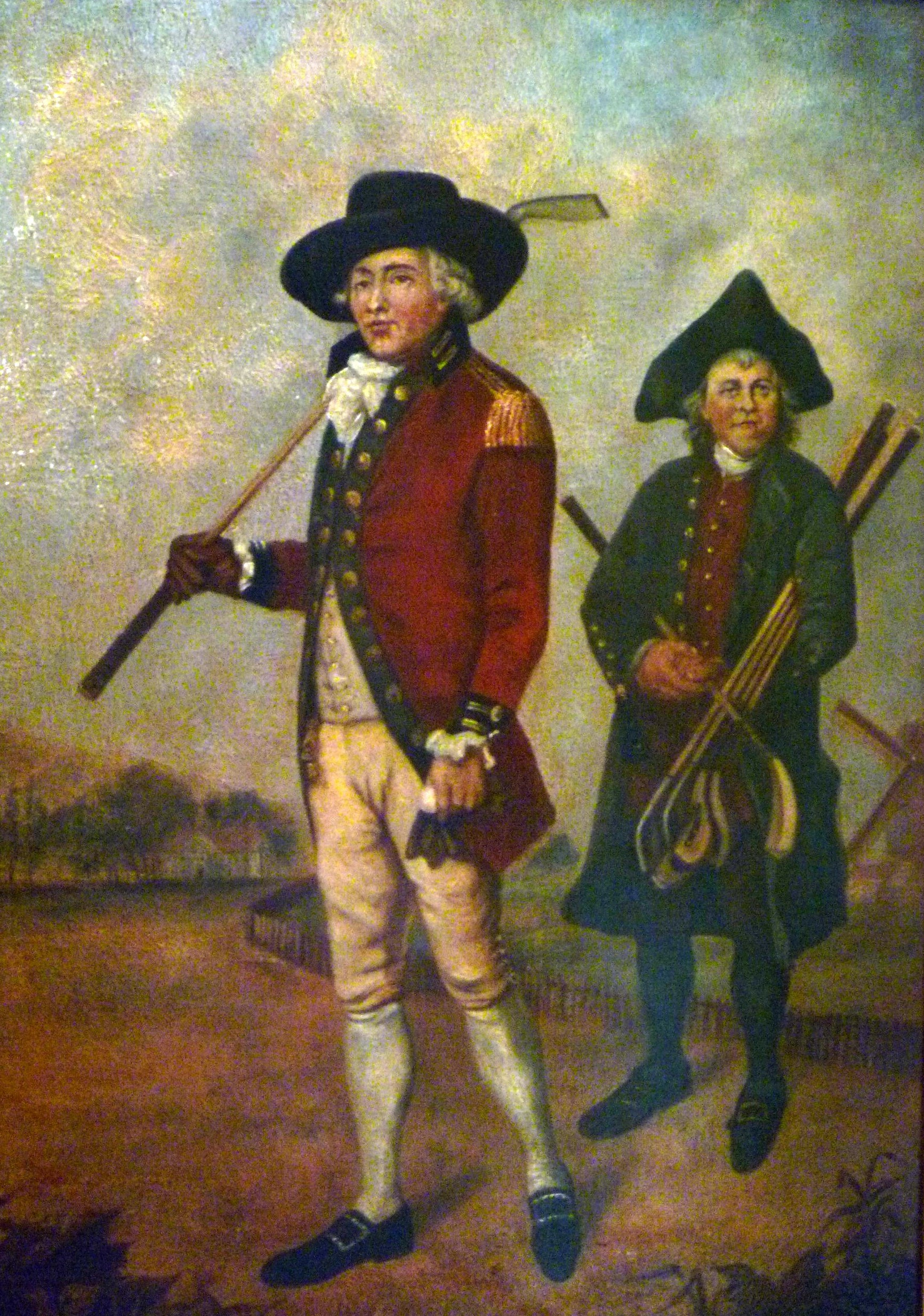
A golf caddie, 1790, by Lemuel Francis Abbott

When Robert Chambers described caddies in 1824, he used the past tense, implying that the occupation no longer existed. He called them "street messengers" and characterised them as "a ragged, half-blackguard-looking set", but "allowed to be amazingly acute and intelligent, and also faithful to any duty entrusted to them. A stranger coming to reside temporarily in Edinburgh got a caddy attached to his service to conduct him from one part of the town to another, to run errands for him; in short, to be wholly at his bidding."

The term "water-caddie" was used for a hired water-carrier, as recorded by Henry Cockburn in his personal memoir of life in Edinburgh written between 1821 and 1830. Cockburn describes the almost overnight disappearance of this particular occupation as occurring around 1820 as a result of water being newly piped to houses instead of being drawn from communal street-wells.

== The golfing term ==
The term "caddie" has been used to refer to a golfer's assistant since around 1850.
