= Ralph Basset (died 1282) =

13th-century English politician

Ralph Basset (fl. 1263–1265) was an English baronial leader.

Basset was lord of Sapcote, Leicestershire. By the Provisions of Oxford he was appointed constable of Northampton, and he was one of the sureties ex parte baronum for the observance of the Mise of Amiens (December 1263). He was again entrusted by the barons with Northampton, and was appointed, after Lewes, custos pacis (keeper of the peace) for Leicestershire in June 1264. As 'Radulfus Basset de Sapercote' he was summoned to Simon de Montfort's parliament on 24 December 1264 and fought at Evesham in 1265 in the ranks of the barons.
