= Ralph Basset, 2nd Baron Basset of Drayton =

English nobleman

Arms of Ralph, 2nd Baron Basset of Drayton: Paly of six, or and gules, a canton ermine.

Ralph Basset, 2nd Baron Basset of Drayton (died 25 February 1343) was a 13th-14th century English nobleman who fought in both the Anglo-French War and in the First War of Scottish Independence.

== Background ==
Basset was the son of Ralph Basset and Hawise. Ralph succeeded his father on his death on 31 December 1299, and was knighted on 22 May 1306.

== Military career ==
Distinguishing himself in France, Ralph was appointed to the office of Seneschal of Gascony on 11 June 1323, also serving as the Steward of the Duchy of Aquitaine.

Within the first four months of holding office in Gascony, the Gascon nobleman Raymond-Bernard de Montpezat raided Saint-Sardos and hanged a royal sergeant of King Charles IV of France. Basset was within the village's vicinity when de Montpezat raided Saint-Sardos and the two had met only two days earlier. The French assumed Basset was complicit in the raid. King Edward II of England sent forth an apology to the French king, declaring his innocence. Basset was summoned to Bergerac, but he declined to appear and replied with unconvincing excuses. While Charles IV was inclined to accept Edward II's excuses, he was determined to try Basset and de Montpezat, though neither appeared in court and they were outlawed and their property forfeited to the French crown. By 15 March 1324, Basset was recalled to England and removed from his office, though he was briefly reappointed from 21 July to 18 November 1324.

Basset held the office of Constable of Dover Castle between March and September 1326 as well as the office of Warden of the Cinque Ports during the same time. Ralph was created a Knight Banneret in 1341 and died in 1343.

== Marriage and issue ==
Ralph married Joan, the daughter of John de Grey of Wilton and Matilda de Verdun. They obtained a marriage license on 27 March 1304 to wed. They are known to have had the following issue:

- Margaret Basset, married John de Bohun, 5th Earl of Hereford without issue.
- Ralph Basset (died 1335), married Alice Audley, had issue.

He was succeeded in the barony by his grandson, Ralph, the son of Ralph (died 1335) who predeceased him.

== Citations ==
Peerage of England
Preceded by Ralph Basset	Baron Basset of Drayton; 1299–1343	Succeeded by Ralph Basset
