= Ralph Basset, 3rd Baron Basset of Drayton =

English soldier knight (1335–1390)

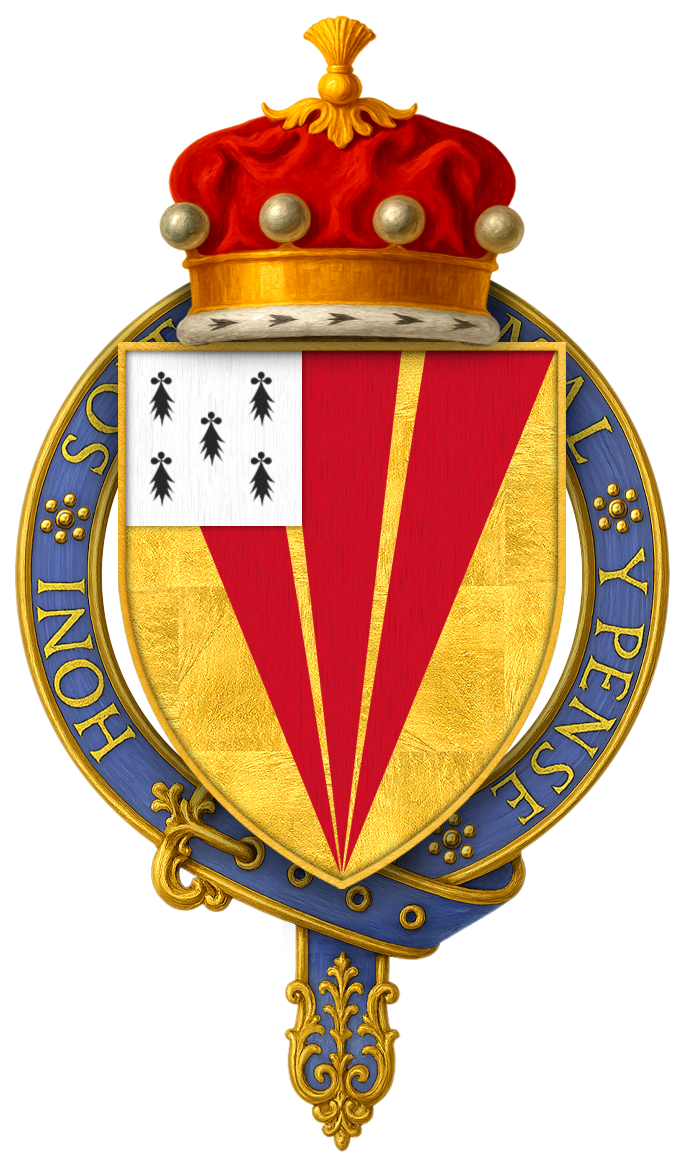
Arms of Sir Ralph Bassett. Or, three piles, the points meeting in base, Gules, a quarter Ermine

Ralph Basset, 3rd Baron Basset of Drayton (or alternatively 4th Baron Basset) KG (1335 – 10 May 1390) was a medieval English soldier knight, one of the earliest-appointed Knights of the Garter.

He was the son of Ralph Basset and his wife Alice, the daughter of Nicholas, Baron Audley. His father predeceased his own father Ralph Basset, 2nd Baron Basset of Drayton in 1335 so Ralph junior thus succeeded his grandfather in 1343 to the title and estates at the age of eight.

In 1355 he was summoned to join the army of the Black Prince in the French campaign and in 1356 was present in the English victory at Poitiers. On his return he was called to the House of Lords. In 1359 he was with Edward III in France on his campaign to claim the French throne which ended with Peace of Brétigny the following year. He was present at other French campaigns in 1365 and 1368, and in the latter year was admitted to the Order of the Garter to fill the empty place caused by the death of Lionel of Antwerp, 1st Duke of Clarence. He also owned Walsall Castle and he helped to rebuild it between 1385 and 1386.

In 1369 he was back in France fighting in a diversionary campaign under the Duke of Lancaster. On the accession of King Richard II in 1377 he was yet again ordered to France, serving firstly in an abortive campaign under Sir John Arundel and secondly under Thomas of Woodstock, 1st Duke of Gloucester. In 1385 he was in a disastrous campaign in Spain with John of Gaunt.

He died without issue in 1390, leaving a widow Joan, and was interred in Lichfield cathedral. His heirs were Thomas Stafford, 3rd Earl of Stafford and Alice, wife of Sir William Chaworth.

Peerage of England
Preceded by Ralph Basset	Baron Basset of Drayton; 1343–1390	Extinct
