= Ralph Basset, 1st Lord Basset of Drayton =

English nobleman

Governor of Edinburgh Castle
- In office 1291–1296

1st Baron Basset
- In office 1295–1299

Personal details
- Born: before 1265
- Died: 31 December 1299

Ralph Basset, 1st Baron Basset (before 1265 – 31 December 1299) of Drayton Bassett in Staffordshire, was an English nobleman who fought in both the Anglo-French War and in the First War of Scottish Independence. He was the son of one of Simon de Montfort's barons, Ralph Basset (d.1265), and Margaret de Somery. In 1291, he was made Governor of Edinburgh Castle. He was created 1st Baron Basset of Drayton in 1295.

== Family and title ==
Ralph Basset was the son of one of Simon de Montfort's baronial lords, also called Ralph Basset, and Margaret de Somery. Ralph senior was killed in the Battle of Evesham with de Montfort's forces in 1265 with his lands and titles being forfeited due to his rebellion.

In some records Ralph Basset is listed as the 2nd Baron Basset of Drayton, his father being the first. The Barony of Drayton was created during Simon de Montfort's Parliament in 1264 but the validity of the summons and appointments have been debated over the subsequent centuries. Depending on the view taken, in 1295, Ralph Basset was either created as the 1st Baron Basset of Drayton or he regained his father's title as the 2nd baron.

Ralph Basset married Hawise de Grey and on his death at the close of 1299 was succeeded by his son, another Ralph Basset.

== Governor of Edinburgh Castle ==
In the political tumult brought about by the various competitors for the Crown of Scotland, Edward I of England was able to gain an advantage. On 11 June 1291 the town and castle of Edinburgh were placed into his hands and he subsequently granted the governorship of Edinburgh Castle to Drayton and the Castle was garrisoned with English soldiers.

== Notes ==
Military offices
Preceded by William de Kinghorn; Scottish governor	Governor of Edinburgh Castle; 1291–1296	Succeeded by Walter de Huntercombe, 1st Baron Huntercombe
Peerage of England
New creation	Baron Basset of Drayton; 1295–1299	Succeeded by Ralph Basset
