= Ralph Basset (died 1265) =

English baronial leader

Ralph Basset (died 1265), was an English baronial leader.

Basset was lord of Drayton in Staffordshire, and, joining the baronial party against Henry III, was appointed by them custos pacis (keeper of the peace) for Shropshire and Staffordshire on 7 June 1264, and was summoned to Simon de Montfort's parliament on 4 December 1264 as Ralph Basset "de Drayton". He fell at the battle of Evesham by De Montfort's side on 4 August 1265, having refused, when urged by him, to seek safety in flight.

His lands were forfeited for rebellion, but restored to his widow Margaret, as the daughter of a royalist, Roger de Someri.

He was the father of Ralph Basset, 1st Lord Basset of Drayton and Maud, who married John Grey, 2nd Baron Grey de Wilton.
