= Civilization =

Stratified complex society

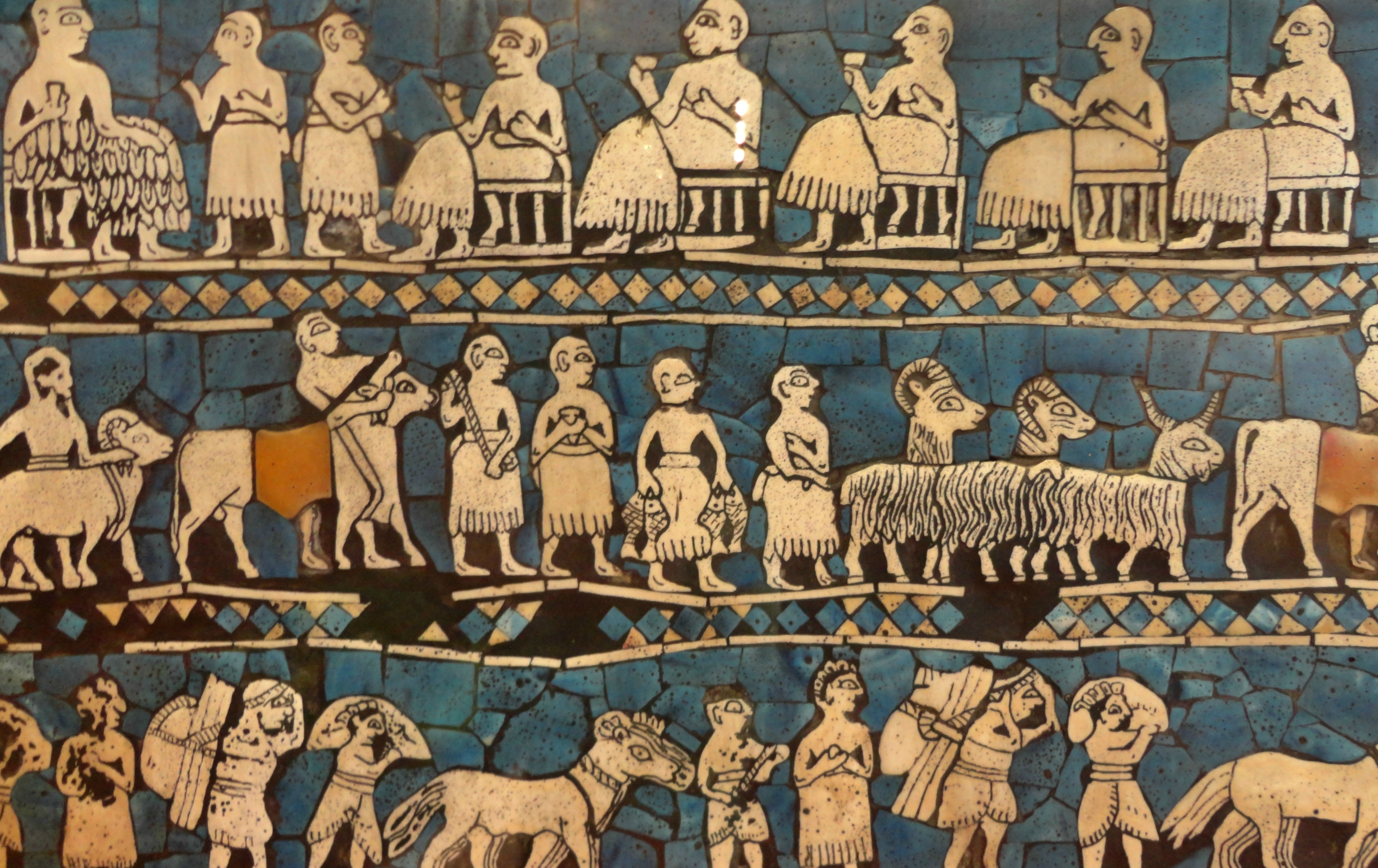
The ancient Sumerians of Mesopotamia were the oldest civilization in the world, beginning about 4000 BCE, here depicted around 2500 BCE, showing the different social roles in the Sumerian society of Ur.

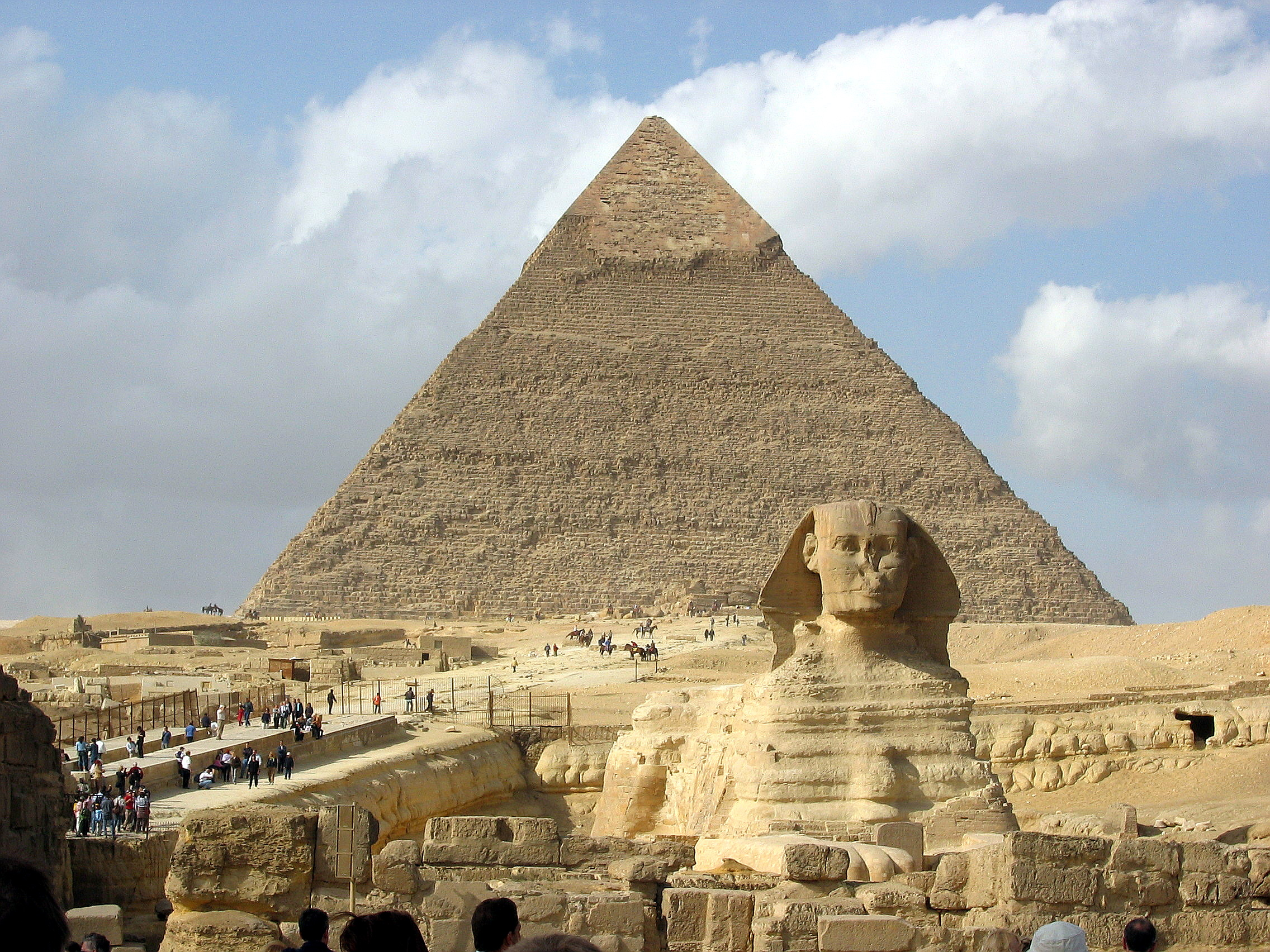
Ancient Egypt is an example of one of the first civilizations, building pyramids starting in the 3rd millennium BCE.

A civilization (American English and Oxford spelling) or civilisation (common British English) is any complex society characterized by the development of the state, urbanization, and standardized symbolic systems of communication, namely writing systems..

Civilizations are organized around densely populated settlements, divided into more or less rigid hierarchical social classes of division of labour, often with a ruling elite and subordinate urban and rural populations, which engage in intensive agriculture, mining, small-scale manufacture and trade. Civilization concentrates power, extending human control over the rest of nature, including over other human beings. Civilizations are characterized by elaborate agriculture, architecture, infrastructure, technological advancement, currency, taxation, regulation, and specialization of labour.

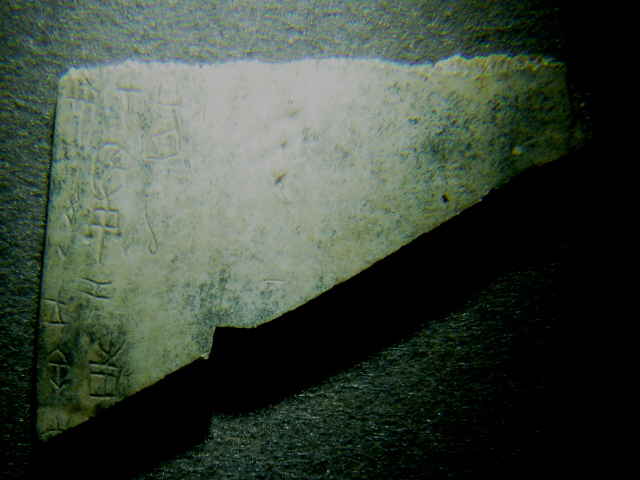
Shang dynasty (16th (?) - 11th c. BCE) oracle bone writing. China is one of the oldest civilizations in the world, possibly originating in the 21st century BCE.

A civilization is often understood as a larger and historically as a "more advanced" culture, in implied contrast to smaller or supposedly less advanced cultures, even societies within civilizations themselves and within their histories. Generally civilization contrasts with non-centralized tribal societies, including the cultures of nomadic pastoralists, Neolithic societies, or hunter-gatherers.

The word civilization relates to the Latin civitas or 'city'. As the National Geographic Society has explained it: "This is why the most basic definition of the word civilization is 'a society made up of cities.'" The earliest emergence of civilizations is generally connected with the final stages of the Neolithic Revolution in West Asia, culminating in the relatively rapid process of urban revolution and state formation, a political development associated with the appearance of a governing elite.

== History of the concept ==
The English word civilization comes from the French civilisé ('civilized'), from Latin: civilis ('civil'), related to civis ('citizen') and civitas ('city'). The fundamental treatise is Norbert Elias's The Civilizing Process (1939), which traces social mores from medieval courtly society to the early modern period. (Note: It remains the most influential sociological study of the topic, spawning its own body of secondary literature. Notably, Hans Peter Duerr attacked it in a major work (3,500 pages in five volumes, published 1988–2002). Elias, at the time a nonagenarian, was still able to respond to the criticism the year before his death. In 2002, Duerr was himself criticized by Michael Hinz's Der Zivilisationsprozeß: Mythos oder Realität (2002), saying that his criticism amounted to hateful defamation of Elias, through excessive standards of political correctness.) In The Philosophy of Civilization (1923), Albert Schweitzer outlines two opinions: one purely material and the other material and ethical. He said that the world crisis was from humanity losing the ethical idea of civilization, "the sum total of all progress made by man in every sphere of action and from every point of view in so far as the progress helps towards the spiritual perfecting of individuals as the progress of all progress".

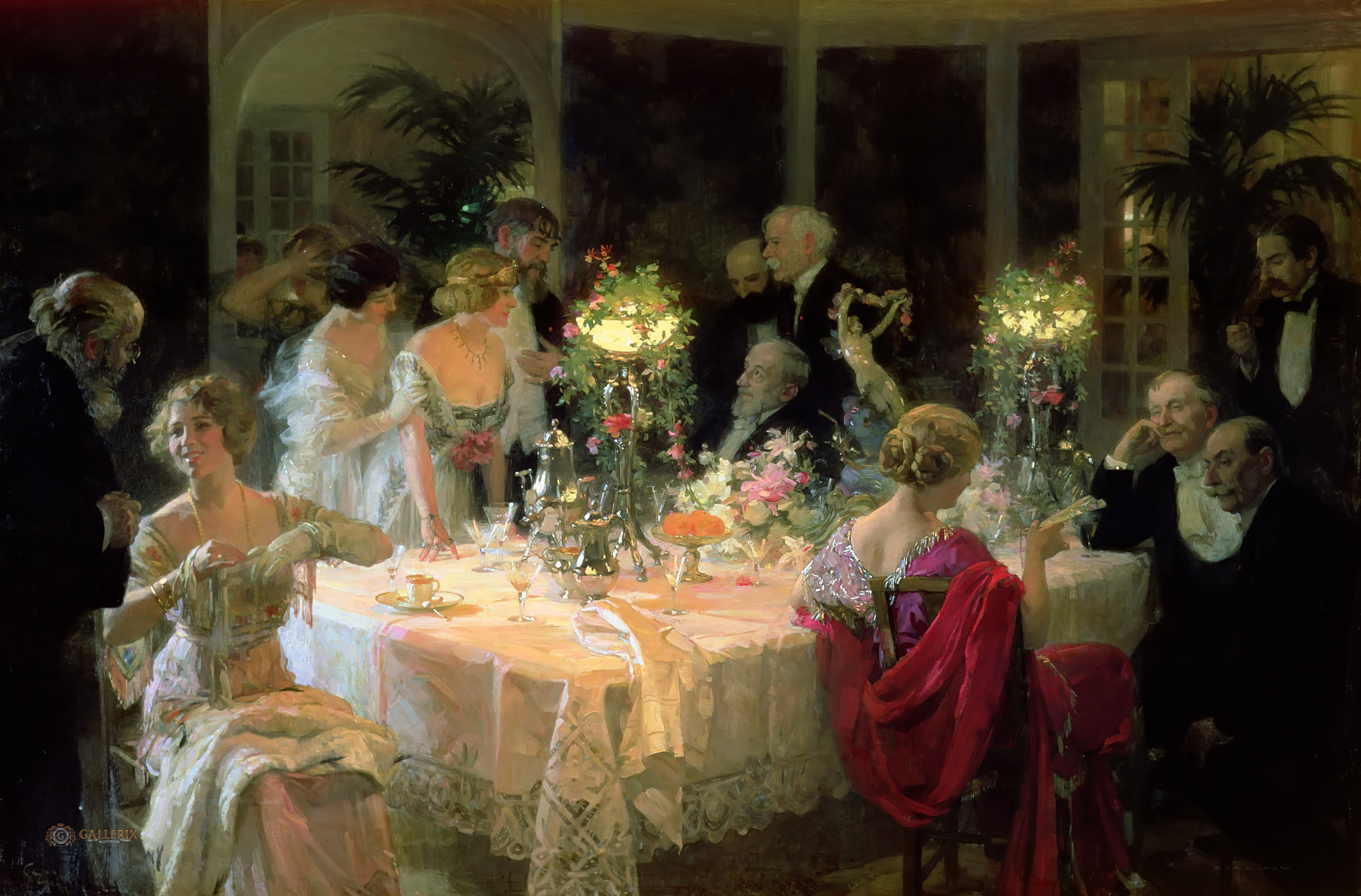
The End of Dinner by Jules-Alexandre Grün (1913). The emergence of table manners and other forms of etiquette and self-restraint are presented as a characteristic of civilized society by Norbert Elias in his book The Civilizing Process (1939).

Related words like "civility" developed in the mid-16th century. The abstract noun "civilization", meaning "civilized condition", came in the 1760s, again from French. The first known use in French is in 1757, by Victor de Riqueti, marquis de Mirabeau, and the first use in English is attributed to Adam Ferguson, who in his 1767 Essay on the History of Civil Society wrote, "Not only the individual advances from infancy to manhood but the species itself from rudeness to civilisation". The word was therefore opposed to barbarism or rudeness, in the active pursuit of progress characteristic of the Age of Enlightenment.

In the late 1700s and early 1800s, during the French Revolution, "civilization" was used in the singular, never in the plural, and meant the progress of humanity as a whole. This is still the case in French. The use of "civilizations" as a countable noun was in occasional use in the 19th century, (Note: For example, in the title A narrative of the loss of the Winterton East Indiaman wrecked on the coast of Madagascar in 1792; and of the sufferings connected with that event. To which is subjoined a short account of the natives of Madagascar, with suggestions as to their civilizations by J. Hatchard, L.B. Seeley and T. Hamilton, London, 1820.) but has become much more common in the later 20th century, sometimes just meaning culture (itself in origin an uncountable noun, made countable in the context of ethnography). Using the terms "civilization" and "culture" as equivalents was uncommon before then, so that, for example, some types of culture were not normally described as civilizations. Samuel P. Huntington, writing in 1996, defined a civilization as simply a “culture writ large”.

Already in the 18th century, civilization was not always seen as an improvement. One historically important distinction between culture and civilization is from the writings of Rousseau, particularly his work about education, Emile. Here, civilization, being more rational and socially driven, is not fully in accord with human nature, and "human wholeness is achievable only through the recovery of or approximation to an original discursive or pre-rational natural unity" (see noble savage). From this, a new approach was developed, especially in Germany, first by Johann Gottfried Herder and later by philosophers such as Kierkegaard and Nietzsche. This sees cultures as natural organisms, not defined by "conscious, rational, deliberative acts", but a kind of pre-rational "folk spirit". Civilization, in contrast, though more rational and more successful in material progress, is unnatural and leads to "vices of social life" such as guile, hypocrisy, envy and avarice. In World War II, Leo Strauss, having fled Germany, argued in New York that this opinion of civilization was behind Nazism and German militarism and nihilism.

== Characteristics ==
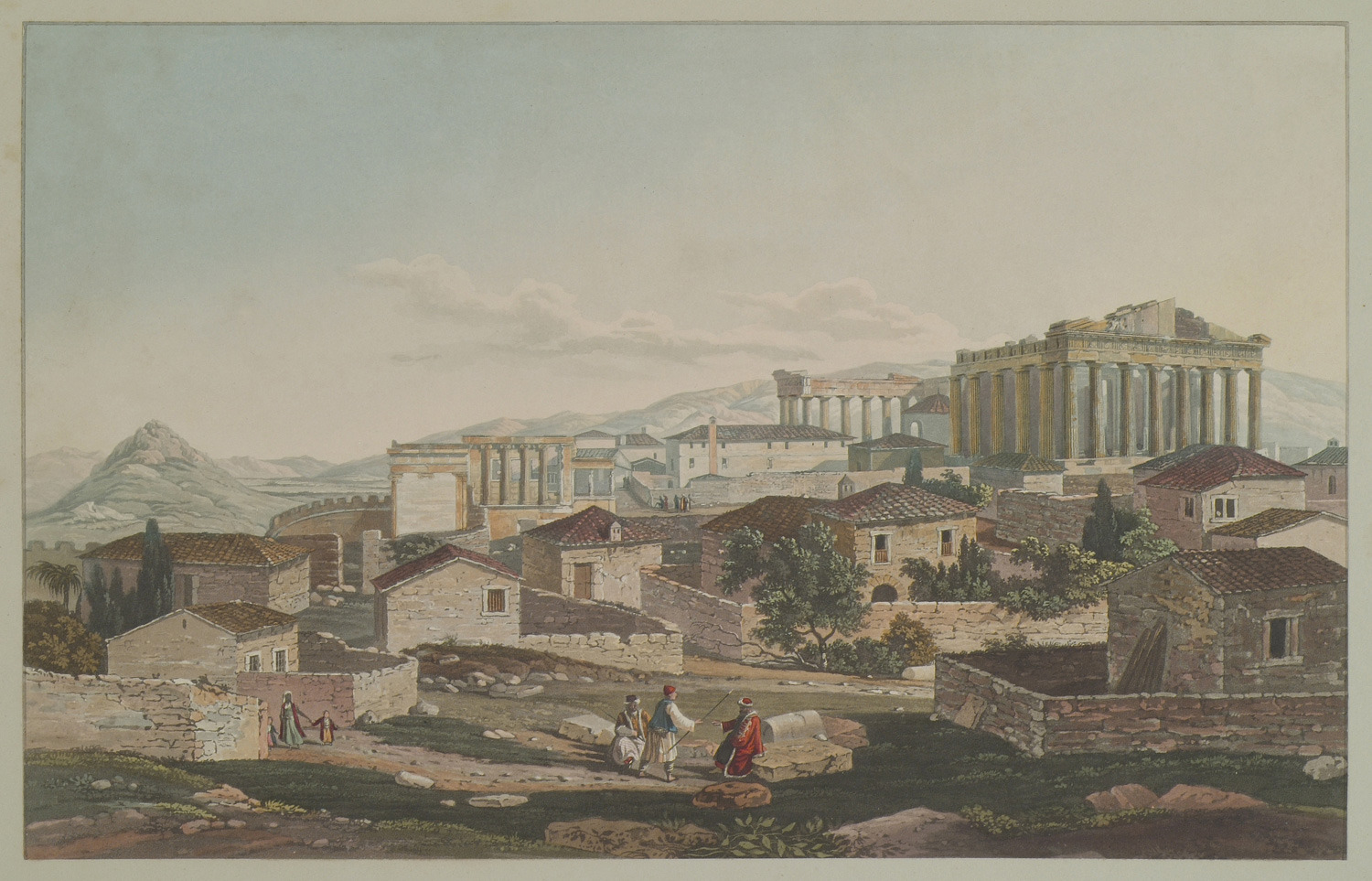
The Acropolis of Athens: Greece has traditionally been seen as the cradle of a distinct European or "Western" civilization.

Social scientists such as V. Gordon Childe have named a number of traits that distinguish a civilization from other kinds of society. Civilizations have been distinguished by their means of subsistence, types of livelihood, settlement patterns, forms of government, social stratification, economic systems, literacy and other cultural traits. Andrew Nikiforuk argues that "civilizations relied on shackled human muscle. It took the energy of slaves to plant crops, clothe emperors, and build cities" and considers slavery to be a common feature of pre-modern civilizations.

All civilizations have depended on agriculture for subsistence, with the possible exception of some early civilizations in Peru which may have depended upon maritime resources. Most developed and permanent civilizations depended on cereal agriculture. The traditional "surplus model" postulates that cereal farming results in accumulated storage and a surplus of food, particularly when people use intensive agricultural techniques such as artificial fertilization, irrigation and crop rotation. It is possible but more difficult to accumulate horticultural production, and so civilizations based on horticultural gardening have been very rare. Grain surpluses have been especially important because grain can be stored for a long time.

Research from the Journal of Political Economy contradicts the surplus model. It postulates that horticultural gardening was more productive than cereal farming. However, only cereal farming produced civilization because of the appropriability of the yearly harvest. Rural populations that could only grow cereals could be taxed allowing for a taxing elite and urban development. This also had a negative effect on the rural population, increasing relative agricultural output per farmer. Farming efficiency created food surplus and sustained the food surplus through decreasing rural population growth in favour of urban growth. Suitability of highly productive roots and tubers was in fact a curse of plenty, which prevented the emergence of states and impeded economic development.

A surplus of food permits some people to do things besides producing food for a living: early civilizations included soldiers, artisans, priests and priestesses, and other people with specialized careers. A surplus of food results in a division of labour and a more diverse range of human activity, a defining trait of civilizations. However, in some places hunter-gatherers have had access to food surpluses, such as among some of the indigenous peoples of the Pacific Northwest and perhaps during the Mesolithic Natufian culture. It is possible that food surpluses and relatively large scale social organization and division of labour predates plant and animal domestication.

Civilizations have distinctly different settlement patterns from other societies. The word civilization is sometimes defined as "living in cities". Non-farmers tend to gather in cities to work and to trade.

Compared with other societies, civilizations have a more complex political structure, namely the state. State societies are more stratified than other societies; there is a greater difference among the social classes. The ruling class, normally concentrated in the cities, has control over much of the surplus and exercises its will through the actions of a government or bureaucracy. Morton Fried, a conflict theorist and Elman Service, an integration theorist, have classified human cultures based on political systems and social inequality. This system of classification contains four categories.

- Hunter-gatherer bands, which are generally egalitarian.
- Horticultural–pastoralist societies in which there are generally two inherited social classes: chief and commoner.
- Highly stratified structures, or chiefdoms, with several inherited social classes: king, noble, freemen, serf and slave.
- Civilizations, with complex social hierarchies and organized, institutional forms of government.

Civilizations can show varying degrees of social mobility and social stratification. Economically, civilizations display more complex patterns of ownership and exchange than less organized societies. Living in one place allows people to accumulate more personal possessions than nomadic people. Some people also acquire landed property, or private ownership of the land. Because a percentage of people in civilizations do not grow their own food, they must trade their goods and services for food in a market system, or receive food through the levy of tribute, redistributive taxation, tariffs or tithes from the food producing segment of the population. Early human cultures functioned through a gift economy supplemented by limited barter systems. By the early Iron Age, contemporary civilizations developed money as a medium of exchange for increasingly complex transactions. In a village, the potter makes a pot for the brewer and the brewer compensates the potter by giving him a certain amount of beer. In a city, the potter may need a new roof, the roofer may need new shoes, the cobbler may need new horseshoes, the blacksmith may need a new coat and the tanner may need a new pot. These people may not be personally acquainted with one another and their needs may not occur all at the same time. A monetary system is a way of organizing these obligations to ensure that they are fulfilled. From the days of the earliest monetarized civilizations, monopolistic controls of monetary systems have benefited the social and political elites.

The transition from simpler to more complex economies does not necessarily mean an improvement in the living standards of the populace. For example, although the Middle Ages is often portrayed as an era of decline from the Roman Empire, studies have shown that the average stature of males in the Middle Ages (c. 500 to 1500 CE) was greater than it was for males during the preceding Roman Empire and the succeeding Early Modern Period (c. 1500 to 1800 CE). Also, the Plains Indians of North America in the 19th century were taller than their "civilized" American and European counterparts. The average stature of a population is a good measurement of the adequacy of its access to necessities, especially food, and its freedom from disease.

Writing, developed first by people in Sumer, is considered a hallmark of civilization and "appears to accompany the rise of complex administrative bureaucracies or the conquest state". Traders and bureaucrats relied on writing to keep accurate records. Like money, the writing was necessitated by the size of the population of a city and the complexity of its commerce among people who are not all personally acquainted with each other. However, writing is not always necessary for civilization, as shown by the Inca civilization of the Andes, which did not use writing at all but except for a complex recording system consisting of knotted strings of different lengths and colours: the quipus, and still functioned as a civilized society.

Aided by their division of labour and central government planning, civilizations have developed many other diverse cultural traits. These include organized religion, development in the arts, and countless new advances in science and technology.

Assessments of what level of civilization a polity has reached are based on comparisons of the relative importance of agricultural as opposed to trading or manufacturing capacities, the territorial extensions of its power, the complexity of its division of labour, and the carrying capacity of its urban centres. Secondary elements include a developed transportation system, writing, standardized measurement, currency, contractual and tort-based legal systems, art, architecture, mathematics, scientific understanding, metallurgy, political structures, and organized religion.

=== As a contrast with other societies ===
The idea of civilization implies a progression or development from a previous "uncivilized" state. Traditionally, cultures that defined themselves as "civilized" often did so in contrast to other societies or human groupings viewed as less civilized, calling the latter barbarians, savages, and primitives. Indeed, the modern Western idea of civilization developed as a contrast to the indigenous cultures European settlers encountered during the European colonization of the Americas and Australia. The term "primitive," though once used in anthropology, has now been largely condemned by anthropologists because of its derogatory connotations and because it implies that the cultures it refers to are relics of a past time that do not change or progress.

Because of this, societies regarding themselves as "civilized" have sometimes sought to dominate and assimilate "uncivilized" cultures into a "civilized" way of living. In the 19th century, the idea of European culture as "civilized" and superior to "uncivilized" non-European cultures was fully developed, and civilization became a core part of European identity. The idea of civilization can also be used as a justification for dominating another culture and dispossessing a people of their land. For example, in Australia, British settlers justified the displacement of Indigenous Australians by observing that the land appeared uncultivated and wild, which to them reflected that the inhabitants were not civilized enough to "improve" it. The behaviours and modes of subsistence that characterize civilization have been spread by colonization, invasion, religious conversion, the extension of bureaucratic control and trade, and by the introduction of new technologies to cultures that did not previously have them. Though aspects of culture associated with civilization can be freely adopted through contact between cultures, since early modern times Eurocentric ideals of "civilization" have been widely imposed upon cultures through coercion and dominance. These ideals complemented a philosophy that assumed there were innate differences between "civilized" and "uncivilized" peoples.

== Cultural identity ==
"Civilization" can also refer to the culture of a complex society, not just the society itself. Every society, civilization or not, has a specific set of ideas and customs, and a certain set of manufactures and arts that make it unique. Civilizations tend to develop intricate cultures, including a state-based decision-making apparatus, a literature, professional art, architecture, organized religion and complex customs of education, coercion and control associated with maintaining the elite.

The intricate culture associated with civilization has a tendency to spread to and influence other cultures, sometimes assimilating them into the civilization, a classic example being Chinese civilization and its influence on nearby civilizations such as Korea, Japan and Vietnam Many civilizations are actually large cultural spheres containing many nations and regions. The civilization in which someone lives is that person's broadest cultural identity.

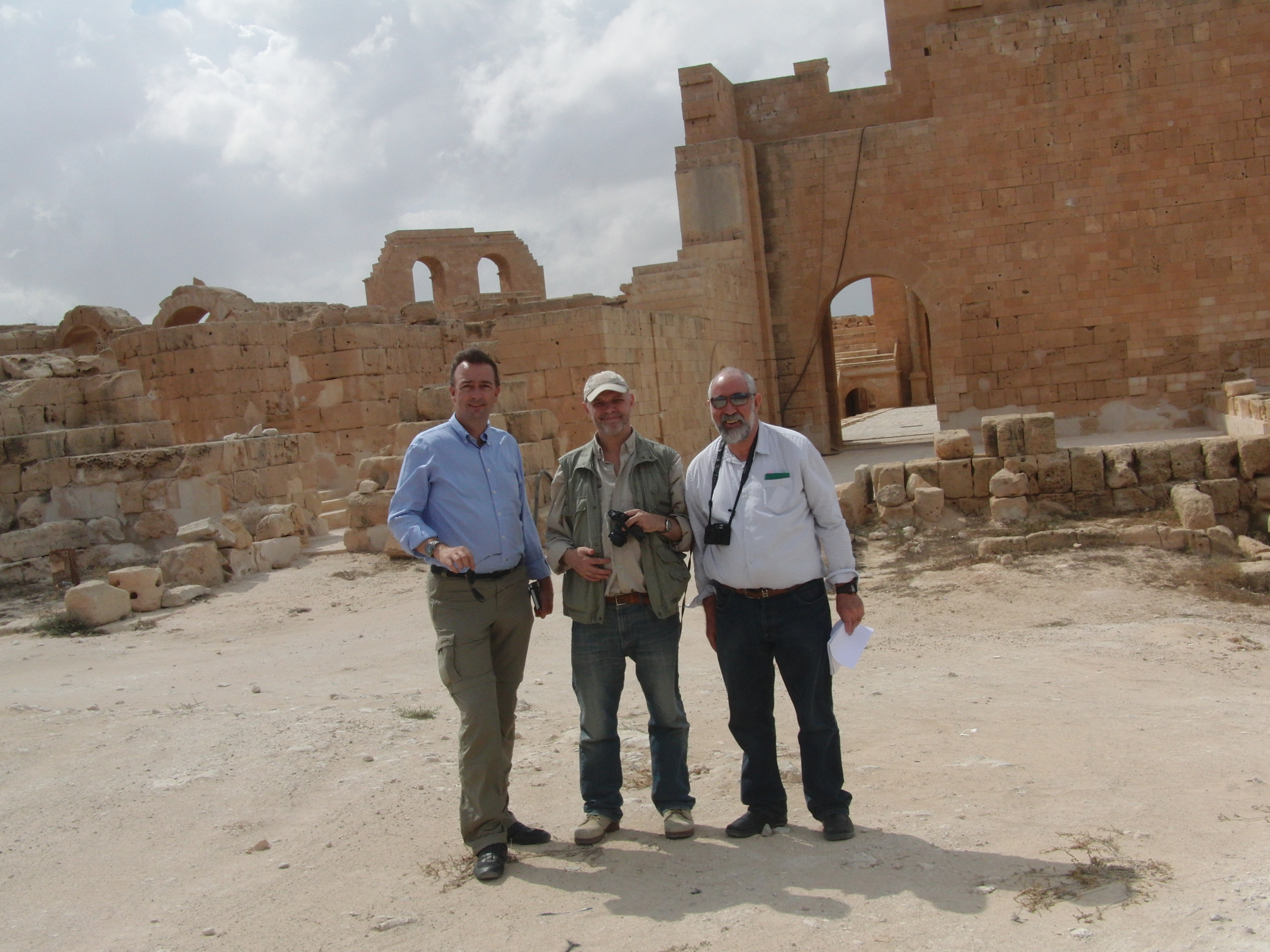
A Blue Shield International mission in Libya during the war in 2011 to protect the cultural assets there.

It is precisely the protection of this cultural identity that is becoming increasingly important nationally and internationally. According to international law, the United Nations and UNESCO try to set up and enforce relevant rules. The aim is to preserve the cultural heritage of humanity and also the cultural identity, especially in the case of war and armed conflict. According to Karl von Habsburg, President of Blue Shield International, the destruction of cultural assets is also part of psychological warfare. The target of the attack is often the opponent's cultural identity, which is why symbolic cultural assets become a main target. It is also intended to destroy the particularly sensitive cultural memory (museums, archives, monuments, etc.), the grown cultural diversity, and the economic basis (such as tourism) of a state, region or community.

Many historians have focused on these broad cultural spheres and have treated civilizations as discrete units. Early twentieth-century philosopher Oswald Spengler, uses the German word Kultur, "culture", for what many call a "civilization". Spengler believed a civilization's coherence is based on a single primary cultural symbol. Cultures experience cycles of birth, life, decline, and death, often supplanted by a potent new culture, formed around a compelling new cultural symbol. Spengler states civilization is the beginning of the decline of a culture as "the most external and artificial states of which a species of developed humanity is capable".

This "unified culture" concept of civilization also influenced the theories of historian Arnold J. Toynbee in the mid-twentieth century. Toynbee explored civilization processes in his multi-volume A Study of History, which traced the rise and, in most cases, the decline of 21 civilizations and five "arrested civilizations". Civilizations generally declined and fell, according to Toynbee, because of the failure of a "creative minority", through moral or religious decline, to meet some important challenge, rather than mere economic or environmental causes.

Samuel P. Huntington defines civilization as "the highest cultural grouping of people and the broadest level of cultural identity people have short of that which distinguishes humans from other species".

== Complex systems ==
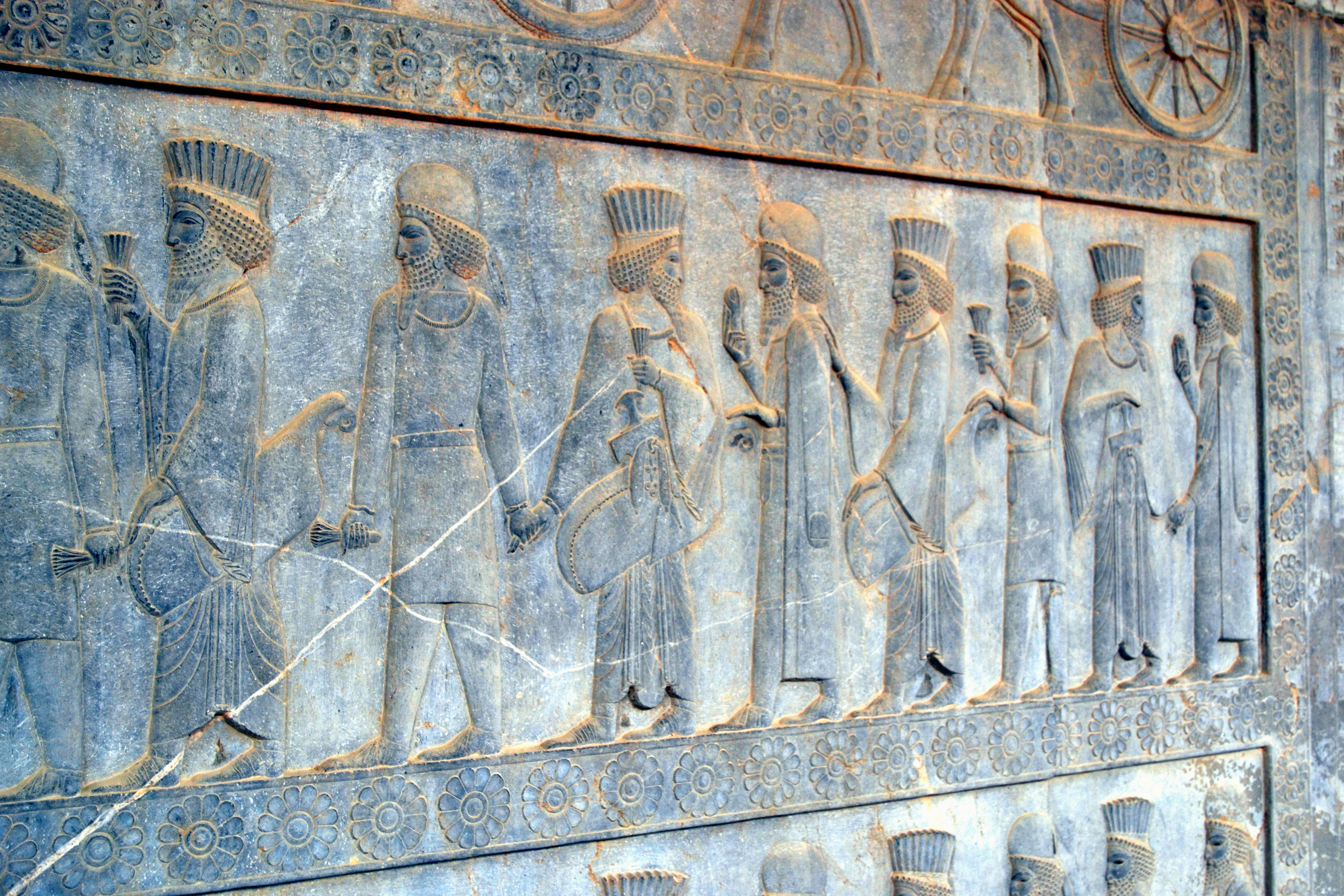
Depiction of united Medes and Persians at the Apadana, Persepolis.

Another group of theorists, making use of systems theory, looks at a civilization as a complex system, i.e., a framework by which a group of objects can be analysed that work in concert to produce some result. Civilizations can be seen as networks of cities that emerge from pre-urban cultures and are defined by the economic, political, military, diplomatic, social and cultural interactions among them. Any organization is a complex social system and a civilization is a large organization. Systems theory helps guard against superficial and misleading analogies in the study and description of civilizations.

Systems theorists look at many types of relations between cities, including economic relations, cultural exchanges and political/diplomatic/military relations. These spheres often occur on different scales. For example, trade networks were, until the nineteenth century, much larger than either cultural spheres or political spheres. Extensive trade routes, including the Silk Road through Central Asia and Indian Ocean sea routes linking the Roman Empire, Persia, India and China, were well established 2000 years ago when these civilizations scarcely shared any political, diplomatic, military, or cultural relations. The first evidence of such long-distance trade is in the ancient world. During the Uruk period, Guillermo Algaze has argued that trade relations connected Egypt, Mesopotamia, Iran and Afghanistan. Resin found later in the Royal Cemetery at Ur is suggested was traded northwards from Mozambique.

Many theorists argue that the entire world has already become integrated into a single "world system", a process known as globalization. Different civilizations and societies all over the globe are economically, politically, and even culturally interdependent in many ways. There is debate over when this integration began, and what sort of integration – cultural, technological, economic, political, or military-diplomatic – is the key indicator in determining the extent of a civilization. David Wilkinson has proposed that economic and military-diplomatic integration of the Mesopotamian and Egyptian civilizations resulted in the creation of what he calls the "Central Civilization" around 1500 BCE. Central Civilization later expanded to include the entire Middle East and Europe, and then expanded to a global scale with European colonization, integrating the Americas, Australia, China and Japan by the nineteenth century. According to Wilkinson, civilizations can be culturally heterogeneous, like the Central Civilization, or homogeneous, like the Japanese civilization. What Huntington calls the "clash of civilizations" might be characterized by Wilkinson as a clash of cultural spheres within a single global civilization. Others point to the Crusading movement as the first step in globalization. The more conventional viewpoint is that networks of societies have expanded and shrunk since ancient times, and that the current globalized economy and culture is a product of recent European colonialism.

== History ==
The notion of human history as a succession of "civilizations" is an entirely modern one. In the European Age of Discovery, emerging Modernity was put into stark contrast with the Neolithic and Mesolithic stage of the cultures of many of the peoples they encountered. Nonetheless, developments in the Neolithic stage, such as agriculture and sedentary settlement, were critical to the development of modern conceptions of civilization.

=== Indigenous communities ===
Aboriginal and Torres Strait Islander peoples have lived on the Australian continent for at least 65,000 years, representing one of the oldest recorded continuous living cultures in human history. Archaeological findings at Madjedbebe, a sandstone rock shelter in Arnhem Land near Kakadu National Park include excavations of uncovered polished stone axes, artefacts, and reflective ochre dating to its human presence.

Amerindians developed monumental urban centers, skillful agricultural systems (maize and potatoes), and sophisticated timekeeping systems based on field observations.

The Austronesians formed one of the greatest maritime civilizations in human history, originating in Taiwan and the coast of southern mainland China. They advanced outrigger canoes, catamarans, and celestial navigation, and formed an unprecedented expanse stretching from Madagascar in the west to the Pacific Islands in the east.

=== Urban Revolution ===
The Natufian culture in the Levantine corridor provides the earliest case of a Neolithic Revolution, with the planting of cereal crops attested from c. 11,000 BCE. The earliest neolithic technology and lifestyle were established first in Western Asia (for example at Göbekli Tepe, from about 9,130 BCE), later in the Yellow River and Yangtze basins in China (for example the Peiligang and Pengtoushan cultures), and from these cores spread across Eurasia. Jericho in the West Bank is considered to be the oldest city on Earth, with archaeological evidence of permanent settlement dating to 9,000 BCE. Mesopotamia is the site of the earliest civilizations developing from 7,400 years ago. This area has been evaluated by Beverley Milton-Edwards as having "inspired some of the most important developments in human history including the invention of the wheel, the building of the earliest cities and the development of written cursive script". Similar pre-civilized "neolithic revolutions" also began independently from 7,000 BCE in northwestern South America (the Caral-Supe civilization) and in Mesoamerica. The Black Sea area served as a cradle of European civilization. The site of Solnitsata – a prehistoric fortified (walled) stone settlement (prehistoric proto-city) (5500–4200 BCE) – is believed by some archaeologists to be the oldest known town in present-day Europe.

The 8.2 Kiloyear Arid Event and the 5.9 Kiloyear Inter-pluvial saw the drying out of semiarid regions and a major spread of deserts. This climate change shifted the cost-benefit ratio of endemic violence between communities, which saw the abandonment of unwalled village communities and the appearance of walled cities, seen by some as a characteristic of early civilizations.

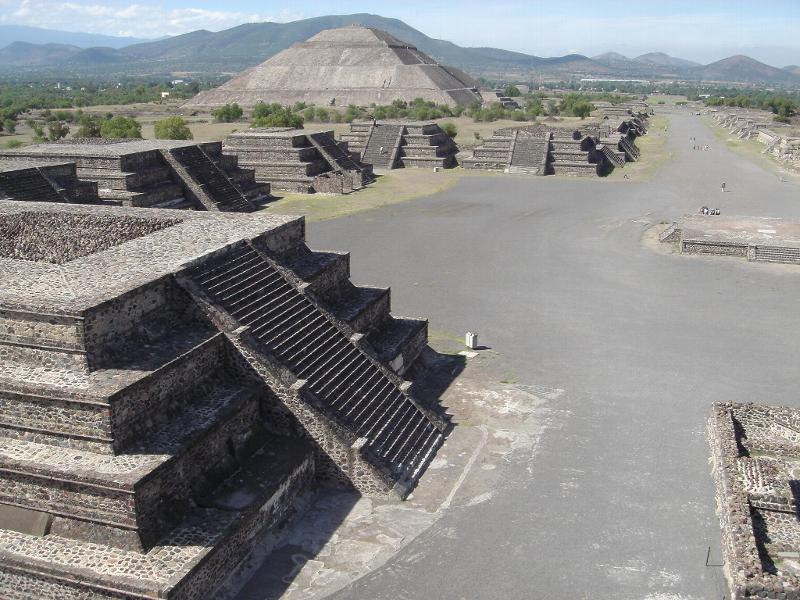
The ruins of Mesoamerican city Teotihuacan

This "urban revolution"—a term introduced by Childe in the 1930s—from the 4th millennium BCE, marked the beginning of the accumulation of transferable economic surpluses, which helped economies and cities develop. Urban revolutions were associated with the state monopoly of violence, the appearance of a warrior (or soldier) class and endemic warfare (a state of continual or frequent warfare), the rapid development of hierarchies, and the use of human sacrifice.

The civilized urban revolution in turn was dependent upon the development of sedentism, the domestication of grains, plants and animals, construction of architectural monuments, the permanence of settlements, growth of populations, evolution of languages, and development of lifestyles that facilitated economies of scale and accumulation of surplus production by particular social sectors. The transition from complex cultures to civilizations, while still disputed, seems to be associated with the development of state structures, in which power was further monopolized by an elite ruling class who practiced human sacrifice.

Towards the end of the Neolithic period, various elitist Chalcolithic civilizations began to rise in various "cradles" from around 3600 BCE beginning with Mesopotamia, expanding into large-scale kingdoms and empires in the course of the Bronze Age (Sumeria, Indus Valley Civilization, Cycladic Civilization, Early Dynastic Period of Egypt, Akkadian Empire, Old Kingdom of Egypt, Kingdom of Kerma, Minoan civilization, Neo-Sumerian Empire, Xia dynasty, Mycenaean Greece, Shang dynasty, Assyria, Babylonia, Lagash, Hittite Empire, and to some degree the territorial expansions of the Elamites, Hurrians, Phoenicians, Canaanites, Amorites and Ebla).

Outside the Old World, development took place independently in the Pre-Columbian Americas. Urbanization in the Caral-Supe civilization in what is now coastal Peru began about 3500 BCE. In North America, the Olmec civilization emerged about 1200 BCE; the oldest known Mayan city, located in what is now Guatemala, dates to about 750 BCE. and Teotihuacan (near the modern Mexico City) was one of the largest cities in the world in 350 CE, with a population of about 125,000.

=== Axial Age ===
The Bronze Age collapse was followed by the Iron Age around 1200 BCE, during which a number of new civilizations emerged, culminating in a period from the 8th to the 3rd century BCE which Karl Jaspers termed the Axial Age, presented as a critical transitional phase leading to classical antiquity and thus to Western civilization, as well as to classical eras in various other regions of Eurasia and Africa.

=== Post-classical era ===
The collapse of centralized Mediterranean authority, which triggered the fall of the Western Roman Empire, was followed by the post-classical period during which the world transitioned to new social networks. The period saw an era of massive global realignment, the transformation and evolution of several existing civilizations, and the emergence and rise of several others. It spanned from the 5th to 15th centuries, roughly coterminous with the Western Middle Ages, and laid the groundwork for the modern world.

=== Modernity ===
A major social and cultural transition to modernity began approximately 1500 CE in Western Europe, and the resulting period saw new approaches to science, technology, economics, religion, military science, diplomacy, politics, and law, as well as several other domains, spread rapidly around the world, incorporating earlier civilizations into the industrial society and post-industrial society of the present day. The period saw the development of centralized nation-states and globalization of societies transitioned from pre-industrial empires into a global network.

== Fall of civilizations ==
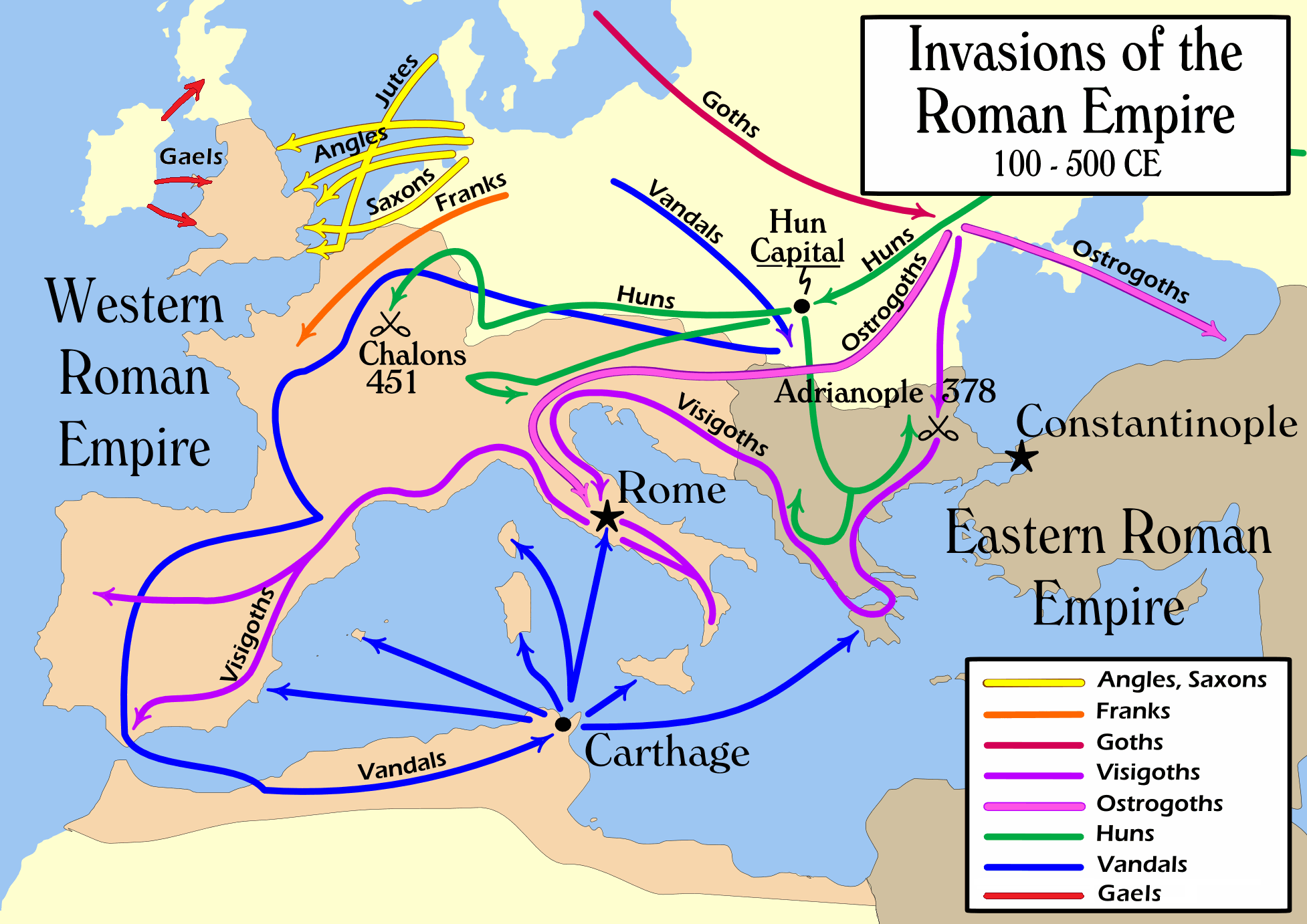
Barbarian invasions played an important role in the fall of the Roman Empire.

Civilizations are traditionally understood as ending in one of two ways; either through incorporation into another expanding civilization (e.g. as Ancient Egypt was incorporated into Hellenistic Greek, and subsequently Roman civilizations), or by collapsing and reverting to a simpler form of living, as happens in so-called Dark Ages.

There have been many explanations put forward for the collapse of civilization. Some focus on historical examples, and others on general theory.

- Ibn Khaldun's Muqaddimah influenced theories of the analysis, growth, and decline of the Islamic civilization. He suggested repeated invasions from nomadic peoples and limited development could lead to social collapse.
- Edward Gibbon's work The Decline and Fall of the Roman Empire is a well-known and detailed analysis of the fall of Roman civilization. Gibbon suggested the final act of the collapse of Rome was the fall of Constantinople to the Ottoman Turks in 1453 CE. For Gibbon, "The decline of Rome was the natural and inevitable effect of immoderate greatness. Prosperity ripened the principle of decay; the cause of the destruction multiplied with the extent of conquest; and, as soon as time or accident had removed the artificial supports, the stupendous fabric yielded to the pressure of its own weight. The story of the ruin is simple and obvious; and instead of inquiring why the Roman Empire was destroyed, we should rather be surprised that it has subsisted for so long".
- Theodor Mommsen in his History of Rome suggested Rome collapsed with the collapse of the Western Roman Empire in 476 CE and he also tended towards a biological analogy of "genesis", "growth", "senescence", "collapse" and "decay".
- Oswald Spengler, in his Decline of the West rejected Petrarch's chronological division, and suggested that there had been only eight "mature civilizations". Growing cultures, he argued, tend to develop into imperialistic civilizations, which expand and ultimately collapse, with democratic forms of government ushering in plutocracy and ultimately imperialism.
- Arnold J. Toynbee in his A Study of History suggested that there had been a much larger number of civilizations, including a small number of arrested civilizations, and that all civilizations tended to go through the cycle identified by Mommsen. The cause of the fall of a civilization occurred when a cultural elite became a parasitic elite, leading to the rise of internal and external proletariats.
- Joseph Tainter in The Collapse of Complex Societies suggested that there were diminishing returns to complexity, due to which, as states achieved a maximum permissible complexity, they would decline when further increases actually produced a negative return. Tainter suggested that Rome achieved this figure in the 2nd century CE.
- Jared Diamond in his 2005 book Collapse: How Societies Choose to Fail or Succeed suggests five major reasons for the collapse of 41 studied cultures: environmental damage, such as deforestation and soil erosion; climate change; dependence upon long-distance trade for needed resources; increasing levels of internal and external violence, such as war or invasion; and societal responses to internal and environmental problems.
- Peter Turchin in his Historical Dynamics and Andrey Korotayev et al. in their Introduction to Social Macrodynamics, Secular Cycles, and Millennial Trends suggest a number of mathematical models describing collapse of agrarian civilizations. For example, the basic logic of Turchin's "fiscal-demographic" model can be outlined as follows: during the initial phase of a sociodemographic cycle we observe relatively high levels of per capita production and consumption, which leads not only to relatively high population growth rates, but also to relatively high rates of surplus production. As a result, during this phase the population can afford to pay taxes without great problems, the taxes are quite easily collectible, and the population growth is accompanied by the growth of state revenues. During the intermediate phase, the increasing population growth leads to the decrease of per capita production and consumption levels, it becomes more and more difficult to collect taxes, and state revenues stop growing, whereas the state expenditures grow due to the growth of the population controlled by the state. As a result, during this phase the state starts experiencing considerable fiscal problems. During the final pre-collapse phases the overpopulation leads to further decrease of per capita production, the surplus production further decreases, state revenues shrink, but the state needs more and more resources to control the growing (though with lower and lower rates) population. Eventually this leads to famines, epidemics, state breakdown, and demographic and civilization collapse.
- Peter Heather argues in his book The Fall of the Roman Empire: a New History of Rome and the Barbarians that this civilization did not end for moral or economic reasons, but because centuries of contact with barbarians across the frontier generated its own nemesis by making them a more sophisticated and dangerous adversary. The fact that Rome needed to generate ever greater revenues to equip and re-equip armies that were for the first time repeatedly defeated in the field, led to the dismemberment of the Empire. Although this argument is specific to Rome, it can also be applied to the Asiatic Empire of the Egyptians, to the Han and Tang dynasties of China, to the Muslim Abbasid Caliphate and others.
- Bryan Ward-Perkins, in his book The Fall of Rome and the End of Civilization, argues from mostly archaeological evidence that the collapse of Roman civilization in western Europe had deleterious impacts on the living standards of the population, unlike some historians who downplay this. The collapse of complex society meant that even basic plumbing for the elite disappeared from the continent for 1,000 years. Similar impacts have been postulated for the Dark Age after the Late Bronze Age collapse in the Eastern Mediterranean, the collapse of the Maya, on Easter Island and elsewhere.
- Arthur Demarest argues in Ancient Maya: The Rise and Fall of a Rainforest Civilization, using a holistic perspective to the most recent evidence from archaeology, paleoecology, and epigraphy, that no one explanation is sufficient but that a series of erratic, complex events, including loss of soil fertility, drought and rising levels of internal and external violence led to the disintegration of the courts of Mayan kingdoms, which began a spiral of decline and decay. He argues that the collapse of the Maya has lessons for civilization today.
- Jeffrey A. McNeely has recently suggested that "a review of historical evidence shows that past civilizations have tended to over-exploit their forests, and that such abuse of important resources has been a significant factor in the decline of the over-exploiting society".
- Thomas Homer-Dixon considers the fall in the energy return on investments. The energy expended to energy yield ratio is central to limiting the survival of civilizations. The degree of social complexity is associated strongly, he suggests, with the amount of disposable energy environmental, economic and technological systems allow. When this amount decreases civilizations either have to access new energy sources or collapse.
- Feliks Koneczny in his work "On the Plurality of Civilizations" calls his study the science on civilizations. He asserts that civilizations fall not because they must or there exist some cyclical or a "biological" life span and that there stil exist two ancient civilizations – Brahmin-Hindu and Chinese – which are not ready to fall any time soon. Koneczny claimed that civilizations cannot be mixed into hybrids, an inferior civilization when given equal rights within a highly developed civilization will overcome it. One of Koneczny's claims in his study on civilizations is that "a person cannot be civilized in two or more ways" without falling into what he calls an "abcivilized state" (as in abnormal). He also stated that when two or more civilizations exist next to one another and as long as they are vital, they will be in an existential combat imposing its own "method of organizing social life" upon the other. Absorbing alien "method of organizing social life" that is civilization and giving it equal rights yields a process of decay and decomposition.

== Future ==
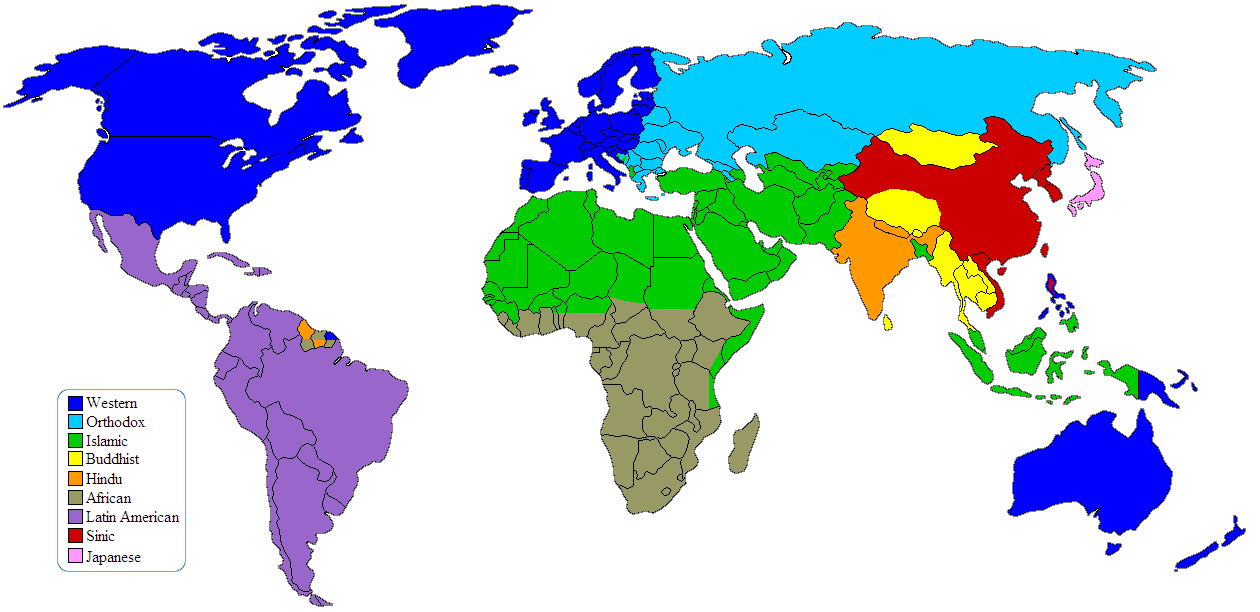
A world map of major civilizations according to the political hypothesis Clash of Civilizations by Samuel P. Huntington

According to political scientist Samuel P. Huntington, the 21st century will be characterized by a clash of civilizations, which he believes will replace the conflicts between nation-states and ideologies that were prominent in the 19th and 20th centuries. However, this viewpoint has been strongly challenged by others such as Edward Said, Muhammed Asadi and Amartya Sen. Ronald Inglehart and Pippa Norris have argued that the "true clash of civilizations" between the Muslim world and the West is caused by the Muslim rejection of the West's more liberal sexual values, rather than a difference in political ideology, although they note that this lack of tolerance is likely to lead to an eventual rejection of (true) democracy. In Identity and Violence Sen questions if people should be divided along the lines of a supposed "civilization", defined by religion and culture only. He argues that this ignores the many others identities that make up people and leads to a focus on differences.

Cultural historian Morris Berman argues in Dark Ages America: the End of Empire that in the corporate consumerist United States, the very factors that once propelled it to greatness―extreme individualism, territorial and economic expansion, and the pursuit of material wealth―have pushed the United States across a critical threshold where collapse is inevitable. Politically associated with over-reach, and as a result of the environmental exhaustion and polarization of wealth between rich and poor, he concludes the current system is fast arriving at a situation where continuation of the existing system saddled with huge deficits and a hollowed-out economy is physically, socially, economically and politically impossible. Although developed in much more depth, Berman's thesis is similar in some ways to that of Urban Planner, Jane Jacobs who argues that the five pillars of United States culture are in serious decay: community and family; higher education; the effective practice of science; taxation and government; and the self-regulation of the learned professions. The corrosion of these pillars, Jacobs argues, is linked to societal ills such as environmental crisis, racism and the growing gulf between rich and poor.

Cultural critic and author Derrick Jensen argues that modern civilization is directed towards the domination of the environment and humanity itself in an intrinsically harmful, unsustainable, and self-destructive fashion. Defending his definition both linguistically and historically, he defines civilization as "a culture... that both leads to and emerges from the growth of cities", with "cities" defined as "people living more or less permanently in one place in densities high enough to require the routine importation of food and other necessities of life". This need for civilizations to import ever more resources, he argues, stems from their over-exploitation and diminution of their own local resources. Therefore, civilizations inherently adopt imperialist and expansionist policies and, to maintain these, highly militarized, hierarchically structured, and coercion-based cultures and lifestyles.

The Kardashev scale classifies civilizations based on their level of technological advancement, specifically measured by the amount of energy a civilization is able to harness. The scale is only hypothetical, but it puts energy consumption in a cosmic perspective. The Kardashev scale makes provisions for civilizations far more technologically advanced than any currently known to exist.

An alternative view suggests that Kardashev’s idea of ever increasing energy consumption may itself reflect a relatively crude phase of our technological development, rather than a universal principle. Future civilization will instead be characterized by technological minimalism, in which highly advanced society seeks to maximize effectiveness while minimizing energy use. Rather than pursuing ever-increasing levels of power consumption, such civilization might focus on optimization, efficiency, and extreme miniaturization. Mastery of quantum-scale engineering could allow them to perform complex functions using only negligible amounts of energy. A sufficiently advanced technological society might also choose to separate its technological systems from the surrounding environment. Viewed from interstellar distances, such a world could appear pristine—supporting a flourishing natural biosphere, with little or no visible trace of industry or artificial modification.

== Non-human civilizations ==
The current scientific consensus is that human beings are the only animal species with the cognitive ability to create civilizations that has emerged on Earth. A recent thought experiment, the silurian hypothesis, however, considers whether it would "be possible to detect an industrial civilization in the geological record" given the paucity of geological information about eras before the quaternary.

Astronomers speculate about the existence of communicating alien intelligent civilizations within and beyond the Milky Way galaxy, usually using variants of the Drake equation. They conduct searches for such intelligences – such as for technological traces, called "technosignatures". The proposed proto-scientific field "xenoarchaeology" is concerned with the study of artifact remains of non-human civilizations to reconstruct and interpret past lives of alien societies if such get discovered and confirmed scientifically.

== See also ==
- Anthropocentrism
- Built environment
- Civil society
- Civilization state
- Colony
- Cultural intelligence
- Cultural invention
- History of art
- History of communication
- Intelligentsia
- Intercultural communication
- Modus vivendi
- Socialization
- Sociocultural evolution
- Sociocultural system
- State formation
- Urban development
- World citizen

== Bibliography ==
- Ankerl, Guy (2000) [2000]. Global communication without universal civilization. INU societal research. Vol. 1: Coexisting contemporary civilizations: Arabo-Muslim, Bharati, Chinese, and Western. Geneva: INU Press. ISBN 978-2-88155-004-1.
- Brinton, Crane; et al. (1984). A History of Civilization: Prehistory to 1715 (6th ed.). Englewood Cliffs, N.J.: Prentice Hall. ISBN 978-0-13-389866-8.
- Casson, Lionel (1994). Ships and Seafaring in Ancient Times. London: British Museum Press. ISBN 978-0-7141-1735-5.
- Chisholm, Jane; Anne Millard (1991). Early Civilization. illus. Ian Jackson. London: Usborne. ISBN 978-1-58086-022-2.
- Collcutt, Martin; Marius Jansen; Isao Kumakura (1988). Cultural Atlas of Japan. New York: Facts on File. ISBN 978-0-8160-1927-4.
- Drews, Robert (1993). The End of the Bronze Age: Changes in Warfare and the Catastrophe ca. 1200 B.C. Princeton: Princeton University Press. ISBN 978-0-691-04811-6.
- Edey, Maitland A. (1974). The Sea Traders. New York: Time-Life Books. ISBN 978-0-7054-0060-2.
- Elles, James (1908). The influence of commerce on civilization: the Joseph Fisher lecture on commerce delivered at the University of Adelaide by J. Currie Elles esq., April 23rd, 1908 (1st ed.). Adelaide: W. K. Thomas & Co. Wikidata Q106369892 – via Wikisource.
- Fairservis, Walter A. Jr. (1975). The Threshold of Civilization: An Experiment in Prehistory. New York: Scribner. ISBN 978-0-684-12775-0.
- Fernández-Armesto, Felipe (2000). Civilizations. London: Macmillan. ISBN 978-0-333-90171-7.
- Ferrill, Arther (1985). The Origins of War: From the Stone Age to Alexander the Great. New York: Thames and Hudson. ISBN 978-0-500-25093-8.
- Fitzgerald, C.P. (1969). The Horizon History of China. New York: American Heritage. ISBN 978-0-8281-0005-2.
- Fuller, J.F.C. (1954–1957). A Military History of the Western World. 3 vols. New York: Funk & Wagnalls.
  1. From the Earliest Times to the Battle of Lepanto. ISBN 0-306-80304-6 (1987 reprint).
  2. From the Defeat of the Spanish Armada to the Battle of Waterloo. ISBN 0-306-80305-4 (1987 reprint).
  3. From the American Civil War to the End of World War II. ISBN 0-306-80306-2 (1987 reprint).
- Gowlett, John (1984). Ascent to Civilization. London: Collins. ISBN 978-0-00-217090-1.
- Hawkes, Jacquetta (1968). Dawn of the Gods. London: Chatto & Windus. ISBN 978-0-7011-1332-2.
- Hawkes, Jacquetta; David Trump (1993) [1976]. The Atlas of Early Man. London: Dorling Kindersley. ISBN 978-0-312-09746-2.
- Hicks, Jim (1974). The Empire Builders. New York: Time-Life Books.
- Hicks, Jim (1975). The Persians. New York: Time-Life Books.
- Johnson, Paul (1987). A History of the Jews. London: Weidenfeld and Nicolson. ISBN 978-0-297-79091-4.
- Jensen, Derrick (2006). Endgame. New York: Seven Stories Press. ISBN 978-1-58322-730-5.
- Keppie, Lawrence (1984). The Making of the Roman Army: From Republic to Empire. Totowa, N.J.: Barnes & Noble. ISBN 978-0-389-20447-3.
- Korotayev, Andrey, World Religions and Social Evolution of the Old World Oikumene Civilizations: A Cross-Cultural Perspective. Lewiston, New York: Edwin Mellen Press, 2004. ISBN 0-7734-6310-0
- Kradin, Nikolay. Archaeological Criteria of Civilization. Social Evolution & History, Vol. 5, No 1 (2006): 89–108. ISSN 1681-4363.
- Lansing, Elizabeth (1971). The Sumerians: Inventors and Builders. New York: McGraw-Hill. ISBN 978-0-07-036357-1.
- Lee, Ki-Baik (1984). A New History of Korea. trans. Edward W. Wagner, with Edward J. Shultz. Cambridge: Harvard University Press. ISBN 978-0-674-61575-5.
- Morris, Ian (2013). The Measure of Civilization: how Social Development Decides the Fate of Nations. Princeton: Princeton University Press. ISBN 978-0-691-15568-5.
- Nahm, Andrew C. (1983). A Panorama of 5000 Years: Korean History. Elizabeth, N.J.: Hollym International. ISBN 978-0-930878-23-8.
- Oliphant, Margaret (1992). The Atlas of the Ancient World: Charting the Great Civilizations of the Past. London: Ebury. ISBN 978-0-09-177040-2.
- Rogerson, John (1985). Atlas of the Bible. New York: Infobase Publishing. ISBN 978-0-8160-1206-0.
- Sandall, Roger (2001). The Culture Cult: Designer Tribalism and Other Essays. Boulder, Colo.: Westview. ISBN 978-0-8133-3863-7.
- Sansom, George (1958). A History of Japan: To 1334. Stanford: Stanford University Press. ISBN 978-0-8047-0523-3.
- Southworth, John Van Duyn (1968). The Ancient Fleets: The Story of Naval Warfare Under Oars, 2600 B.C.–1597 A.D. New York: Twayne.
- Thomas, Hugh (1981). An Unfinished History of the World (rev. ed.). London: Pan. ISBN 978-0-330-26458-7.
- Cotterell, Yong Yap; Cotterell, Arthur (1975). The Early Civilization of China. New York: Putnam. ISBN 978-0-399-11595-0.
- Yurdusev, A. Nuri (2003). International Relations and the Philosophy of History. doi:10.1057/9781403938404. ISBN 978-1-349-40304-2.
