= Ancient Maya: The Rise and Fall of a Rainforest Civilization =

Book by Arthur Demarest

- Front cover
- Author: Arthur Demarest
- Language: English
- Subject: Ancient history
- Publisher: Cambridge University Press
- English publication date: 9 December 2004
- ISBN: 978-0-521-59224-6

Ancient Maya: The Rise and Fall of a Rainforest Civilization is an archaeological book about the ancient Maya civilization by Arthur Demarest, published by Cambridge University Press in 2004.

The book discusses the complex lifestyle and political history of the Maya states, from the first to eighth centuries. It also gives an explanation of the mystery of the ninth-century abandonment of most of the great rainforest cities. It concludes that the Maya civilization has lessons for modern civilization.

The author is the Ingram Professor of Anthropology at Vanderbilt University in Tennessee.

== Reviews ==
- Scott L. Fedick (2007). Review: Ancient Maya: The Rise and Fall of a Rainforest Civilization by Arthur Demarest. Latin American Antiquity 18 (2): 223–225 JSTOR 25063107 doi:10.2307/25063107
- Anna C. L. Pineda (2016). Review: Ancient Maya: The Rise and Fall of a Rainforest Civilization Hukay: Journal for Archaeological Research in Asia and the Pacific 9: 109–110
- New Archaeological Books and Journals. Journal of Field Archaeology 30 (1): 95-98 (2005) JSTOR 40025828 (short review)
