= Logierait =

Coordinates: 56.647558°N 3.679711°W

Logierait: Scottish Gaelic: Lagan
- Location within Perth and Kinross
- OS grid reference: NN971519
- Council area: Perth and Kinross
- Lieutenancy area: Perth and Kinross
- Country: Scotland
- Sovereign state: United Kingdom
- Post town: PITLOCHRY
- Postcode district: PH16
- Dialling code: 01796
- Police: Scotland
- Fire: Scottish
- Ambulance: Scottish
- UK Parliament: Angus and Perthshire Glens
- Scottish Parliament: Perthshire North

Logierait (/ˈloʊɡiˌreɪt/; Scottish Gaelic: Lagan) is a village and parish in Atholl, Scotland. It is situated at the confluence of the rivers Tay and Tummel, 500 metres (1/4 mile) west of the A9 road in Perth and Kinross.

Its name originates from Gaelic Lagan Ràit, meaning the little hollow of the earth-walled fort, though in recent Gaelic it is now simply called Lagan.

Nearby was an ancient ash tree, the Dule Tree of the district from which thieves and murderers were hanged.

Above the village is the site of a major early royal castle, perhaps the 'rath' of the place-name, still marked by a large ditch. This was probably the seat or caput of the mormaers of Atholl. The ancient promontory fort is marked by a huge 'Celtic' cross, a monument to the 6th Duke of Atholl (1814–1864).

The church is of early Christian origin, as shown by the presence of two Pictish cross-slabs: one in the churchyard, discovered in or before 1878; the other, identified in 1989, in the church. Both are classified as Class II Pictish stones (dressed stones, relief carving). The church's dedication is to Coeddi, Bishop of Iona in the early 8th century, perhaps the founder of the church here. The present church building, however, dates from the early 19th century, and is protected as a category B listed building.

The school dates from 1863 and was also built by the 6th Duke. It was designed by the Edinburgh architects R & R Dickson.

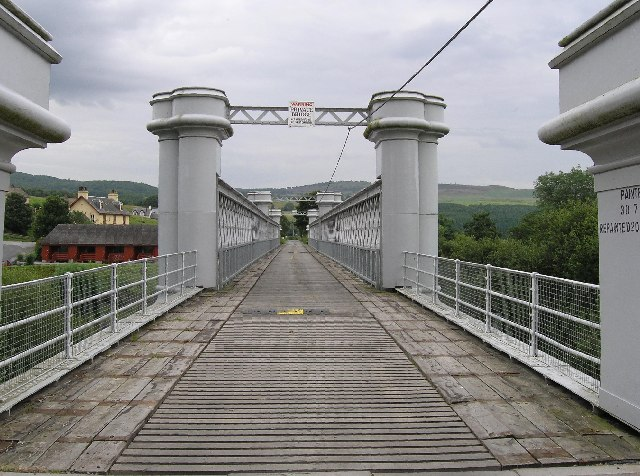
Old railway bridge across the Tay at Logierait

== Notable residents ==
- Adam Ferguson, a leading figure of the Scottish Enlightenment was born and raised in Logierait.
- John McIntosh (1796–1853) Canadian politician born in Logierait
- Alexander Mackenzie (1822–1892), Canada's second Prime Minister, born in Logierait
