= Journal of Field Archaeology =

- Discipline: Archaeology
- Language: English
- Edited by: Christina Luke

Publication details
- History: 1974–present
- Publisher: Routledge
- Frequency: 8/year
- Open access: Hybrid

Standard abbreviations
- ISO 4: J. Field Archaeol.

Indexing
- CODEN: JFARDK
- ISSN: 0093-4690 (print); 2042-4582 (web)
- LCCN: 2002227391
- JSTOR: 00934690
- OCLC no.: 51213011

Links
- Journal homepage; Online access; Online archive

The Journal of Field Archaeology is a peer-reviewed academic journal that covers archaeological fieldwork (excavations, surveys, and related laboratory research) from any part of the world. It is published by Routledge on behalf of Boston University and its editor-in-chief is Christina Luke.

The journal was established in 1974 by the Association for Field Archaeology. Its founding editor James R. Wiseman, described its purpose as promoting international and interdisciplinary research in archaeology, as opposed to other regional or period-specific journals, and it has been cited as an example of a journal that bridges the divide between anthropological archaeology and classical archaeology. Originally published internally by Boston University, it moved to Maney Publishing in 2010, and to Routledge in 2016 (when the company acquired Maney).

A 2002 study found no evidence of a gender citation gap in papers published in the journal between 1989 and 1998, unlike in some other major anthropology journals.

== Abstracting and indexing ==
The journal indexed and abstracted in the Arts and Humanities Citation Index, Scopus, EBSCO databases, FRANCIS, the International Bibliography of Periodical Literature, the International Bibliography of the Social Sciences, ProQuest databases, L'Année philologique, Art Abstracts, Index Islamicus, Anthropological Literature, Modern Language Association Database, and Dialnet.
