= An Essay on the History of Civil Society =

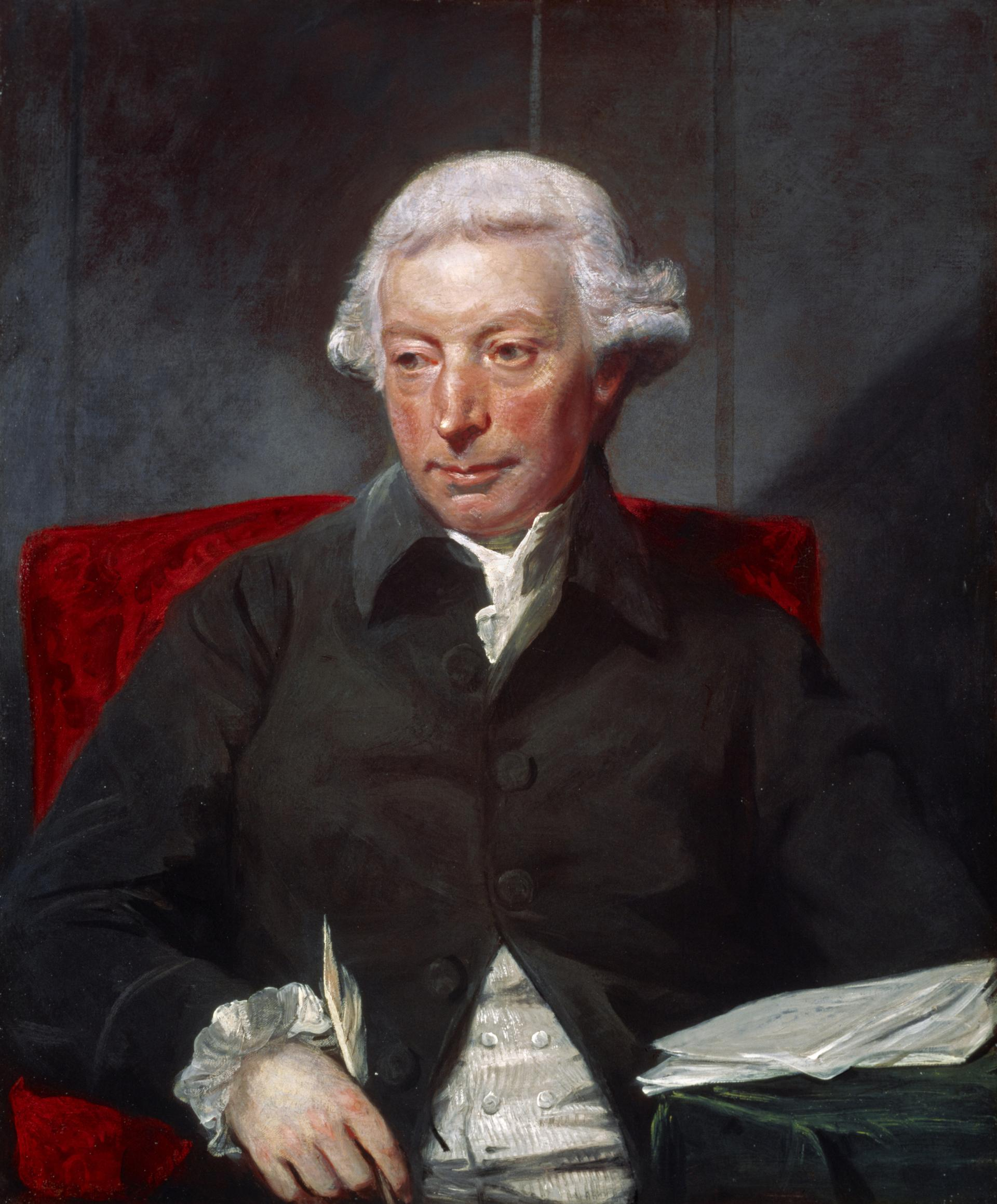
Adam Ferguson

An Essay on the History of Civil Society is a book by Scottish Enlightenment philosopher Adam Ferguson, first published in 1767. The Essay established Ferguson's reputation in Britain and throughout Europe. In the second section of the third part of the Essay, while discussing the history of political establishments, Ferguson states "Every step and every movement of the multitude, even in what are termed enlightened ages, are made with equal blindness to the future; and nations stumble upon establishments, which are indeed the result of human action, but not the execution of any human design."

== Contents ==
Part I. Of the General Characteristics of Human Nature.
Part II. Of the History of Rude Nations.
Part III. Of the History of Policy and Arts.
Part IV. Of Consequences that result from the Advancement of Civil and Commercial arts.
Part V. Of the Decline of Nations.
Part VI. Of Corruption and Political Slavery.

== Reception ==
The Essay was critically acclaimed upon publication with a wide readership for about thirty years after it was published. Voltaire praised Ferguson for "civilizing the Russians" as it was being taught in the University of Moscow.

David Hume, a friend of Ferguson's and an admirer of his earlier Essay on Refinement (1759), disliked the book. Ferguson's writings on the division of labour in Part IV influenced Karl Marx.
