= Cultural invention =

New cultural belief or practice adopted in response to changing circumstances

A cultural invention is any innovation developed by people. Cultural inventions include sets of behaviour adopted by groups of people. They are perpetuated by being passed on to others within the group or outside it. They are also passed on to future groups and generations. Sources of cultural invention can either come from outside a specific group or from within that group.

Allan Hanson, a postmodern anthropologist, believed that the analytical purpose of studying cultural inventions was not to uncover which portions of a culture's belief systems are invented, but rather to study how cultural inventions become accepted as authentic within groups. This notion has been met with criticism from within the anthropological community as well as from outside sources, and has been referred to as both politically revisionist and anti-native. The fear is that viewing cultural invention as a process which leads to something authentic and widely accepted may undermine indigenous people's traditions in addition to questioning the authority they have over their own culture.

== Examples ==
Examples of areas where cultural inventions may take place include:

- Languages
- Legal systems
- Political systems
- Scientific method
- Sports
- Social institutions
- Belief systems
- Science, technology, engineering and mathematics

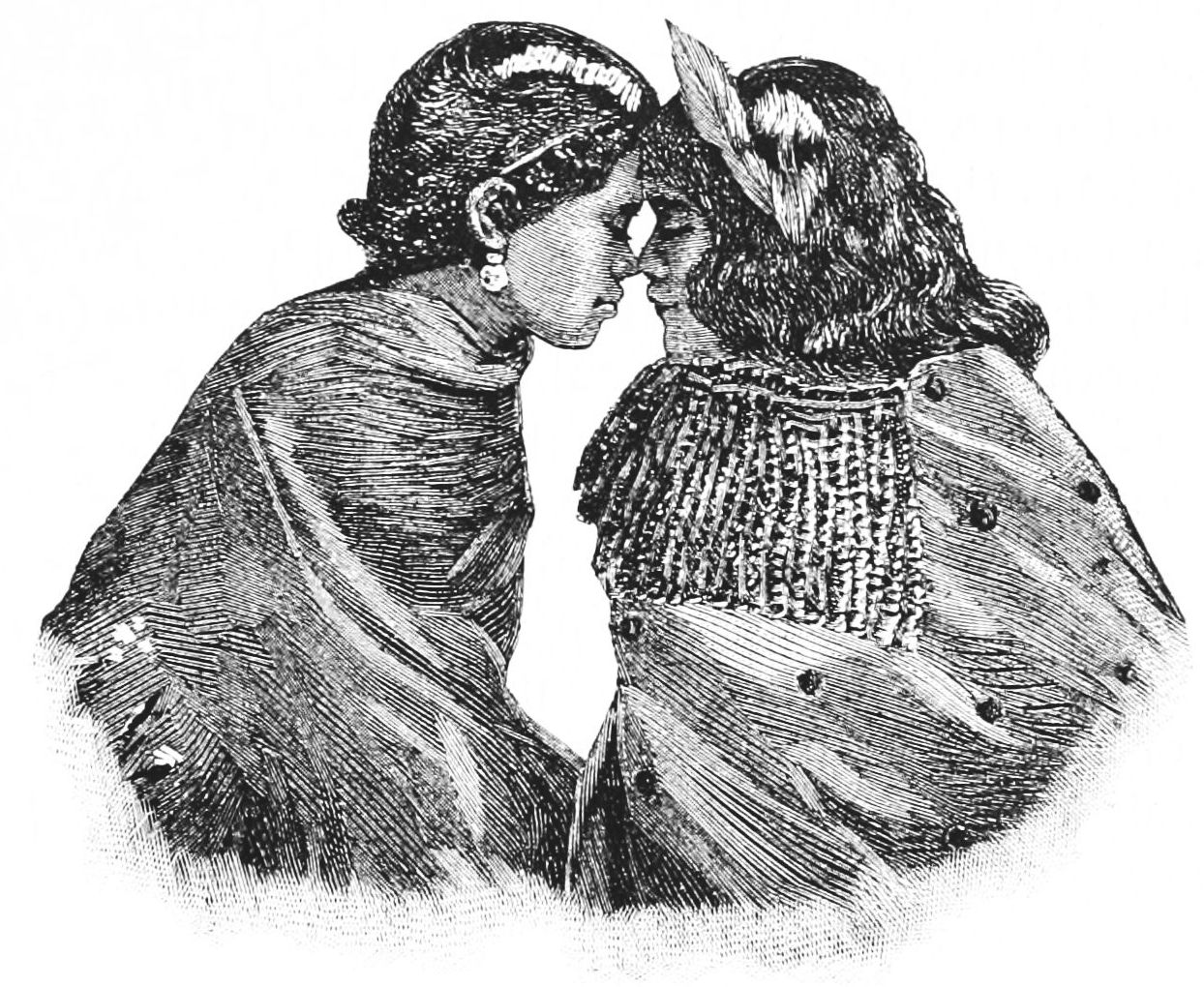
PSM V42 D809 Maori salutation

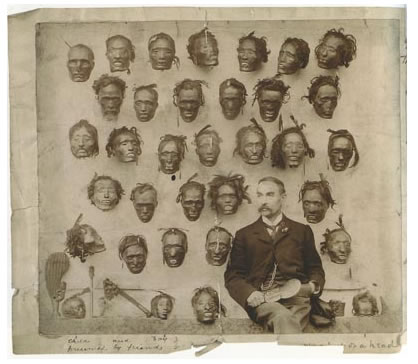
Robley with his mokomokai

== Cultural transmission ==
One way that cultural inventions can be spread is through cultural transmission, the means by which culturally specific ideas and patterns of behavior are shared and become cultural reality. According to Marc J. Swartz, people of status within society play an important role in deciding what is understood as cultural reality. Such people have the correct kinds of skills and knowledge within society to help transmit ideas in such a way that they are accepted by society at large, which is one method by which cultural inventions can become cultural realities.

== Case study: Maori ==
Allan Hanson proposed that several aspects of Maori culture had been invented by European scholars who were accustomed to analytical frameworks focused on long-distance migration and diffusion. Because of this, he believed that European scholars constructed the notion that a "Great Fleet", headed by a man named Kupe from a neighboring island, who was responsible for the initial discovery and peopling of New Zealand. Although Maori ancestors most likely arrived in canoes from nearby islands, Hanson believed that the account of the Great Fleet was created to simplify various Maori traditions into a single tradition.

Additionally, to make the Maori seem more elevated in European eyes, scholars may have invented a cult to the named Io, who was thought to be a supreme being that controlled all the other gods in the Maori pantheon. The story of Io creating the world is so similar to that of the Book of Genesis in the Bible, that it is believed to have been a European invention. Hanson asserted that those and other elements of Maori tradition were incorporated and taken to be true by the Maori and that they have been passed down through generations by way of oral tradition. According to Hanson, "Io and the Great Fleet have been incorporated into Maori lore and are passed down from elders to juniors in storytelling, oratory, and other Maori contexts".

== See also ==
- Creativity techniques
