= List of Category A listed buildings in the Old Town, Edinburgh =

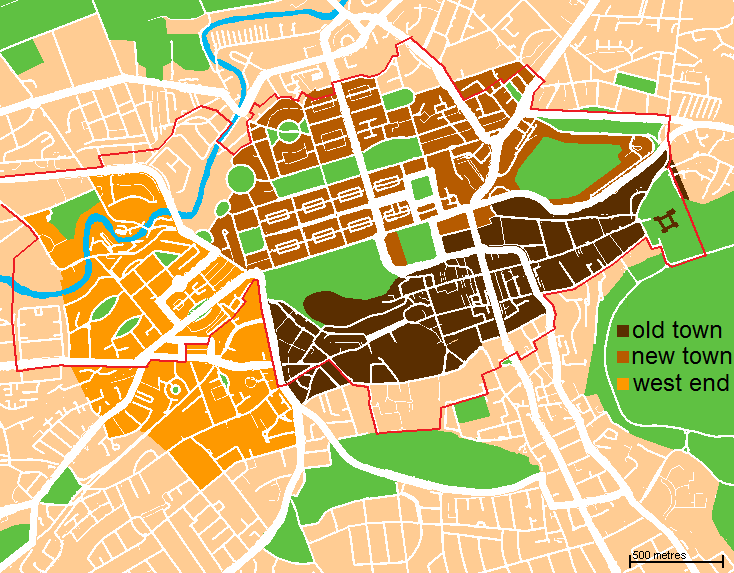
The Old Town, shown in dark brown

This is a list of Category A listed buildings in the Old Town of Edinburgh, Scotland. For the main list, see List of Category A listed buildings in Edinburgh.

== Boundaries ==
The Old Town is defined here as the area around the Royal Mile, shown in dark brown on the map to the right. As well as the Royal Mile, it encompasses the Grassmarket, Cowgate, and Canongate areas, along with a number of areas with predominantly more modern construction.

- to the north, the southern edge of Princes Street Gardens, Waterloo Place and Regent Road

This excludes the lower parts of the Mound, with a boundary running approximately along Market Street. This omits Princes Street Gardens and Waverley Station, as well as the Balmoral Hotel and the old Post Office building at the north end of North Bridge. However, other structures on the southern side of Waterloo Place/Regent Road are included.

- to the west, Lothian Road

The north-western boundary point is the junction of Lothian Road and King's Stables Road, with all structures east of Lothian Road included. The boundary runs south along Lothian Road to its junction with Lauriston Place at Tollcross. The southwestern corner - between Lauriston Place and East Fountainbridge, up to Lady Lawson Road - is considered the Old Town for the purposes of this list, but is not included in the UNESCO "Edinburgh Old and New Towns" World Heritage Site listing.

- to the east, Holyrood and the Queen's Park

The northeastern limit is Regent Road Park, at the junction of Regent Road and the southern end of Easter Road. The eastern boundary runs down Abbeyhill to the Palace of Holyroodhouse - which is included in the Old Town - to the southeastern limit, approximately at the new Scottish Parliament building.

- to the south, Lauriston Place, South College Street, Drummond Street, and Holyrood Road

From the southeastern limit, the boundary runs west along Holyrood Road to the junction with the Pleasance, moves south slightly, and again runs west along Drummond Street and South College Street, along the southern edge of the Old College building. The boundary then follows Lothian Street, Teviot Place, and Lauriston Place to its junction at Tollcross. The Lauriston Place boundary means that the Old Town includes George Heriot's and the College of Art, but does not include the old Royal Infirmary site.

== Listed buildings ==
Name	Location	Date listed	Geo-coordinates	Notes	LB number	Image
Edinburgh City Chambers	253 High Street	14 December 1970	55°57′01″N 3°11′25″W	John Adam and John Fergus, 1754-1761, with later alterations and additions including Robert Morham, 1898-1904 and Ebenezer J MacRae, 1930-1934.	17597	Upload another image See more images
Trinity College Church Apse	Chalmer's Close (between High Street and Jeffrey Street)	14 December 1970	55°57′04″N 3°11′08″W	John Lessels, 1872, incorporating parts of Trinity College Church by John Halkerston, 1460-1531, (demolished 1848 and relocated to present site, 1872).	25747	Upload another image See more images
Kirk of the Canongate		14 December 1970	55°57′06″N 3°10′46″W	James Smith, 1688-1690 with later alterations.	26823	Upload another image See more images
Greyfriars Kirk	Greyfriars Place	14 December 1970	55°56′48″N 3°11′32″W	Building begun 1601, opened 1620; possibly incorporating earlier fabric.	27018	Upload another image See more images
Greyfriars Kirkyard	Greyfriars Place	14 December 1970	55°56′45″N 3°11′32″W	Burial ground from 1562.	27029	Upload another image See more images
Magdalene Chapel	41 Cowgate	14 December 1970	55°56′53″N 3°11′33″W	John Tailefer, mason and Robert Wilson, wright, 1541-1544, with later alterations and additions, including Richard Crichton.	27110	Upload another image See more images
St Giles' Cathedral	High Street	14 December 1970	55°56′58″N 3°11′27″W	1385-1410 possibly incorporating earlier fabric and with significant later alterations and additions, including exterior re-facing in smooth ashlar by William Burn, 1829-1833 and Thistle Chapel addition by Robert Lorimer, 1910.	27381	Upload another image See more images
The Hub Festival Centre	348-350 Castlehill	14 December 1970	55°56′56″N 3°11′43″W	James Gillespie Graham and AWN Pugin, 1839-1844; Hardy and Wight, 1893; Benjamin Tindall Architects, 1999.	27542	Upload another image See more images
General Assembly Hall of the Church of Scotland	The Mound	14 December 1970	55°56′58″N 3°11′43″W	William H Playfair, 1845-1850; David Bryce, 1858-1859; Sydney Mitchell, 1899; JM Dick Peddie, 1885 and 1901-1903.	27689	Upload another image See more images
Tron Kirk	High Street	14 December 1970	55°57′00″N 3°11′16″W	John Mylne and John Scott, 1637-1647 with later alterations by John Baxter, 1785; R and R Dickson, 1828; Robert Rowand Anderson, 1888-1889.	27552	Upload another image See more images
Canongate Tolbooth	163 Canongate	14 December 1970	55°57′06″N 3°10′48″W	1591. Renovated by R H Morham, 1879 and 1884. Now used by The People's Story Museum	27582	Upload another image See more images
The Supreme Courts of Scotland	Parliament Square	14 December 1970	55°56′56″N 3°11′25″W	Robert Reid, 1803-1810 and 1827-1838 additions and alterations; further alteration, mainly internal, including William Burn, 1827-1829, William Nixon, 1844, William Thomas Oldrieve, 1906-1907 and later 20th century extensions.	27699	Upload another image See more images
Parliament Hall	Parliament Square	14 December 1970	55°56′56″N 3°11′27″W	Sir James Murray, 1631-1640 with later extensions to the north, Robert Reid, 1807-1810.	27704	Upload another image See more images
Signet Library	Parliament Square	14 December 1970	55°56′57″N 3°11′30″W	Robert Reid, 1810 (exterior) and William Stark, 1812-1813 (interior) with staircase by W H Playfair, 1819 and William Burn, 1834.	27709	Upload another image See more images
District Courts (Formerly Police Chambers)	1 and 1A Parliament Square	14 December 1970	55°56′58″N 3°11′23″W	William Nixon, 1845-1849.	27714	Upload Photo
National Museum of Scotland	44 Chambers Street	14 December 1970	55°56′49″N 3°11′22″W	Captain Francis Fowke (Royal Engineers), 1861-1871 and W Wing completed 1885-1889 by W W Robertson. Later alterations and additions, including neo-classical SE extension by WT Oldrieve, 1910-1914, further S extension of 1934-1937 (Office of Works), W block by Gordon Benson and Alan Forsyth, 1998 and internal remodelling Gareth Hoskins, 2011.	27748	Upload another image See more images
St Andrew's House	Regent Road	14 December 1970	55°57′13″N 3°11′02″W	Thomas Tait, 1934-1939.	27756	Upload another image See more images
St Cecilia's Hall	Cowgate	14 December 1970	55°56′56″N 3°11′11″W	Robert Mylne, 1763, with later extensions John Thin, 1812 and predominantly Ian Lindsay, 1960s.	27760	Upload another image See more images
Usher Hall	Cambridge Street	14 December 1970	55°56′51″N 3°12′18″W	James Stockdale Harrison and Howard Henry Thomson, 1910-1914.	27780	Upload another image See more images
Alexander and Bucephalus Statue	High Street, City Chambers Courtyard	14 December 1970	55°57′00″N 3°11′25″W	Sir John Steell, modelled 1832 (cast 1883).	27855	Upload another image See more images
Mercat Cross	High Street	14 December 1970	55°56′59″N 3°11′25″W	Sydney Mitchell, 1885. Replica of former 15th- and 17th-century structures.	27792	Upload another image See more images
Memorial to Walter Francis, 5th Duke of Buccleuch and 7th Duke of Queensberry	High Street	14 December 1970	55°56′58″N 3°11′30″W	Sir Joseph Boehm, 1887-1888.	27844	Upload another image See more images
Bowfoot Well	West Bow	21 April 1969	55°56′53″N 3°11′40″W	Built by Robert Mylne under supervision of Sir William Bruce, 1674, restored 1861.	27893	Upload another image See more images
Greyfriars Bobby Fountain	George IV Bridge	29 April 1977	55°56′49″N 3°11′29″W	William Brodie, 1873.	27899	Upload another image See more images
George IV Bridge		14 December 1970	55°56′54″N 3°11′31″W	Thomas Hamilton, 1829-1834.	27942	Upload another image See more images
Netherbow Wellhead	High Street	14 December 1970	55°57′02″N 3°11′07″W	Built by Robert Mylne under supervision of Sir William Bruce, circa 1675; subsequently moved and rebuilt.	27901	Upload another image See more images
Edinburgh College of Art	Lauriston Place	14 December 1970	55°56′45″N 3°11′59″W	J M Dick Peddie, 1906-1909.	27974	Upload another image See more images
King's Bridge	King's Stables Road	14 December 1970	55°56′51″N 3°12′06″W	Thomas Hamilton, 1829-1832.	27943	Upload another image See more images
Regent Bridge	Over Calton Road	19 April 1966	55°57′13″N 3°11′14″W	Archibald Elliot, with Robert Stevenson, 1815-1819.	27945	Upload another image See more images
George Heriot's School, Main Building	Lauriston Place	25 July 1966	55°56′45″N 3°11′41″W	William Wallace, William Ayton, John Mylne, Robert Mylne, 1628-1693. Gillespie Graham, 1837-1840 (refitting chapel), John Anderson, 1908 (alterations to interior).	27980	Upload another image See more images
Old College, University of Edinburgh	South Bridge	14 December 1970	55°56′51″N 3°11′12″W	Robert Adam, 1789; completion of quadrangle William Henry Playfair, 1818-1834; dome Sir Rowand Anderson, 1888; landscaping of courtyard, 2010.	27989	Upload another image See more images
Palace of Holyroodhouse	Holyroodhouse	14 December 1970	55°57′10″N 3°10′20″W	Sir William Bruce (Architect) and Robert Mylne (Master-Mason) for Charles II, 1671-1678. Later alterations by Robert Reid, William Nixon, Robert Matheson, John Fowler.	28022	Upload another image See more images
Fountain in Forecourt	Palace of Holyroodhouse	14 December 1970	55°57′09″N 3°10′23″W	Robert Matheson, 1859.	28024	Upload another image See more images
28 and 30 Croft-An-Righ (Croft and Righ House)	Holyroodhouse	14 December 1970	55°57′15″N 3°10′17″W	16th century, reconstructed later 17th century.	28029	Upload another image
Sundial, North Garden	Holyroodhouse	14 December 1970	55°57′13″N 3°10′23″W	John Mylne, 1633.	28030	Upload another image
Double Tree Hotel (Before 2014 this was the Point Hotel)	28-36 Bread Street	1 June 1979	55°56′44″N 3°12′13″W	John McLachlan, 1892; TP Marwick, 1898 and 1914; T Waller Marwick, 1937.	28347	Upload another image See more images
36-42 Candlemaker Row		14 December 1970	55°56′49″N 3°11′30″W	James Watson, 1722, remodelled Ebenezer J McRae, 1929. Including Candlemakers' Hall	28416	Upload another image
Russell House	3 Canongate	14 December 1970	55°57′10″N 3°10′30″W	Dating from around 1690. Alterations around 1895 by Simon and Tweedie. Restored in 1976 by Robert Hurd and Partners.	28426	Upload another image
Reid's Court, Canongate Manse	95 Canongate	14 December 1970	55°57′08″N 3°10′39″W	Early 18th century (restored Ian Gordon Lindsay and Partners 1958; further restoration 2002).	28429	Upload another image
Panmure House (Little Lochend Close)	115 Canongate	14 December 1970	55°57′08″N 3°10′42″W	1690 (renovated 1956 by J Wilson Paterson).	28431	Upload another image See more images
167 and 169 Canongate		14 December 1970	55°57′05″N 3°10′49″W	Early 17th century.	28433	Upload another image
Queensberry House	64 Canongate	14 December 1970	55°57′07″N 3°10′34″W	1667-70 with later additions and alterations by James Smith; extensively renovated and partly incorporated into the Scottish Parliament complex, 1999-2004.	28440	Upload another image See more images
Huntly House	142 and 146 Canongate	14 December 1970	55°57′05″N 3°10′46″W	Predominantly late 16th century with later alterations and additions. Occupied by the Museum of Edinburgh.	28445	Upload another image See more images
Acheson House	140 Canongate	14 October 1970	55°57′04″N 3°10′45″W	1633-1634. Restored 1936-1937 by Neil and Hurd.	28446	Upload another image See more images
Moray House	174 Canongate	14 December 1970	55°57′04″N 3°10′50″W	Circa 1625 with later additions.	28449	Upload another image See more images
3, 4, 5, 6 and 6B Chessel's Court (S Block) including St Saviour's Child Garden	Canongate	14 December 1970	55°57′01″N 3°10′59″W	Archibald Chesil. 1742-1748 with later alterations. Restored 1963-1964 by Robert Hurd and Partners.	28454	Upload another image
Outlook Tower	549 Castlehill	14 December 1970	55°57′00″N 3°11′38″W	17th century, with later alterations and additions, including David Rhind, 1853 and Robert Wilson.	28488	Upload another image See more images
Boswell's Court	352 Castlehill	14 December 1970	55°56′56″N 3°11′44″W	Early 17th century with later alterations, including Hardy and Wight, 1895.	28489	Upload another image
Cannonball House	356 Castlehill and 2 Castle Wynd North	14 December 1970	55°56′56″N 3°11′46″W	Early 17th century with later alterations and additions including John Carfrae, 1913.	28491	Upload another image
139 Cowgate, Former Tailor's Hall		14 December 1970	55°56′53″N 3°11′24″W	Dated 1621 with later additions and alterations.	28595	Upload another image
Library for Solicitors in the Supreme Courts of Scotland	94-114 Cowgate	12 December 1974	55°56′55″N 3°11′26″W	James Bow Dunn, 1888-1892.	28600	Upload another image See more images
98 Grassmarket		21 April 1969	55°56′53″N 3°11′41″W	Early 17th century with later alterations and additions.	28943	Upload another image
John Knox House	45 High Street	14 December 1970	55°57′02″N 3°11′06″W	Late 15th and 16th century, extended later 16th and 17th centuries.	29033	Upload another image See more images
Moubray House	51-55 High Street	14 December 1970	55°57′02″N 3°11′07″W	Circa 1630.	29034	Upload another image See more images
197-207 High Street including 1-14 Fleshmarket Close		14 December 1970	55°57′01″N 3°11′19″W	Early 18th century, incorporating earlier fabric.	29045	Upload another image
209-213 High Street including 1-6 Jackson's Close		14 December 1970	55°57′01″N 3°11′20″W	Early 18th century, incorporating earlier fabric.	29046	Upload another image
215-219 High Street		14 December 1970	55°57′01″N 3°11′20″W	18th century, incorporating earlier fabric.	29047	Upload another image
221-231 High Street		14 December 1970	55°57′00″N 3°11′21″W	Circa 1795.	29048	Upload Photo
233-243 High Street		14 December 1970	55°57′00″N 3°11′22″W	Circa 1795.	29049	Upload Photo
343-363 High Street and 2-8 Advocate's Close		14 December 1970	55°56′59″N 3°11′29″W	Circa 1735, incorporating earlier fabric and with later alterations, including McMenan and Brown, 1987.	29050	Upload another image
367-381 High Street		14 December 1970	55°56′59″N 3°11′30″W	17th century, remodelled early 19th century.	29052	Upload another image
Adam Bothwell's House	High Street, 3 Advocate's Close	14 December 1970	55°57′00″N 3°11′30″W	Circa 1630.	29053	Upload Photo
Lord Reid Building	High Street, New Assembly Close	14 December 1970	55°56′58″N 3°11′19″W	James Gillespie Graham, 1813-1814 incorporating earlier fabric.	29069	Upload another image
435 Lawnmarket, including Deacon Brodie's Tavern		14 December 1970	55°56′59″N 3°11′35″W	Early 18th century with alterations at ground and 1st floors to form public house, PL Henderson, 1894; alterations Robert Hurd, 1950.	29227	Upload another image
Lady Stair's House	Lady Stair's Close, Lawnmarket	14 December 1970	55°56′59″N 3°11′37″W	1622, restored and rebuilt, George Shaw Aitken, 1896-1897.	29231	Upload another image See more images
Gladstone's Land	481 and 483 Lawnmarket	14 December 1970	55°56′58″N 3°11′38″W	Frontage 1621, 16th-century rear wing and 18th-century addition to NW; further 19th century alterations and additions; restored Frank C Mears 1934-1936 and Robert Hurd and Partners, 1979-1980.	29233	Upload another image See more images
491-495 Lawnmarket		14 December 1970	55°56′58″N 3°11′38″W	Circa 1795, with earlier wing to rear, remodelled S Henbest Capper, 1892.	29234	Upload Photo
Milne's Court, including Edward Salveson Hall and Philip Henman Hall	513-521 Lawnmarket	14 December 1970	55°56′57″N 3°11′40″W	Robert Mylne, 1690, incorporating earlier fabric, with later alterations and additions; partially restored, J A Williamson, 1914; reconstructed Ian G Lindsay and Partners, 1966-1970.	29237	Upload another image See more images
302-310 Lawnmarket, including Buchanan's Close and Brodie's Close		14 December 1970	55°56′57″N 3°11′35″W	16th and 17th century with later alterations and additions, including James Jerdan 1896.	29239	Upload Photo
312-320 Lawnmarket, including Fisher's Close		14 December 1970	55°56′57″N 3°11′37″W	Circa 1700, major alterations James Shearer, 1950-1953.	29240	Upload Photo
322-328 Lawnmarket, including Riddles Court, Riddles Close and 5 and 6 Victoria Terrace		14 December 1970	55°56′56″N 3°11′37″W	Circa 1590 and 1726, with later alterations and additions, including George Smith, circa 1840, Stuart Henbest Capper, 1890 and 1893, George Shaw Aitken 1895 and John Wilson Paterson, 1958-1959 and 1964.	29242	Upload another image
89 West Bow		21 April 1969	55°56′54″N 3°11′41″W	Late 17th century.	29903	Upload another image
91 and 93 West Bow, including Crocket's Land		21 April 1969	55°56′54″N 3°11′41″W	Circa 1705, with later alterations.	29904	Upload another image
95-99 West Bow		21 April 1969	55°56′54″N 3°11′41″W	Dated 1729.	29905	Upload another image
101 and 103 West Bow		21 April 1969	55°56′53″N 3°11′41″W	Late 17th to early 18th century.	29906	Upload another image
Black Watch (South African War) Memorial	Bank Street (Corner Market Street)	12 December 1974	55°57′00″N 3°11′40″W	W Birnie Rhind, 1908-1910.	30034	Upload another image See more images
North Bridge		12 December 1974	55°57′06″N 3°11′17″W	Blyth and Westland (engineers), with architectural details by Robert Morham, 1894-1897.	30035	Upload another image See more images
Lauriston Place Fire Station	Lauriston Place	13 August 1987	55°56′44″N 3°11′59″W	Robert Morham, 1897-1901.	30123	Upload another image See more images
20-52 North Bridge, 175 and 177 High Street and 65-71 Cockburn Street		12 December 1974	55°57′03″N 3°11′18″W	James Dunn and James Finlay, 1899-1902. Including Scotsman Hotel, Scotsman Steps, Arcade, and Royal Mile Mansions	30143	Upload another image
26-28 Castle Terrace		14 December 1970	55°56′50″N 3°12′11″W	Sir James Gowans, 1868-1870 (dated 1870).	47853	Upload another image
29 Castle Terrace		14 December 1970	55°56′50″N 3°12′09″W	Sir James Gowans, 1868-1870.	47854	Upload Photo
30, 31 and 32 Castle Terrace		14 December 1970	55°56′49″N 3°12′09″W	Sir James Gowans, 1868-1870.	47855	Upload another image
33, 34 and 35 Castle Terrace		14 December 1970	55°56′49″N 3°12′10″W	Sir James Gowans, 1868-1870.	47856	Upload another image
36 Castle Terrace		14 December 1970	55°56′48″N 3°12′10″W	Sir James Gowans, 1868-1870.	47857	Upload another image
Victoria Terrace, with steps leading from Victoria Street to Upper Bow		29 March 2001	55°56′55″N 3°11′39″W	Thomas Hamilton, 1829-1834.	47901	Upload another image
South African War Memorial	North Bridge	12 December 1974	55°57′06″N 3°11′17″W	William Birnie Rhind, 1906.	49067	Upload another image See more images
1 and 2 Chessel's Court	Canongate	14 December 1970	55°57′03″N 3°10′59″W	Circa 1770 (restored 1963-1964 by Robert Hurd and Partners).	51171	Upload another image
Advocates' Library	Parliament Square, Old Town	14 December 1970	55°56′56″N 3°11′30″W	W H Playfair, 1830 with alterations, Robert Matheson, 1856.	51179	Upload another image See more images
Blackie House	North Bank Street and Wardrop's Court, Old Town	14 December 1970	55°57′00″N 3°11′36″W	Late 17th century; upper floors reconstructed S Henbest Capper 1894; shop front, 1898; further alterations, Robert Hurd, 1950.	51522	Upload another image
Royal Lyceum Theatre	Grindlay Street	12 December 1974	55°56′49″N 3°12′15″W	CJ Phipps, 1883.	30031	Upload another image See more images
1-3 Ramsay Garden		14 December 1970	55°56′58″N 3°11′47″W	Early 18th century, and Arthur George Sydney Mitchell and George Wilson, 1894.	29593	Upload another image See more images
4-10 Ramsay Garden		14 December 1970	55°56′58″N 3°11′47″W	1733-1734 (Ramsay Lodge) with alterations and additions, principally Arthur George Sydney Mitchell and George Wilson, 1893.	29594	Upload another image
11 and 12 Ramsay Garden		14 December 1970	55°56′57″N 3°11′49″W	Stewart Henbest Capper, 1893.	29595	Upload another image
Patrick Geddes Hall (Part)	1 Mound Place	14 December 1970	55°56′59″N 3°11′45″W	Late 18th century.	29379	Upload another image
Patrick Geddes Hall (Part)	2 Mound Place	14 December 1970	55°56′59″N 3°11′45″W	Late 18th century.	29380	Upload another image
11, 12 and 13 North Bank Street		14 December 1970	55°56′59″N 3°11′38″W	1723-1727, with later alterations and additions.	29236	Upload another image See more images
Dolphin House	3, 4 and 5 Hunter Square	14 December 1970	55°56′59″N 3°11′18″W	John Baxter, 1788-1790.	29123	Upload another image
Former Skinner's Hall	2-4 New Skinner's Close	14 December 1970	55°56′59″N 3°11′07″W	1643 with later additions.	28325	Upload another image
Bank of Scotland	11 Bank Street	14 December 1970	55°57′01″N 3°11′35″W	Richard Crichton and Robert Reid, 1801-1806, remodelled and enlarged by David Bryce 1863; alterations by Peddie and Kinnear, 1878.	28263	Upload another image See more images
17-20 Bank		14 December 1970	55°56′59″N 3°11′35″W	Late 17th century, with later alterations and additions, including Henry Kerr, 1895.	28264	Upload Photo
15 North Bank Street		14 December 1970	55°56′59″N 3°11′40″W	1723-1727, with alterations by Sydney Mitchell and Wilson, 1901.	28265	Upload another image See more images
16 North Bank Street		14 December 1970	55°56′59″N 3°11′40″W	David Cousin, 1859-1863, probably incorporating earlier fabric.	28266	Upload another image See more images
Abbey Sanctuary	Abbey Strand	14 December 1970	55°57′10″N 3°10′26″W	Early 16th century with 17th century and later additions and alterations.	28207	Upload another image
Thompson's Court	Abbey Strand	14 December 1970	55°57′10″N 3°10′27″W	Early 16th century origins with series of later additions and alterations.	28208	Upload another image
Sacred Heart Church (Roman Catholic)	28 Lauriston Street	14 December 1970	55°56′42″N 3°12′05″W	Father Richard Vaughan, 1860, with some later alterations.	27266	Upload another image See more images
Charles II Statue	Parliament Square	14 December 1970	55°56′57″N 3°11′26″W	Statue 1685; pedestal 1835, incorporating 1685 inscription tablet.	27851	Upload another image See more images
Calton Old Burial Ground and Monuments	Regent Road	19 April 1966	55°57′15″N 3°11′10″W	Established 1718.	27920	Upload another image See more images
11-15 Cornwall Street		14 December 1970	55°56′50″N 3°12′12″W	Sir James Gowans, 1868-1870.	47858	Upload another image
13-16 Ramsay Garden		14 December 1970	55°56′57″N 3°11′48″W	Stewart Henbest Capper, 1892.	48247	Upload another image See more images
1-6 India Buildings	Victoria Street	14 December 1970	55°56′55″N 3°11′35″W	David Cousin, 1864-1866.	29868	Upload another image
Burns Monument	Regent Road	19 April 1966	55°57′12″N 3°10′42″W	Thomas Hamilton, 1830.	27801	Upload another image See more images
25 Castle Terrace and 17 Cornwall Street		14 December 1970	55°56′50″N 3°12′12″W	Sir James Gowans, 1868-1870 (dated 1868).	28485	Upload another image

== Bibliography ==
- Old Town Conservation Area Character Appraisal, Edinburgh City Council, n.d. (PDF)
- Richard Fawcett, Scottish Architecture: From the Accession of the Stewarts to the Reformation, 1371-1560, Edinburgh University Press, 1994
- Richard Fawcett, Scottish Medieval Churches: Architecture & Furnishings, The History Press, 2002
- Miles Glendinning, The Architecture of Scottish Government: From Kingship to Parliamentary Democracy, Dundee University Press, 2004
- George Hay, The Architecture of Scottish Post-Reformation Churches. 1560-1843, Clarendon, 1957
- Louisa Humm, John Lowrey, The Architecture of Scotland, 1660-1750, Edinburgh University Press, 2020
- Tolbooths and Townhouses: Civic Architecture In Scotland To 1833, RCAHMS, 1987
- Jim Johnson, Lou Rosenburg, Renewing Old Edinburgh, Argyll Publishing, 2010
- Ray McKenzie, Public Sculpture of Edinburgh (Volume 1): The Old Town and South Edinburgh, Liverpool University Press, 2018
