= John Dalrymple, 1st Earl of Stair =

Scottish politician and lawyer (1648–1707)

The Right Honourable The Earl of Stair PC
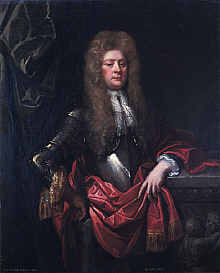
- Portrait of Stair by John Baptist Medina

Joint Secretary of State in Scotland with (1) Earl of Melville and (2) James Johnston
- In office 10 January 1691 – July 1695
- Monarchs: Mary II & William II & III
- Preceded by: Earl of Melville
- Succeeded by: James Johnston

Lord Advocate
- In office 1689–1692
- Monarchs: Mary II & William II & III
- Preceded by: George Mackenzie
- Succeeded by: Sir James Stewart

MP for Stranraer, Parliament of Scotland
- In office March 1689 – June 1702
- Monarchs: Mary II & William II & III; Queen Anne

Lord Justice Clerk
- In office 1688–1690
- Monarchs: King James VII & II; Mary II & William II & III
- Preceded by: James Foulis, Lord Colinton
- Succeeded by: Sir George Campbell

Lord Advocate
- In office 1687–1688
- Monarch: King James VII & II
- Preceded by: George Mackenzie
- Succeeded by: George Mackenzie

Personal details
- Born: 10 November 1648 Stair House, Kyle, Ayrshire; Scotland
- Died: 8 January 1707 (aged 58) Edinburgh
- Resting place: Kirkliston, Linlithgowshire
- Spouse: Elizabeth Dundas (c.1654–1731)
- Children: John Dalrymple, 2nd Earl of Stair (1673-1747); William (1678-1744); George (1680-1745); Lady Margaret Dalrymple (1684-1779); Six others died young
- Parent(s): James Dalrymple, Viscount Stair; Margaret Kennedy nee Ross

John Dalrymple, 1st Earl of Stair PC (10 November 1648 – 8 January 1707) was a Scottish politician and lawyer. As Joint Secretary of State in Scotland 1691–1695, he played a key role in suppressing the Jacobite rising of 1689 and was forced to resign in 1695 for his part in the Massacre of Glencoe. Restored to favour under Queen Anne in 1702 and made Earl of Stair in 1703, he was closely involved in negotiations over the 1707 Acts of Union that created the Kingdom of Great Britain but died on 8 January 1707, several months before the Act became law.

== Life ==
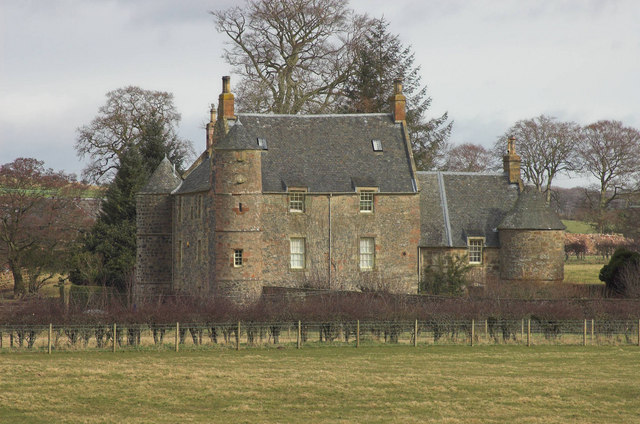
Stair House, birthplace of John Dalrymple

John Dalrymple was born in 1648, at Stair House near Kyle, Ayrshire, eldest son of James Dalrymple, Viscount Stair and Margaret Ross-Kennedy. His father James was a prominent lawyer and one of the few Scots involved in the 1650 Treaty of Breda who retained the favour of Charles II after the 1660 Restoration.

In January 1669, John married Elizabeth Dundas (died 25 May 1731), daughter of Sir John Dundas of Newliston and Agnes Gray; they had ten children in all, four of whom reached adulthood: John Dalrymple, 2nd Earl of Stair (1673–1747), Lady Margaret Dalrymple (died 1777), who in 1700 married Hugh Campbell, 3rd Earl of Loudoun, William (1678–1744), and George (1680–1745).

== Career ==
James Dalrymple was author of the Institutions of the Law of Scotland, first published in 1681 but in circulation since the 1660s and generally accepted as 'the foundation of modern Scots law.' With this background, John followed his father into a legal career, as did three of his four brothers and qualified as an Advocate in February 1672.

During the 1639-1651 Wars of the Three Kingdoms, Scottish Royalists and Covenanters both agreed monarchy itself was divinely ordered but disagreed on the nature and extent of Royal authority versus that of the church. Determined to avoid a repeat of the collapse of political authority that had accompanied Covenanter rule, the Royalist view that the Crown was the supreme arbitrator and source of authority became dominant. This meant opposition to the King's authority, legal or otherwise, now became a political act.

In 1681, the future James VII & II was sent to Edinburgh as Lord High Commissioner and in August, the Scottish Parliament passed the Succession Act. This confirmed the divine right of kings, the rights of the natural heir 'regardless of religion,' the duty of all to swear allegiance to the King and the independence of the Scottish Crown.

The Scottish Test Act passed at the same time required all public officials and MPs to swear 'to uphold the true Protestant religion' but also to acknowledge the supremacy of Royal authority in all religious matters. A number of prominent Scots Presbyterians including James Dalrymple and the Earl of Argyll refused to take the Test Act, since it exempted members of the Royal Family from making the same commitment and obliged everyone else to accept the King's authority, which caused an obvious problem with the Catholic James. Argyll was put on trial for treason with John Dalrymple as one of his lawyers; he was found guilty and sentenced to death but escaped to the Netherlands.

In January 1682, James Dalrymple also went into exile in Holland; John Graham or Claverhouse who was the military commander in charge of suppressing Presbyterian conventicles in South-West Scotland, quartered his troops on John Dalrymple's property and imposed fines on his tenants. His objections led to Dalrymple's arrest and imprisonment in September 1684; he was not released until November 1685 after James had become King.

== Legacy ==
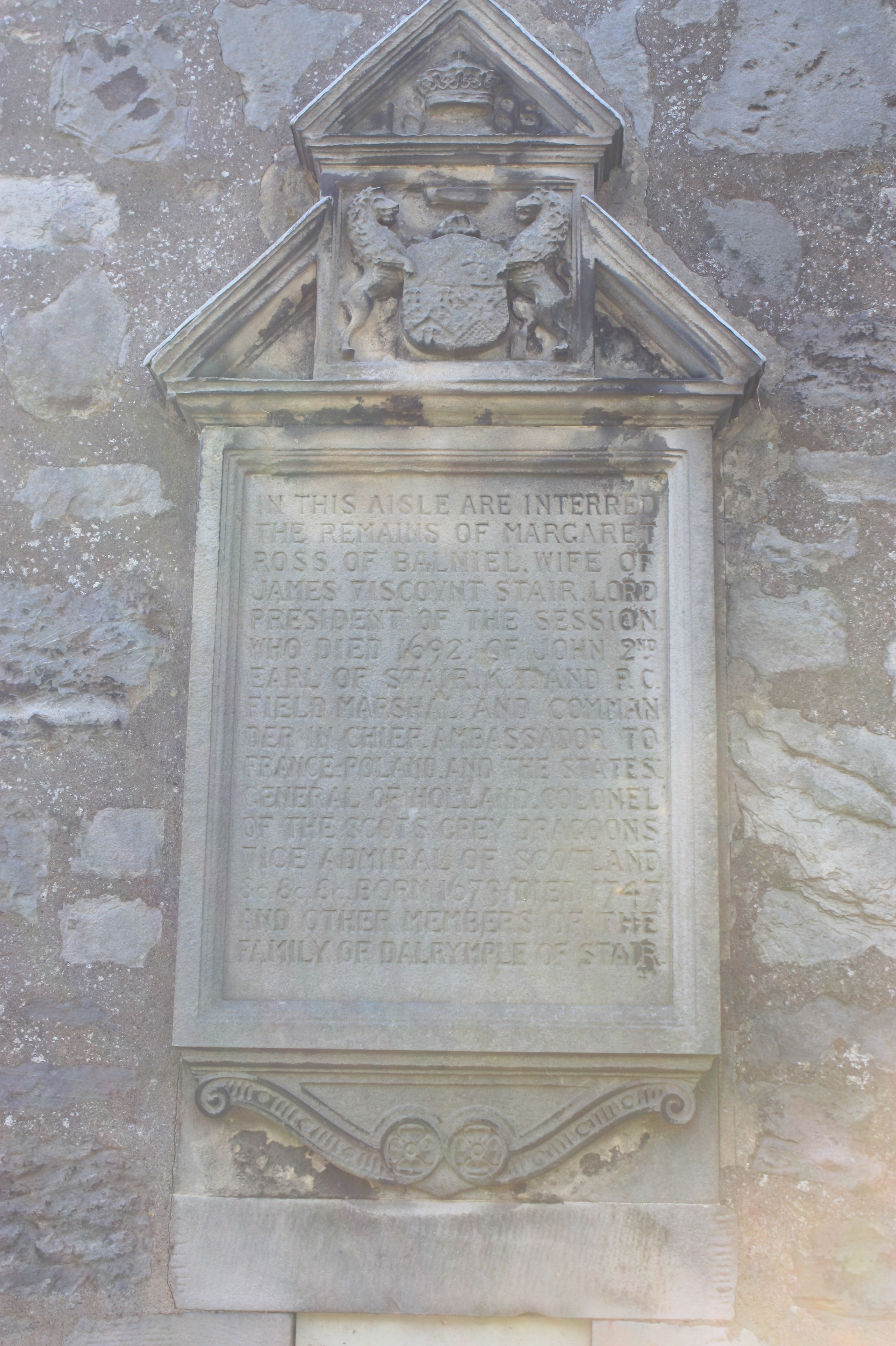
Memorial in Kirkliston Church

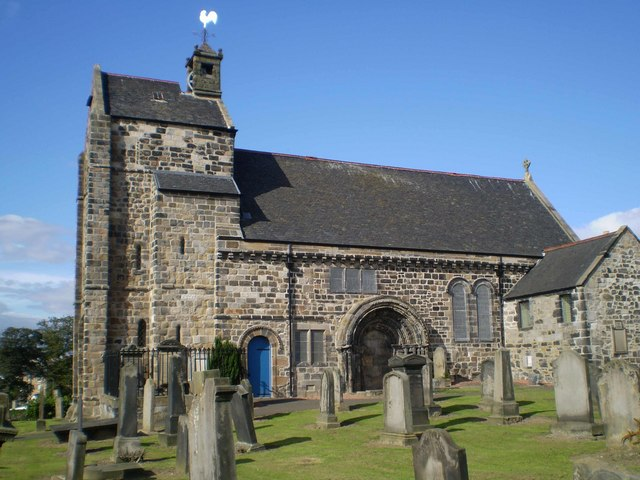
Kirkliston Parish Church, where Stair is buried

Stair's last political action was in the debate over Article XXII of the Act of Union, concerning Scottish representation in the unified Parliament; it was approved on 7 January 1707 and he died in his lodgings the following day, his death being attributed to apoplexy. He was buried just outside Edinburgh, at Kirkliston, Linlithgowshire.

After his death, his wife Elizabeth, Countess Dowager of Stair, acquired the house in Lady Gray's Close, Edinburgh, built and owned by her grandparents and known as Lady Gray's House. They were renamed Lady Stair's Close and House respectively and now house the Scottish Writer's Museum.

== Sources ==
- "Dalrymple, John, first earl of Stair (1648–1707)". Oxford Dictionary of National Biography (online ed.). Oxford University Press. doi:10.1093/ref:odnb/7052.
- https://web.archive.org/web/20160304073250/http://www.scotlandsplaces.gov.uk/search_item/index.php?service=RCAHMS&id=111898
- http://www.capitalcollections.org.uk/index.php?a=ViewItem&i=12542
- "Dalrymple, John (1648-1707)" . Dictionary of National Biography. London: Smith, Elder & Co. 1885–1900.

Legal offices
Preceded by George Mackenzie	Lord Advocate; 1687 – 1688	Succeeded by George Mackenzie
Preceded by Lord Colinton	Lord Justice Clerk; 1688 – 1690	Succeeded by Lord Cessnock
Preceded by George Mackenzie	Lord Advocate; 1689 – 1692	Succeeded by Sir James Stewart
Political offices
Preceded by Earl of Melville	Secretary of State, Scotland; 1691 – 1695	Succeeded by James Johnston
Parliament of Scotland
Preceded by Patrick Paterson	Burgh Commissioner for Stranraer; 1689	Succeeded by Sir Patrick Murray
Peerage of Scotland
New creation	Earl of Stair; 1703 – 1707	Succeeded by John Dalrymple
Preceded by James Dalrymple	Viscount of Stair; 1695 – 1707	Succeeded by John Dalrymple
