= Robert Garioch =

Scottish poet

Robert Garioch Sutherland (9 May 1909 – 26 April 1981) was a Scottish poet and translator. His poetry was written almost exclusively in the Scots language, he was a key member in the literary and language revival in the mid-20th century. However, his biggest influences were the 18th-century poet Robert Fergusson and the Italian Romanesco dialect sonneteer Giuseppe Gioachino Belli.

== Life ==
Garioch was born in Edinburgh, the son of a decorator and a music teacher, and attended the Royal High School before going to the University of Edinburgh. He was conscripted into the Royal Corps of Signals in 1941, and married early the following year. However, whilst serving in Operation Torch in North Africa, Garioch was captured by German troops in November 1942 and spent the following three years as a Prisoner of War.

After Garioch returned to the United Kingdom in 1945 he became a teacher, a job he held until taking early retirement in 1964. Following his retirement he worked on a number of Scottish literary magazines, most notably Scottish International. He also spent a number of years in the 1970s as writer-in-residence at the University of Edinburgh.

== Works ==
Experience as a POW had a significant impact on Garioch's career, and he provides a vivid account of those years in his autobiographical Two Men and a Blanket (1975). While interned in Italy, he learnt the language sufficiently well to read also authors who wrote in a variety of native dialects.

Unlike many of his contemporaries, Garioch wrote very little poetry concerning his war experiences. Instead he focussed primarily on social causes and the plight of the 'wee man', a fact that may account for his enduring popularity (particularly on the readings circuit). These facts, however, have distracted many critics from his extraordinary technical skill and the responsible scholarship of his handling of the Scots language, in which he surpasses all his contemporaries and even his great predecessor Hugh MacDiarmid (of whom he became critical). And there are weightier poems, such as 'The Wire', 'The Muir' or 'The Big Music', which entirely contradict the cosy persona which he sometimes adopted, and which is more often projected onto him. Aside from his original compositions, Garioch also translated a number of works by other poets into Scots. He translated a large number of poems from Roman dialect by Giuseppe Gioachino Belli, who was a massive influence on his own poetry, as well as two plays by George Buchanan (which were originally written in Latin). He also rendered Pindar and Hesiod into Scots.

Robert Garioch is commemorated in Makars' Court, outside The Writers' Museum, Lawnmarket, Edinburgh. Selections for Makars' Court are made by The Writers' Museum; The Saltire Society; The Scottish Poetry Library.

- Garioch, Robert and MacLean, Sorley (1940), Seventeen Poems for Sixpence, The Chalmers Press.
- Garioch, Robert (1949), Chuckies on the Cairn, The Chalmers Press.
- Garioch, Robert (1966), Selected Poems, Macdonald Publishers, Loanhead.
- Garioch, Robert (1973), Doktor Faust in Rose Street, Macdonald Publishers, Loanhead, ISBN 9780950210674
- Garioch, Robert, "Alastair Mackie's Poetry, in Annand, J.K. (ed.), 'Lallans Number 1: Mairtinmas 1973, The Lallans Society, pp. 10 - 12
- Garioch, Robert (1975), Two Men and a Blanket: Memoirs of Captivity, Southside, London, ISBN 0-900025-19-0.
- Garioch, Robert (1975), review of Bennygoak and Other Poems by Flora Garry, in Calgacus 2, Summer 1975, p. 54, ISSN 0307-2029
- Garioch, Robert (1983), Complete Poetical Works, Macdonald Publishers, Loanhead, ISBN 0-904265-93-5.
