= Royal Lyceum Theatre =

Theatre in Edinburgh, Scotland

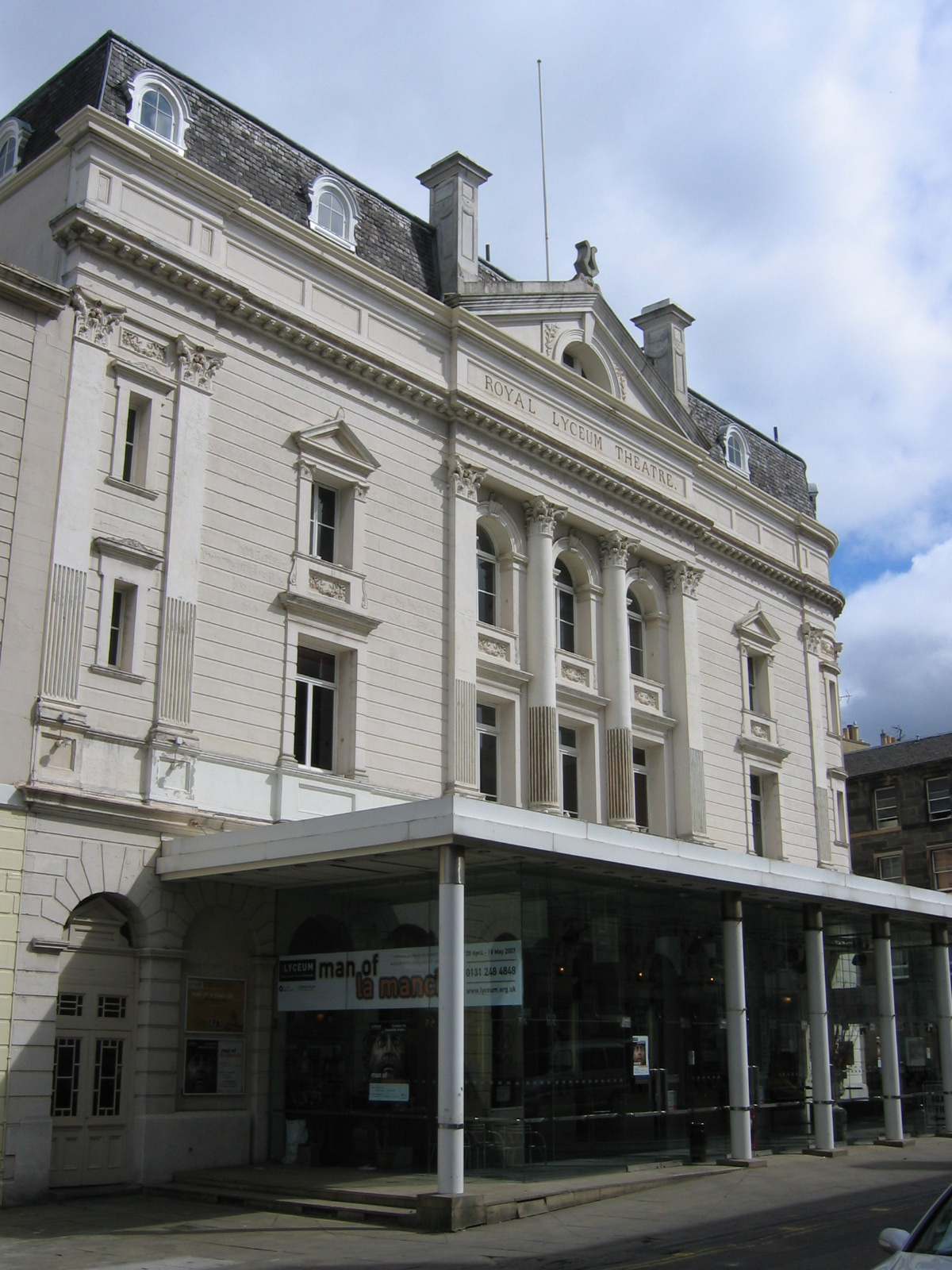
- Interactive map of Royal Lyceum Theatre
- Address: 30B Grindlay Street; Edinburgh; EH3 9AX
- Location: Edinburgh, Scotland, UK
- Coordinates: 55°56′49″N 03°12′16″W
- Owner: City of Edinburgh Council
- Capacity: 658
- Designation: Category A Listed building

Construction
- Opened: 10 September 1883
- Architect: C. J. Phipps

Tenant
- Royal Lyceum Theatre Company

Website
- www.lyceum.org.uk

The Royal Lyceum Theatre is a theatre in Edinburgh, Scotland, named after the Theatre Royal Lyceum and English Opera House, the residence at the time of legendary Shakespearean actor Henry Irving. It was built in 1883 by architect C. J. Phipps at a cost of £17,000 on behalf of James B. Howard and Fred. W. P. Wyndham, two theatrical managers and performers whose partnership became the renowned Howard & Wyndham Ltd created in 1895 by Michael Simons of Glasgow.

With only four minor refurbishments, in 1929, 1977, 1991 and 1996, the Royal Lyceum remains one of the most original and unaltered of the architect's works.

Opening night was 10 September 1883 with a performance of Much Ado About Nothing by the company of the London Lyceum Theatre, and starring Henry Irving and Ellen Terry.

In 1960, the building was bought by the Meyer Oppenheim property group, which intended to redevelop it along with adjacent buildings. The Edinburgh Civic Theatre Trust was established as part of a rescue mission and, on the eve of the theatre's closure in February 1964, Edinburgh Corporation purchased the building from Meyer Oppenheim to house the newly formed Royal Lyceum Theatre Company, who are now the permanent residents, leasing it from the City of Edinburgh Council.

The Royal Lyceum has been one of the principal venues for the Edinburgh International Festival since the festival's inception in 1947, its owners renting out the building for three weeks every August for visiting companies, and often for a further week to Fringe companies.

The Royal Lyceum has primarily been known for its provision of drama. It has also presented some significant opera, from the first tours of Carl Rosa in the latter part of the 19th century, through to the early decades of Scottish Opera in the 1960s and 1970s. Some important operas received their first Scottish performance at the Lyceum, including Madam Butterfly, Manon and Die Meistersinger.

The theatre was the first in Britain to be fitted with an iron safety curtain, and the first in Scotland to use electricity for house lighting. The auditorium was refurbished in the mid-1990s, with new floors, carpets and seats, an improved ventilation system, and new toilets.

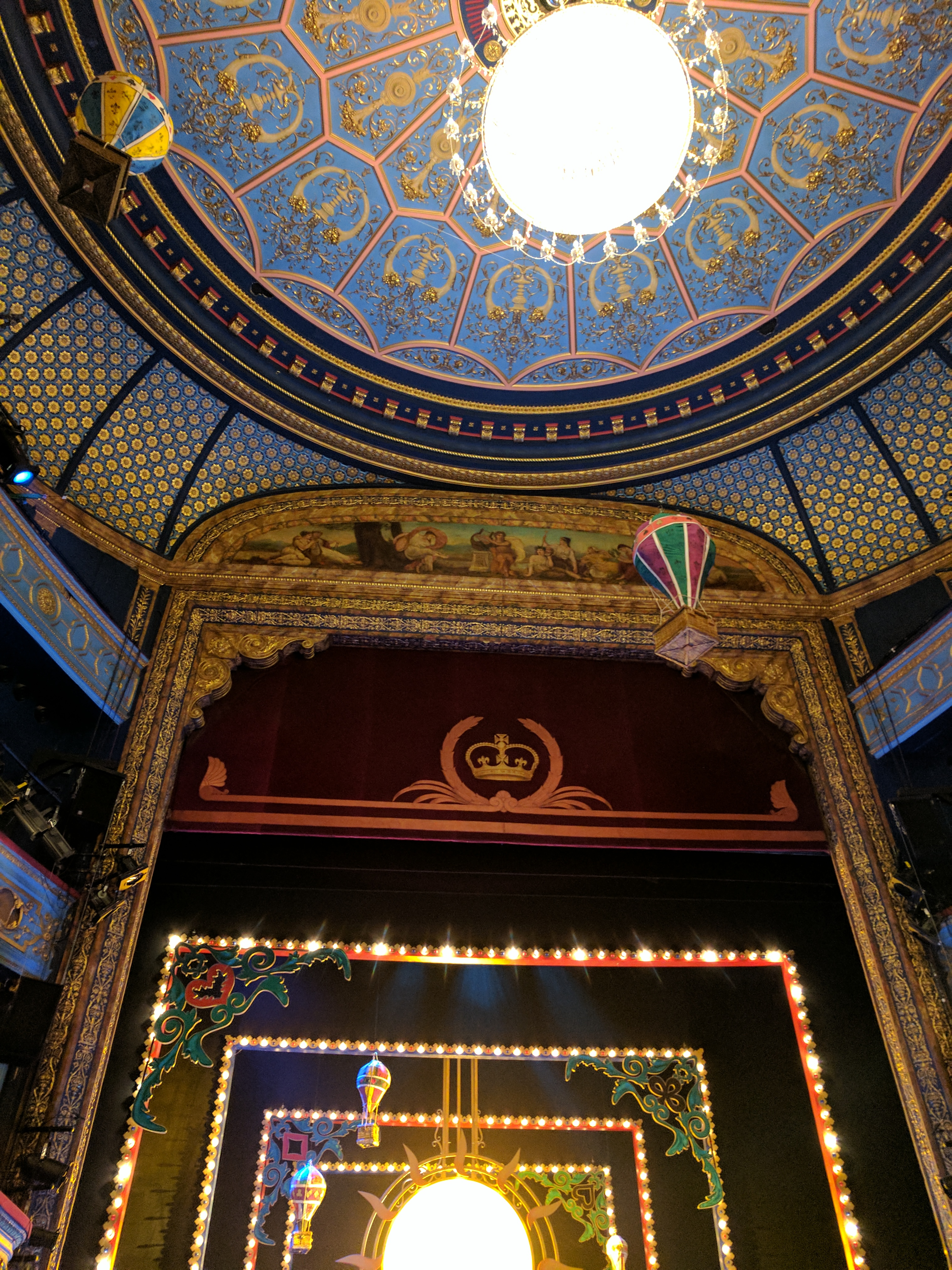
Interior of the Royal Lyceum Theatre, set up for a Pantomime

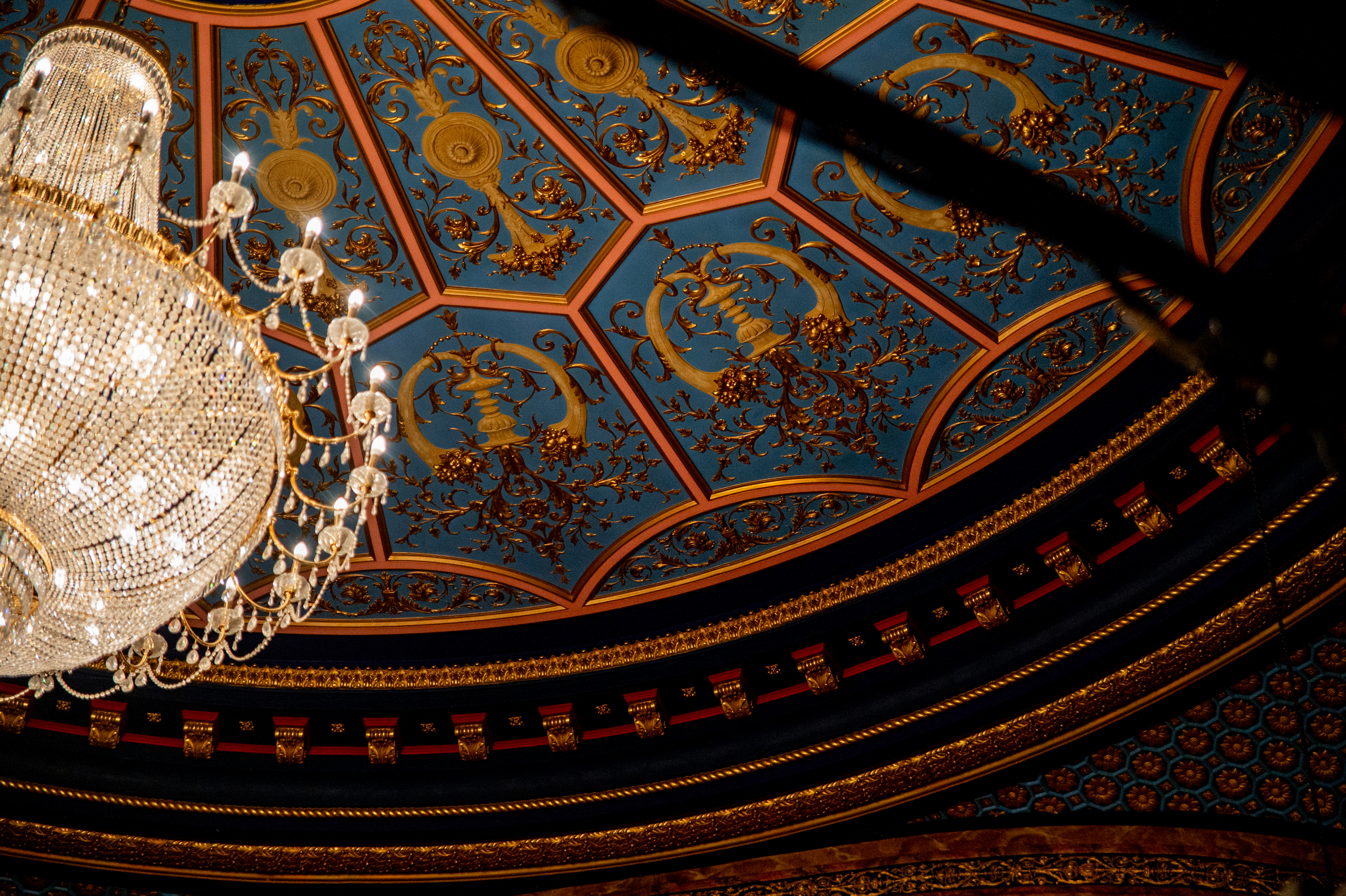
Decorative gilded plasterwork to circular roof with coffered ceiling

== Artistic Directors ==
The Edinburgh Civic Theatre Trust appointed Tom Fleming as the Lyceum Theatre's artistic director in 1965, and he staged a season of four plays between October and December. He resigned in 1966 in protest at the board's establishment of a subcommittee to control programming. He was succeeded by Clive Perry.

Bill Bryden was artistic director at the theatre between 1972 and 1975.

Kenny Ireland was artistic director between 1993 and 2003. Mark Thomson held the post until 2015. David Greig took on the role in 2016. James Brining became artistic director in 2025.

== Notable productions ==
A lavish production of The Lady of the Lake, Edmund John Eyre's dramatic adaptation of Walter Scott's narrative poem of 1810, was produced at the theatre in 1887, with spectacular scenery depicting scenes in the Trossachs, with James Howard playing Roderick Dhu and Fred Wyndham in the role of Marmaduke.

James Bridie's The Anatomist was premiered by the Masque Theatre at the Lyceum in 1931.

Rob Roy MacGregor; or, Auld Lang Syne, Isaac Pocock's adaptation of Walter Scott's novel Rob Roy (1817), was staged at the theatre during the visit of King Olaf of Norway to Scotland in 1962.

Stewart Conn's The Burning, a drama based on James VI's obsession with witchcraft and rivalry with Francis Stewart, 5th Earl of Bothwell, was staged at the theatre in 1971.

Jack Ronder's adaptation of James Hogg's Confessions of a Justified Sinner, directed by Richard Eyre, was staged by the Lyceum Theatre Company as part of the Edinburgh International Festival in August 1971.

Bill Bryden's Willie Rough, set in Greenock between February 1914 and June 1916, was staged by the company in February 1972, with James Grant in the title role and Fulton Mackay playing Hughie.

Keith Dewhurst's dramatic adaptation of Robert Louis Stevenson's Kidnapped, directed by Bill Bryden and with music by the English folk-rock band Steeleye Span, was staged by the company in August 1972.

The Hypochondriak, Hector MacMillan's translation into Scots of Molière's La Malade Imaginaire (1673), was staged by the Lyceum Theatre Company in January 1987 under the direction of John Matthews and Gerry Mulgrew.

Communicado Theatre Company's production of Edwin Morgan's Scots translation of Edmond Rostand's Cyrano de Bergerac, directed by Gerry Mulgrew and Andy Farrell and with Tom Mannion in the title role, was staged at the theatre in October and November 1996.

Muriel Romanes directed the company in Jay Presson Allen's dramatisation of Muriel Spark's novel, The Prime of Miss Jean Brodie, with Siobhan Redmond in the title role, in 2003.

Sue Glover's Bondagers, about the lives of female landworkers in the Scottish Borders, was produced at the Lyceum in October and November 2014 under the direction of Lu Kemp.

Laurie Sansom's adaptation of Muriel Spark's novella, The Drivers Seat, with Morven Christie in the role of Lise, was staged at the Lyceum by the National Theatre of Scotland in June 2015.

Tony Cownie's adaptation of Hanna Cowley's The Belle's Stratagem was produced by the company in February 2018.

Matthew Lutton directed Malthouse Theatre's production of David Greig's adaptation of Stanislaw Lem's novel Solaris at the Lyceum in June and July 2019.

Gabriel Quigley's adaptation of Muriel Spark's novella The Girls of Slender Means, directed by Roxana Silbert, was staged by the company in April and May 2024.

== Ghosts ==
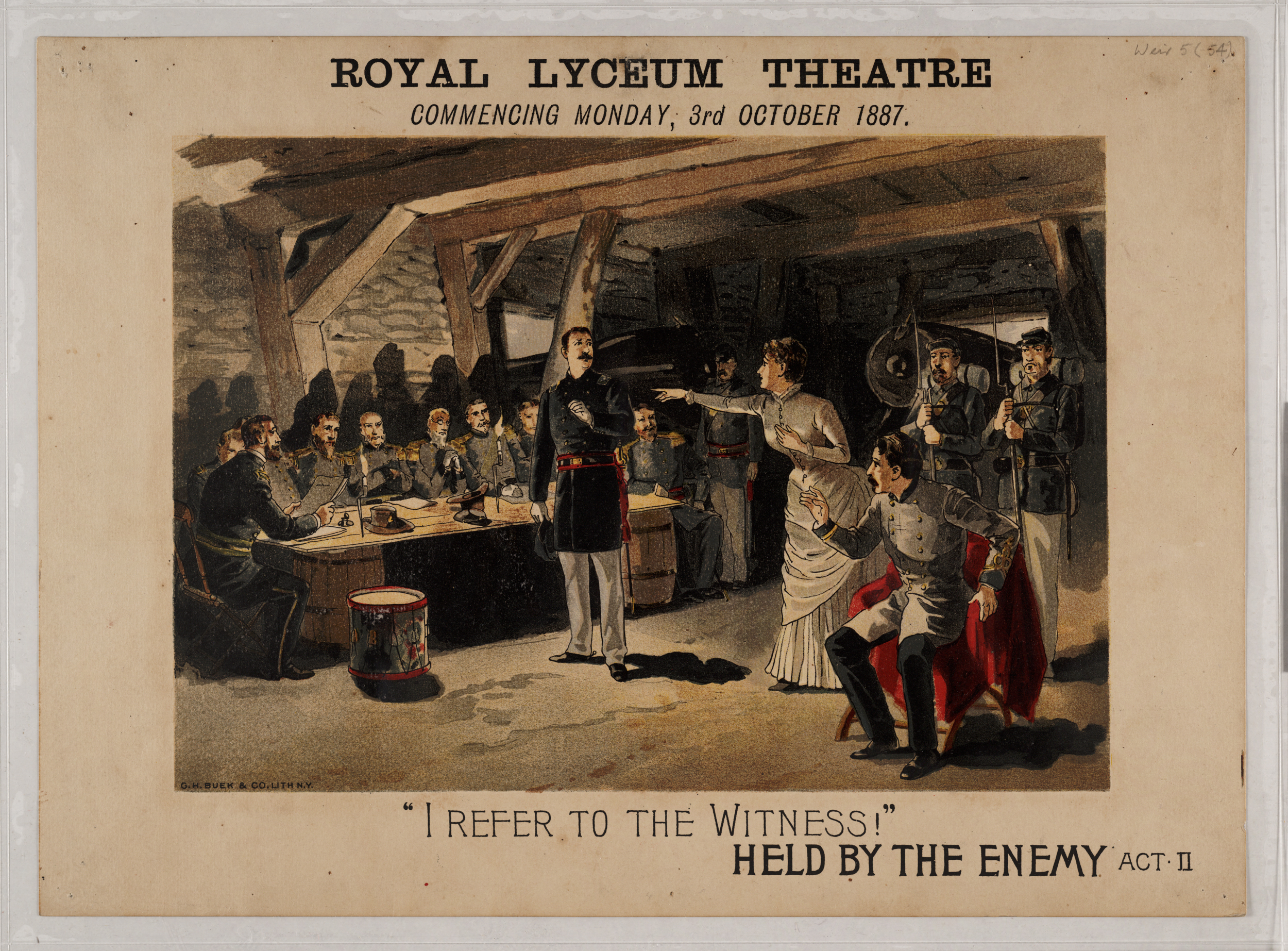
Poster for a performance of William Gillette's Held by the enemy at the theatre in 1887

The theatre is believed to be haunted, and there have been sightings of a blue lady who is believed to be Ellen Terry, the actress who performed at the Lyceum's first show. In addition, a shadowy figure has been reportedly seen high above the stage in the lighting rig. Many sightings have been reported to have been accompanied by a ringing noise.

== See also ==
- List of Category A listed buildings in the Old Town, Edinburgh
- List of theatres in Scotland
- Adjoining buildings
  - Traverse Theatre
  - Usher Hall
