= Makars' Court =

Courtyard in Edinburgh, Scotland

Coordinates: 55.94968°N 3.19345°W

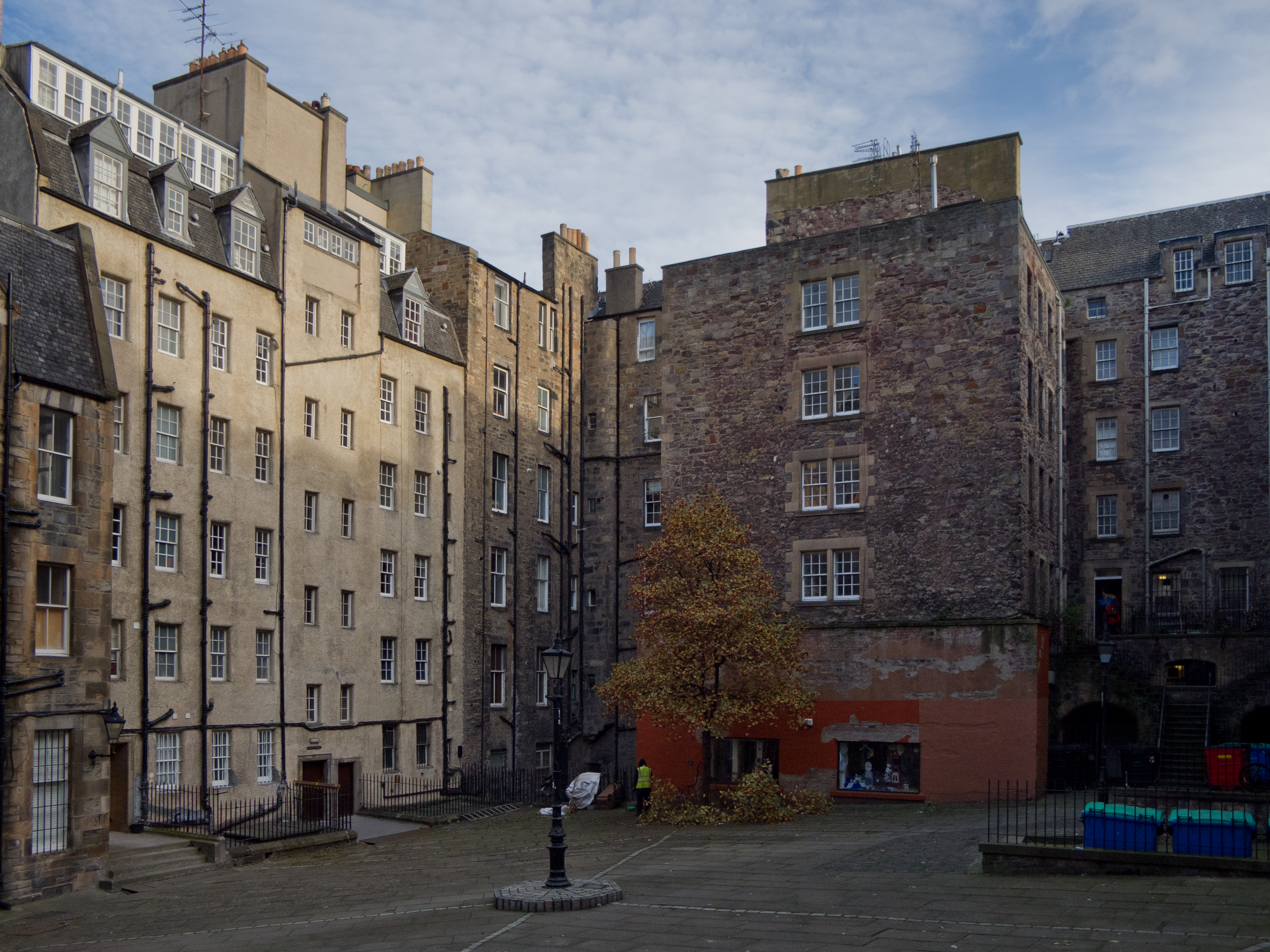
Makars' Court

Makars' Court is a courtyard in central Edinburgh, Scotland. It forms part of Lady Stair's Close, which connects the Lawnmarket with The Mound to the north, and is next to the Writers' Museum. Described as an "evolving national literary monument", the courtyard incorporates quotations from Scottish literature inscribed onto paving slabs. The quotations represent works in the languages used by Scots past and present: Gaelic, Scots, English, and Latin.

== Selection ==
The Scots language term makar denotes an author or writer, though stressing their role as a "skilled and versatile worker in the craft of writing". Since 2002 the city of Edinburgh has appointed its own official Makar.

In 1997, twelve Scottish writers were selected by the Saltire Society, and quotations from their works were inscribed on stone slabs installed in the area adjacent to the museum. The first was unveiled by Ronald Harwood, then president of International PEN, and the rest by poet Iain Crichton Smith. Further inscriptions continue to be added to the Court.

== List of makars commemorated ==
Makar	Image	Language	Quotation	Work quoted	Date of work
J. K. Annand		Scots	"Sing it aince for pleisure / Sing it twice for joy"		1970
John Barbour		Scots	"Fredome is a noble thing"	The Brus	1375
James Boswell		English	"I rattled down the High Street in high elevation of spirits"	London Journal	1762
James Bridie		English	"Who knows the heart of a man and what moves in that darkness?"	Susannah and the Elders	1937
George Mackay Brown		English	"In the fire of images / Gladly I put my hand"	"Hamnavoe"	1959
John Buchan		English	"We can only repay our debt to the past by putting the future in debt to us"	An Address to the people of Canada on the Coronation of George VI	1937
George Buchanan		Latin	"Populo enim jus est ut imperium cui velit deferat" (For it is right that the people confer power on whom they please)	De Iure Regni apud Scottos	1579
Robert Burns		Scots	"Man to man the world o'er / Shall brithers be for a that"	"Is There for Honest Poverty"	1795
Helen Cruickshank		English	"the spirit endures for ever"	"Spring in the Mearns"	1935
David Daiches		English	"Bridge-building is my vocation"	Natural Light: Portraits of Scottish Writers	1985
Gavin Douglas		Scots	"mak it braid and plane / Kepand na sudron bot our awyn langage"	Eneados	1513
William Dunbar		Scots	"The flesche is brukle, the Feynd is sle / Timor Mortis conturbat me"	Lament for the Makars	1505
Dorothy Dunnett		English	"Where are the links of the chain... joining us to the past?"	Checkmate	1975
Robert Fergusson		Scots	"Auld Reikie, wale o ilka town"	"Auld Reikie"	c. 1770
James Allan Ford		English	"Sing out the silence, fill for ever and ever the emptiness"	A Statue for a Public Place	1965
John Galt		Scots	"birr and smeddum" (vigour and liveliness)	Annals of the Parish	1821
Robert Garioch		Scots	"in simmer, whan aa sorts foregether / in Embro to the ploy"	"Embro to the Ploy"	1977
Neil M. Gunn		English	"Knowledge is high in the head... but the salmon of wisdom swims deep"	The Green Isle of the Great Deep	1944
Robert Henryson		Scots	"Blissed be sempill lyfe withoutin dreid"	The Moral Fabillis	1480s
Violet Jacob		Scots	"There's muckle lyin yont the Tay that's mair to me nor life"	Flemington	1911
George Campbell Hay		Scots/ Gaelic	"The hert's the compass tae the place that ye wad gae whan land ye lea. Cha chuir ceann is cridh' air iomrall thu Bi iomlan is bi beò" (Head and heart will not lead you astray, be complete and alive.)	Collected Poems and Songs of George Campbell Hay (Deorsa Mac Iain Dheorsa)	2000
William Sydney Graham		Scots	"What is the language using us for?"	Implements in Their Places	1977
George Bruce		English	"The see trembles- voiceless / It is the rare moment / when a word is sought"	Pursuit. Poems	1986-1998
John Muir		English	"I care to live only to entice people to look at Nature's loveliness"	Wilderness Essays	1874
David Lyndsay		Scots	"Lat us haif the bukis necessare / To commoun weill"	Ane Dialog betuix Experience and Ane Courteour	1554
Fionn MacColla		English	"my roots in the soil of Alba"	The Albannach	1932
Hugh MacDiarmid		Scots	"Drums in the Walligate, pipes in the air / The wallopin' thistle is ill to bear"	A Drunk Man Looks at the Thistle	1926
Duncan Ban MacIntyre		Gaelic	"'S e mùthadh air an t-saoghal / An coire laghach gaolach / A dhol a-nis air faondradh" (A decaying has come upon the world / That the fine beloved corrie / Should now be desolate)	"Cumha Coire Cheathaich"	c. 1768
Somhairle MacGill-Eain		Gaelic	"nan robh againn Alba shaor / Alba co-shinte ri ar gaol" (If we had Scotland free / Scotland equal to our love)	"Am Boilseabhach"	1974
Robert McLellan		Scots	"The pouer to bigg a braw warld in his brain / Marks man the only craitur that can greit"	The Carlin Moth	1947
Lachlan Mor MacMhuirich		Gaelic	"A Chlanna Cuinn cuimhnichibh / Cruas an àm na h-iorghaile" (O Children of Conn, remember / Hardihood in time of battle)	Harlaw Brosnachadh	1411
Elizabeth Melville, Lady Culross		Scots	"Though tyrants threat, though Lyons rage and rore Defy them all, and feare not to win out"	Ane Godlie Dreame	1603
Màiri Mhòr nan Òran		Gaelic	"Cuimhnichibh gur sluagh sibh / Is cumaibh suas ur còir" (Remember that you are a people / And stand up for your rights)	"Eilean a' Cheò"	c. 1880
Naomi Mitchison		English	"Go back far enough and all humankind are cousins"	Early in Orcadia	1987
Neil Munro		English	"And yet, and yet, this New Road will some day be the Old Road, too"	The New Road	1914
Tom Scott		Scots	"Weird hou men maun aye be makin war / Insteid o things they need"	Brand the Builder	1975
Sir Walter Scott		English	"This is my own, my native land!"	"The Lay of the Last Minstrel"	1805
Nan Shepherd		English	"Its a grand thing to get leave to live"	The Quarry Wood	1928
Sydney Goodsir Smith		Scots	"Bards hae sung o lesser luves than I o thee / Oh my great follie and my granderie"	Under the Eildon Tree	1948
Iain Crichton Smith		Gaelic and English	"Let our three-voiced country sing in a new world"	"The Beginning of a New Song"	1999
Muriel Spark		English	"The Transfiguration of the Commonplace"	The Prime of Miss Jean Brodie	1961
Robert Louis Stevenson		English	"There are no stars so lovely as Edinburgh street lamps"	The Silverado Squatters	1883
Nigel Tranter		English	"You intend to bide here? To be sure. Can you think of anywhere better?"	Columba	1987
Douglas Young		Scots	"He was eident, he was blye, in Scotland's cause"	"For Willie Soutar"	1943
