= Elizabeth Dundas =

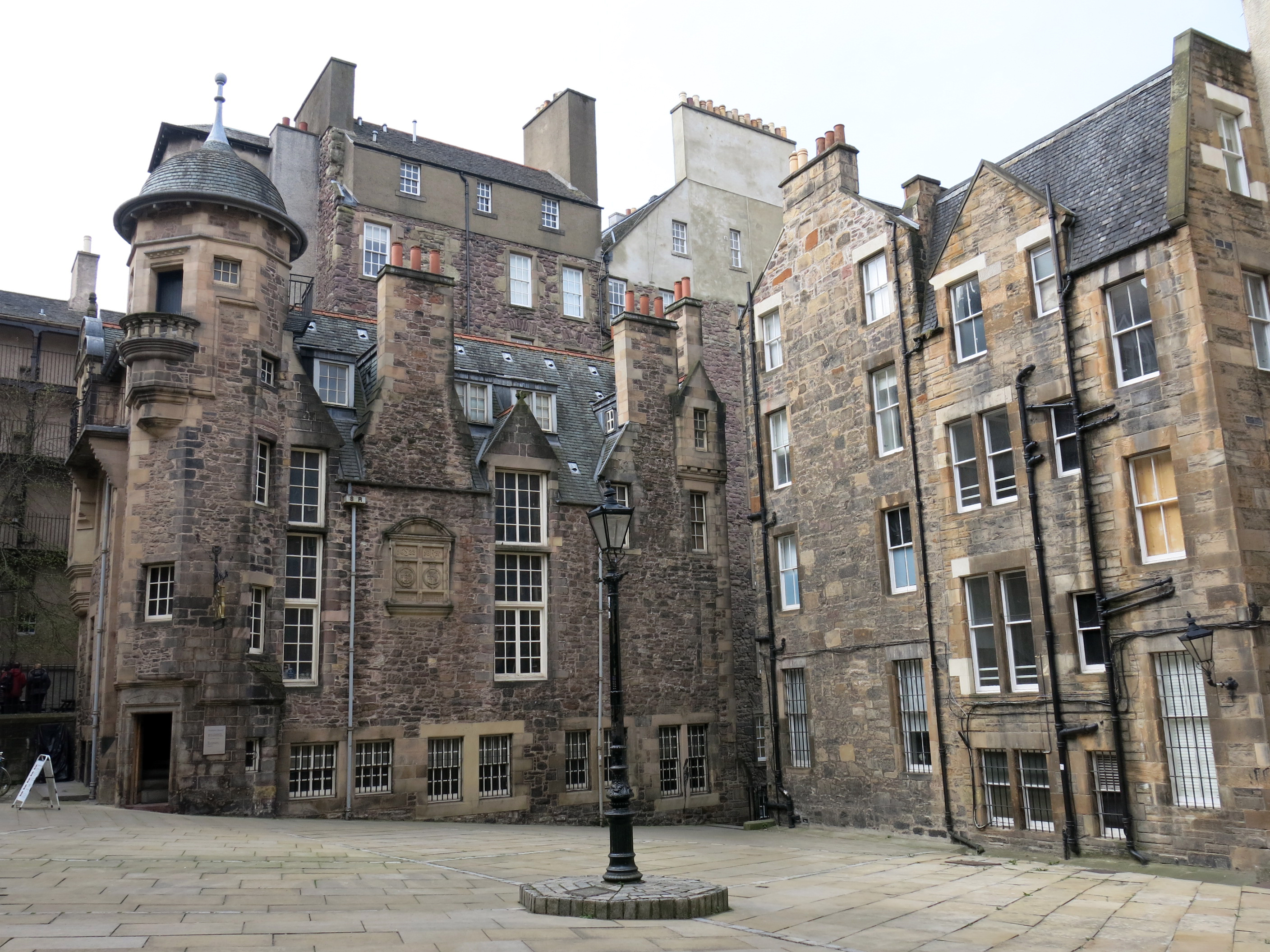
Lady Stairs House, Lawnmarket, Edinburgh

Elizabeth Dalrymple, Countess of Stair (née Dundas; 1650 – 25 May 1731), was a Scottish noblewoman and one-time owner of Lady Stair's House in Edinburgh's Old Town.

== Early life ==
Elizabeth was born in 1650, the daughter of Sir John Dundas of Newliston and his wife Agnes Gray. She was the granddaughter of Sir William Gray of Pittendrum, and his wife Egidia or Geida Smith.

She had one brother, John Dundas, who was born in 1639.

== Marriage and later life ==
In 1655 Elizabeth inherited the bankrupt estates of her father.

In 1667 she was forcibly abducted. Although this was investigated, no conviction was made.

Around 1668/69 she married John Dalrymple, 1st Earl of Stair (1648–1707). Between 1670-1680 she had six sons and four daughters, although only three sons and one daughter survived childhood.

She died on 25 May 1731, aged 81.

== Lady Stair's House ==
Elizabeth's grandparents, Sir William Gray and Egidia Smith, built the house now known as Lady Stair's House in 1622.

By 1719 Elizabeth was a widow, and she bought her grandparents' house, known then as Lady Gray's House after her grandmother. It was originally left to her mother's younger sister. She lived here until her death in 1731.

In 1765 the house was sold by her grandson, John Dalrymple of Newliston (later 5th Earl of Stair).
