= Lady Stair's Close =

Close in Edinburgh, Scotland

Coordinates: 55°57′00″N 3°11′38″W

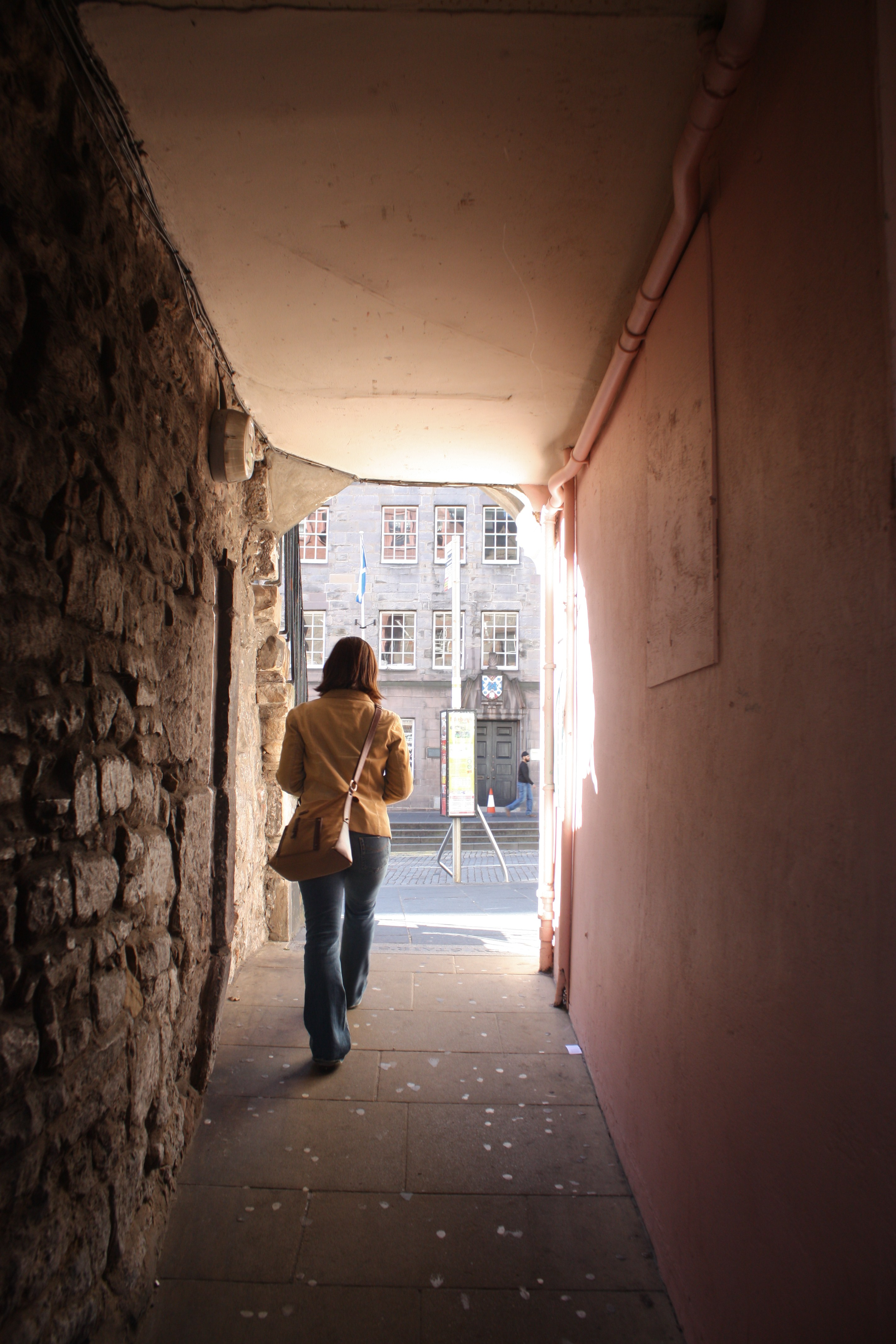
Exiting Lady Stair's Close onto Lawnmarket (the Royal Mile).

Lady Stair's Close (477 Lawnmarket) is a close in Edinburgh, Scotland, just off the Royal Mile, close to the entrance to Gladstone's Land. Most notably it contains the Scottish Writers' Museum.

== History ==
Located in Edinburgh's Lawnmarket, Lady Stair's Close is the location of a 17th-century townhouse called Lady Stair's House built in 1622 for Sir William Gray of Pittendrum, an Edinburgh Baronet. It was originally called Lady Gray's House after the widow of the first proprietor. She was the mother of the Scots Worthy Andrew Gray whose books became well-known despite dying at an early age. It was then bought in 1719 by Elizabeth Dundas, Lady Stair, the widow of John Dalrymple (1648 - 1707) the 1st Earl of Stair, hence its present name.

The close contains the Makars' Court - inscribed stones to the great names of Scottish literature.

== Writers' Museum ==
The Writers' Museum, belonging to the city of Edinburgh, contains memorabilia which celebrate the lives of three writers who all at one time lived in Edinburgh: Sir Walter Scott, Robert Louis Stevenson, and Robert Burns. Burns stayed in a house in Baxter's Close (since demolished) to the east of Lady Stair's Close during his first trip to Edinburgh in 1786.

== See also ==
- List of closes on the Royal Mile

== Gallery ==
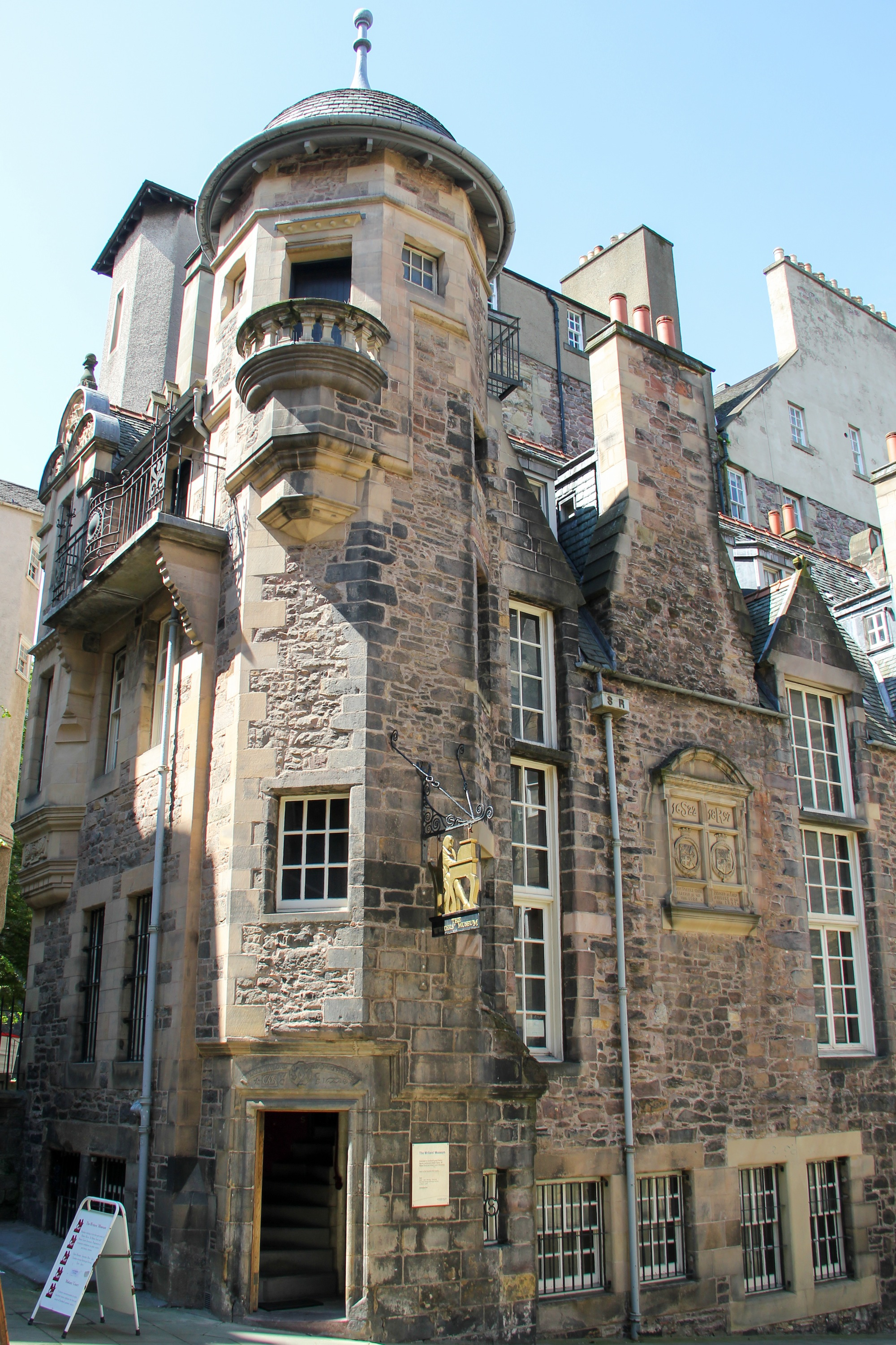
Scottish Writers' Museum at the Lady Stair's Close

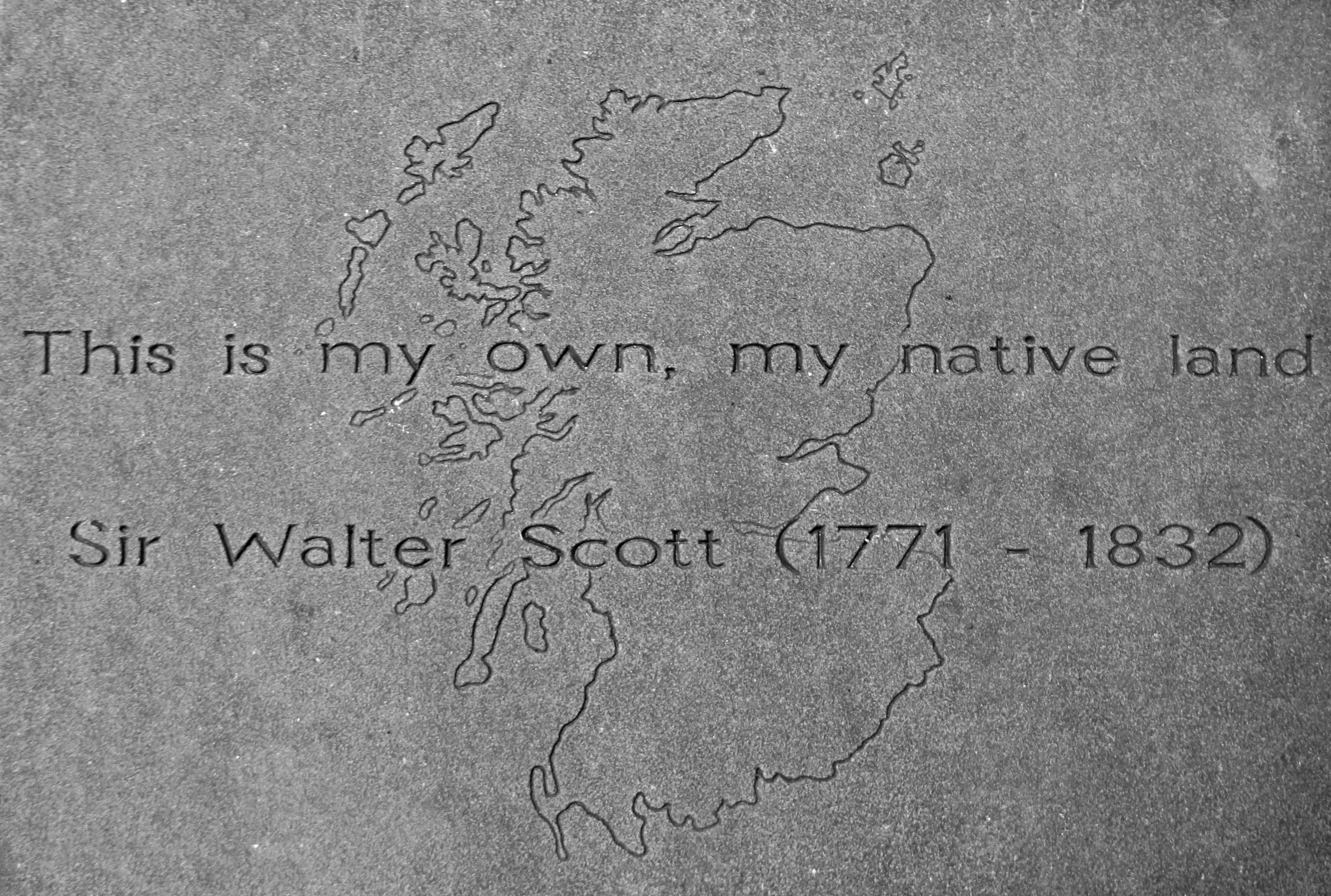
Sir Walter Scott's stone slab at the Lady Stair's Close

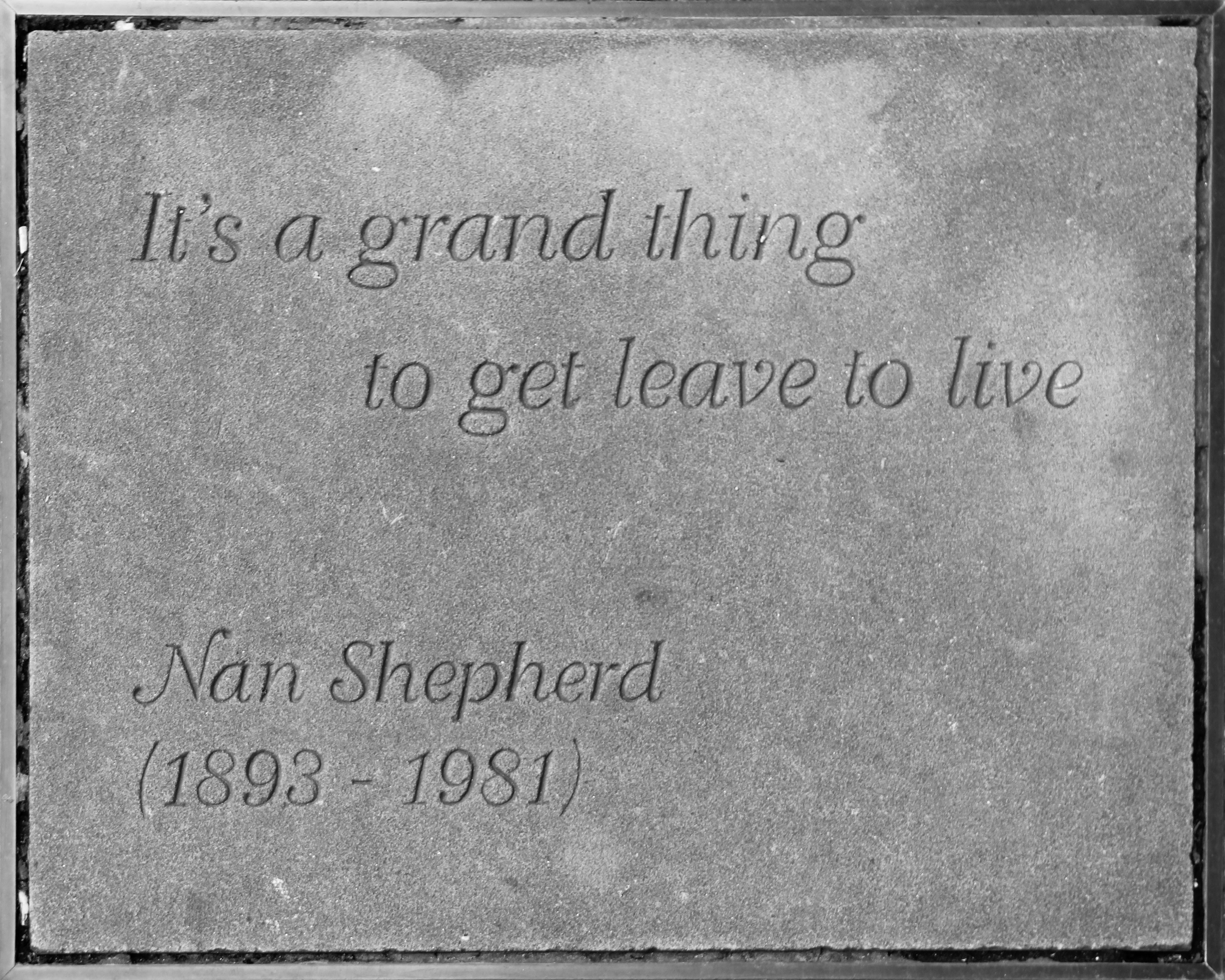
Nan Shepherd's stone slab at the Lady Stair's Close
