= Lady Stair's House =

Building in Scotland

Coordinates: 55.949653°N 3.193686°W

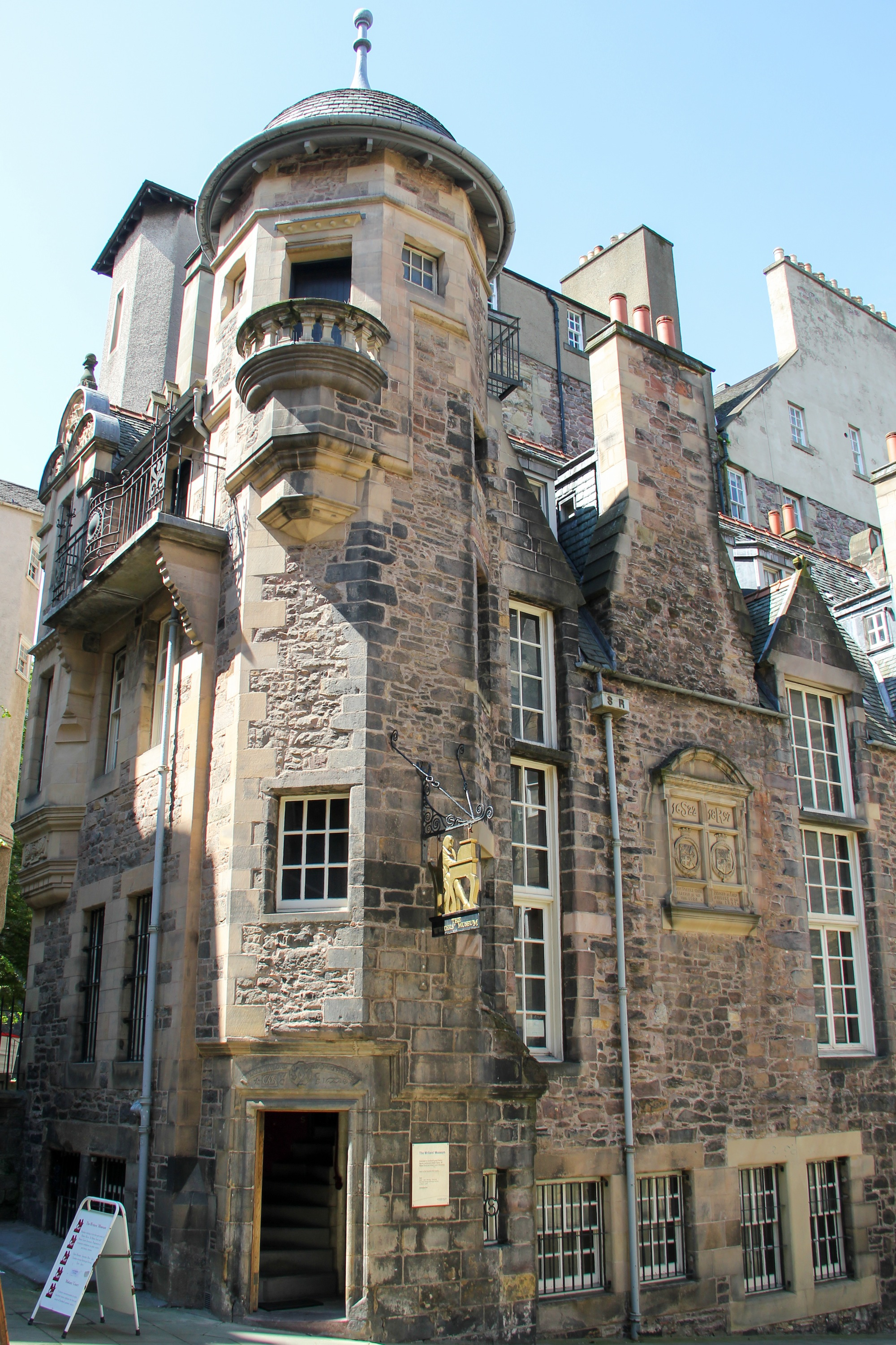
Lady Stair's House in 2012

Lady Stair's House is a 17th-century townhouse in Lady Stair's Close, off the Lawnmarket, in Edinburgh's Old Town. It now houses the Writers' Museum, dedicated to the lives and works of various Scottish literary greats.

The house was built in 1622 for Sir William Gray of Pittendrum and his wife Giles (née Smith). A lintel above the door bears the date of construction and the initials WG and GS, along with a coat of arms and the motto "feare the Lord and depart from evill". It was previously known as Lady Gray's House, Giles having resided there for several years after her husband's death. The present name derives from Elizabeth Dalrymple, Dowager Countess of Stair, who acquired the house in 1719. It remained in the possession of the Dalrymple family until 1765, after which it passed through the hands of a succession of owners. In 1895, at the suggestion of the town planner and preservationist Patrick Geddes, it was purchased by Archibald Primrose, 5th Earl of Rosebery, a descendant of the original occupants. Rosebery commissioned the architect George Shaw Aitken to conduct a thorough restoration of the building, and presented it to the city of Edinburgh in 1907. Since then it has been used as a museum, first of civic history and then of literary history. It was designated a Category A listed building in 1970.

== Gallery ==
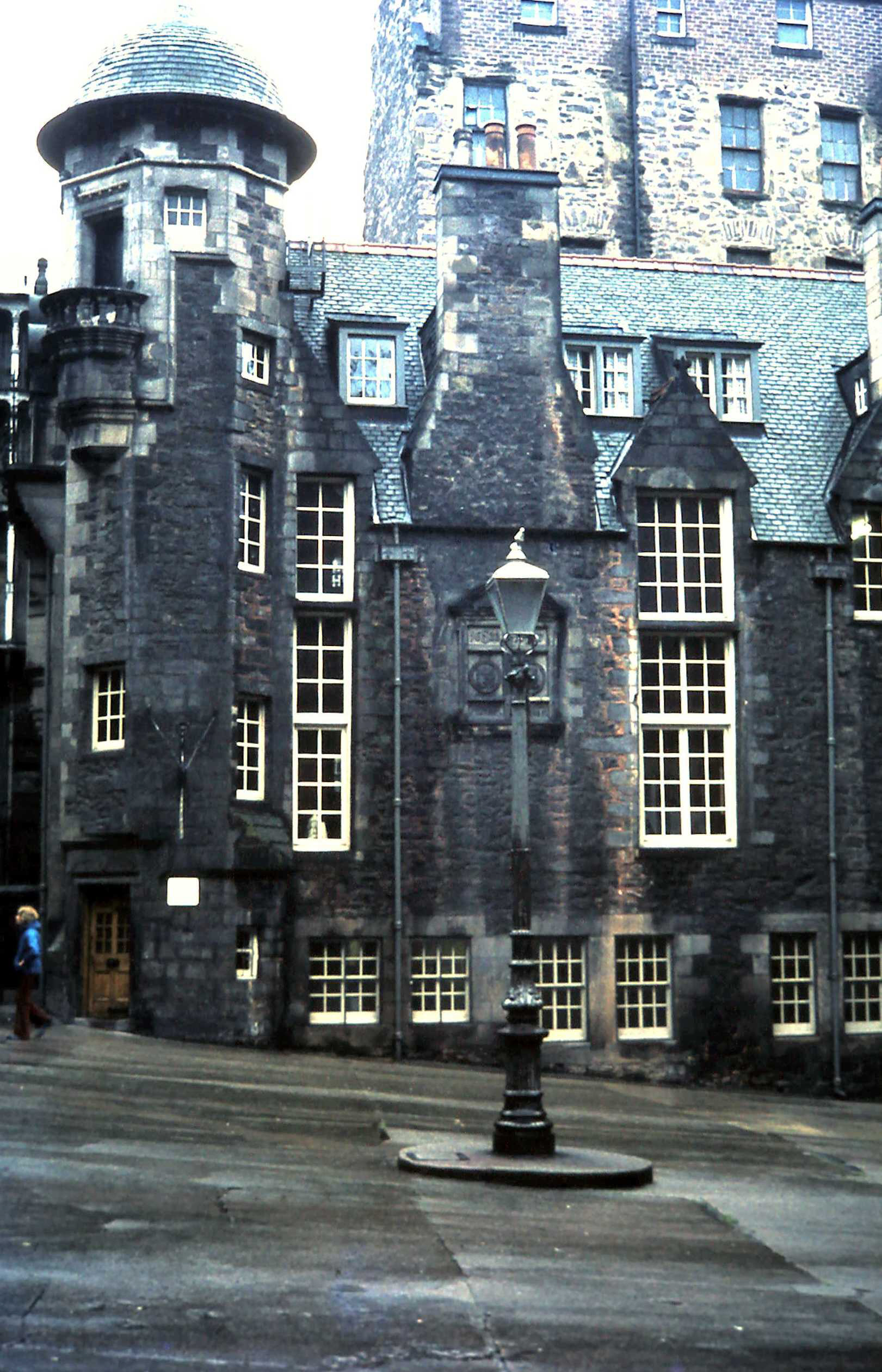
The house in 1972

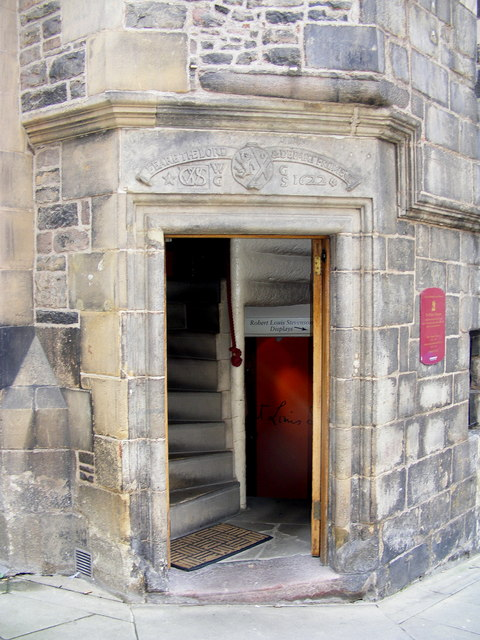
Entrance to the house

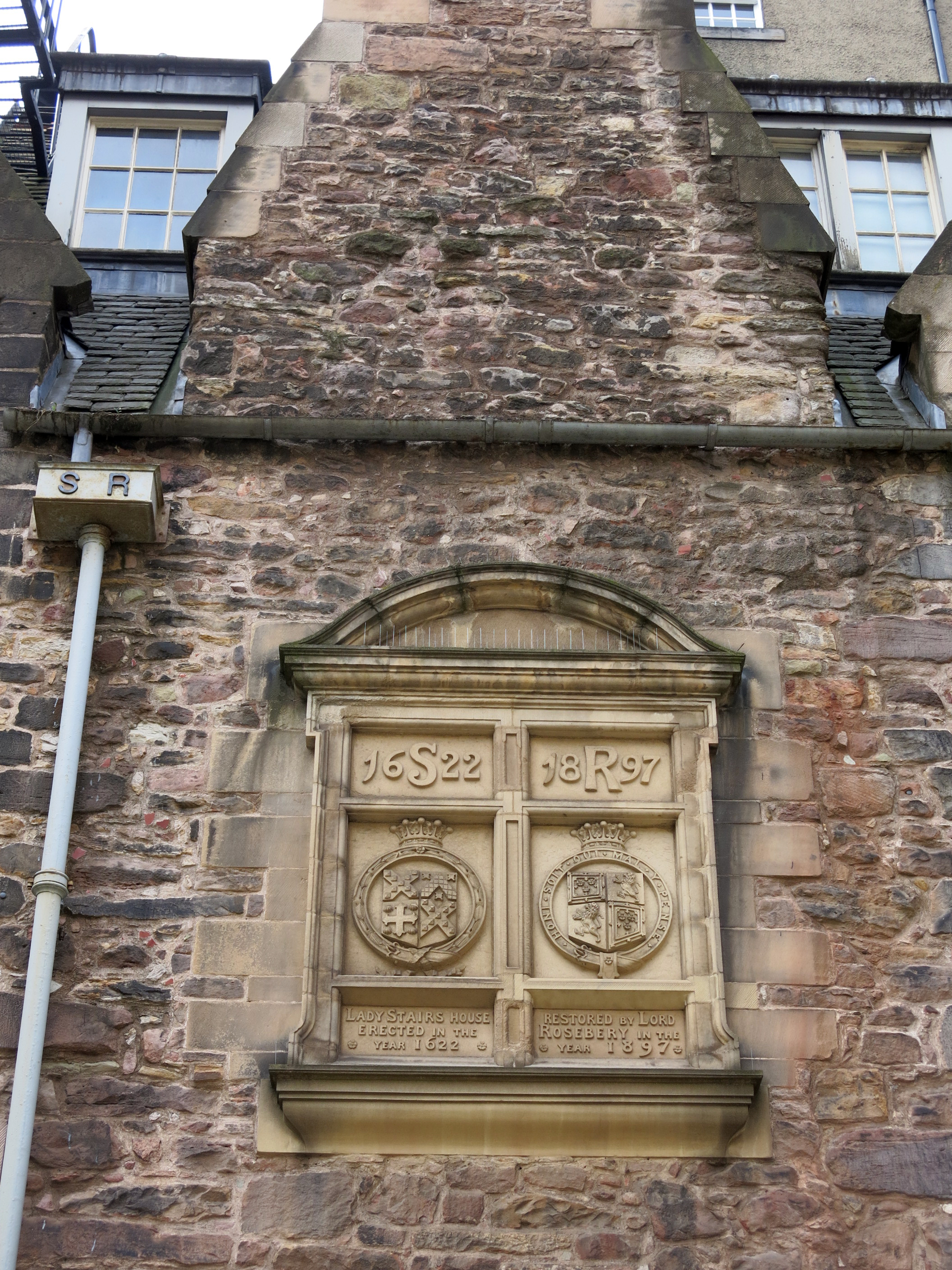
Panel showing the arms of the Earls of Stair and Rosebery

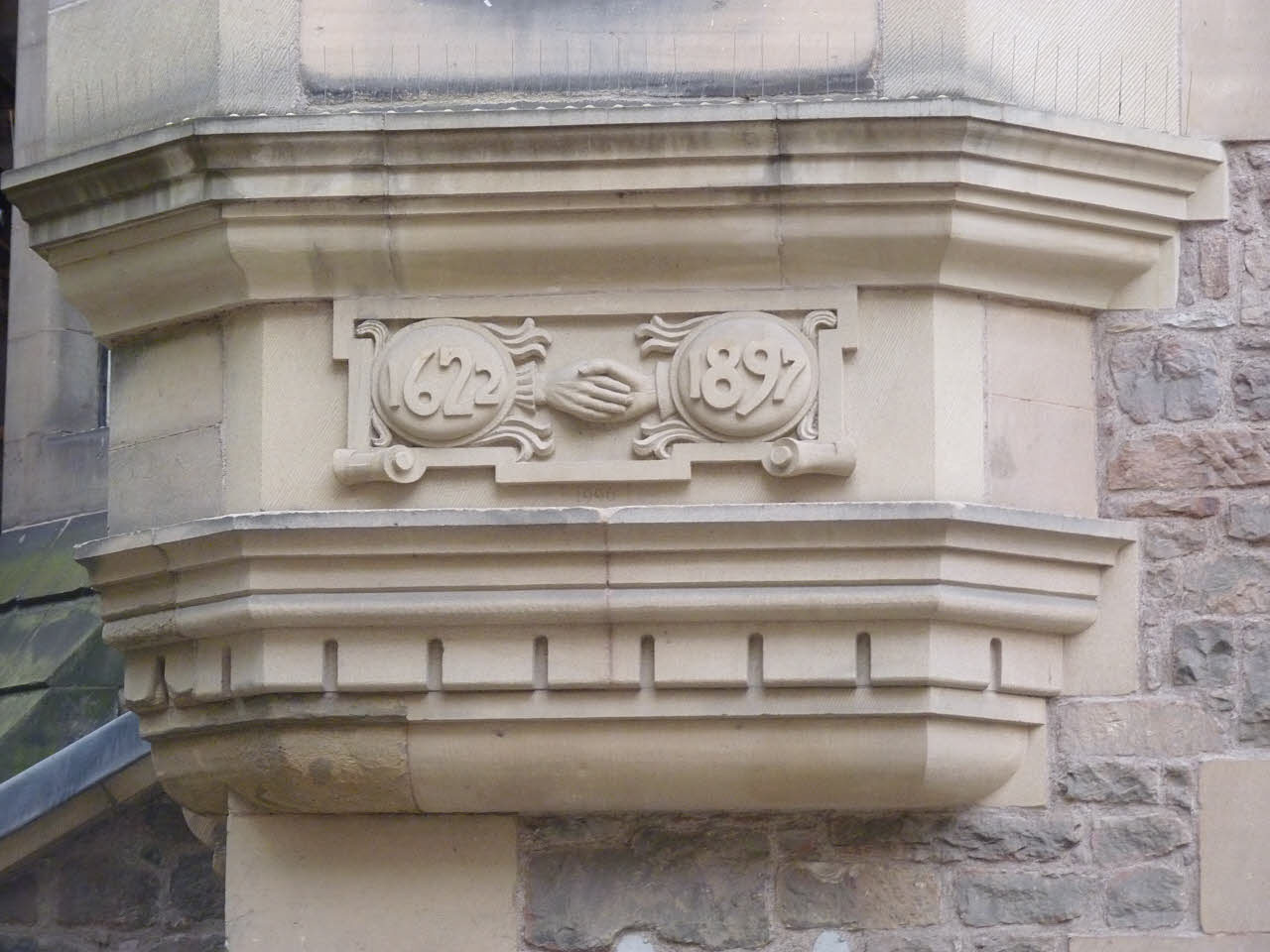
Panel showing the dates of construction and reconstruction

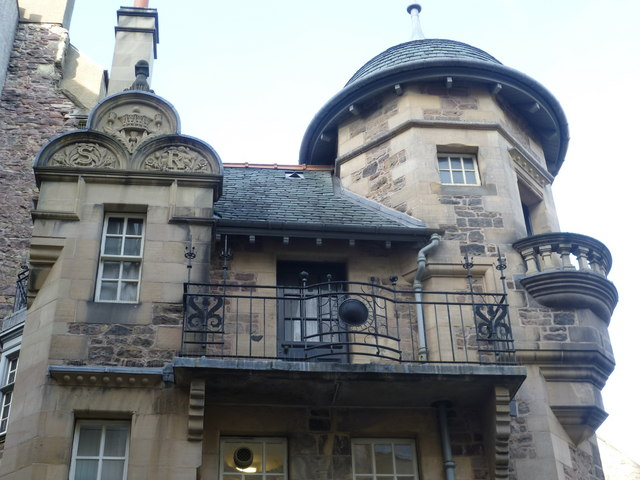
Upper storey and balcony

== See also ==
- List of listed buildings in Edinburgh
- Writers' Museum
