= Writers' Museum =

Museum in Edinburgh, Scotland

Coordinates: 55.9497°N 3.1937°W

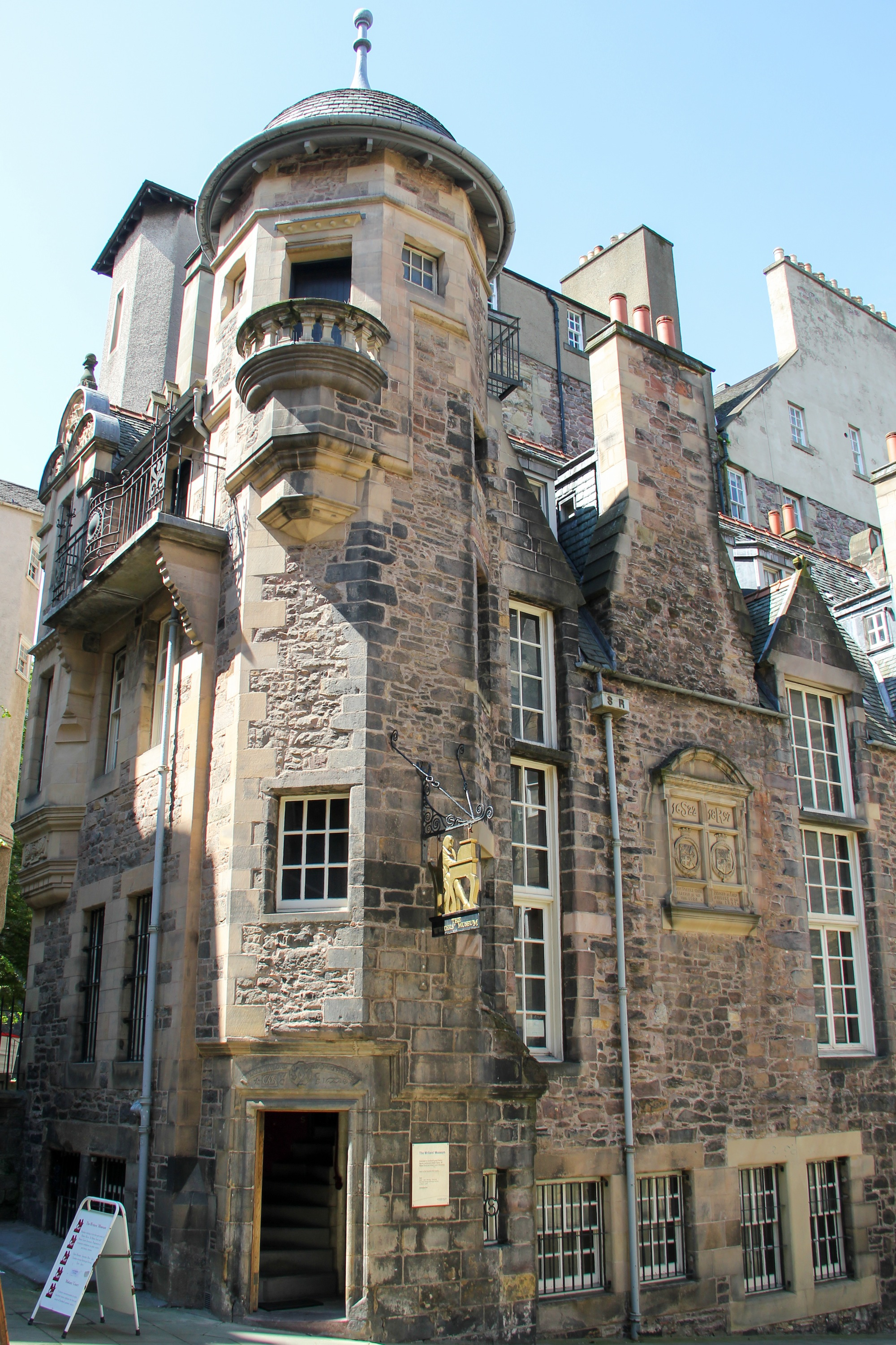
The Scottish Writers' Museum located at Lady Stair's Close in Edinburgh, Scotland.

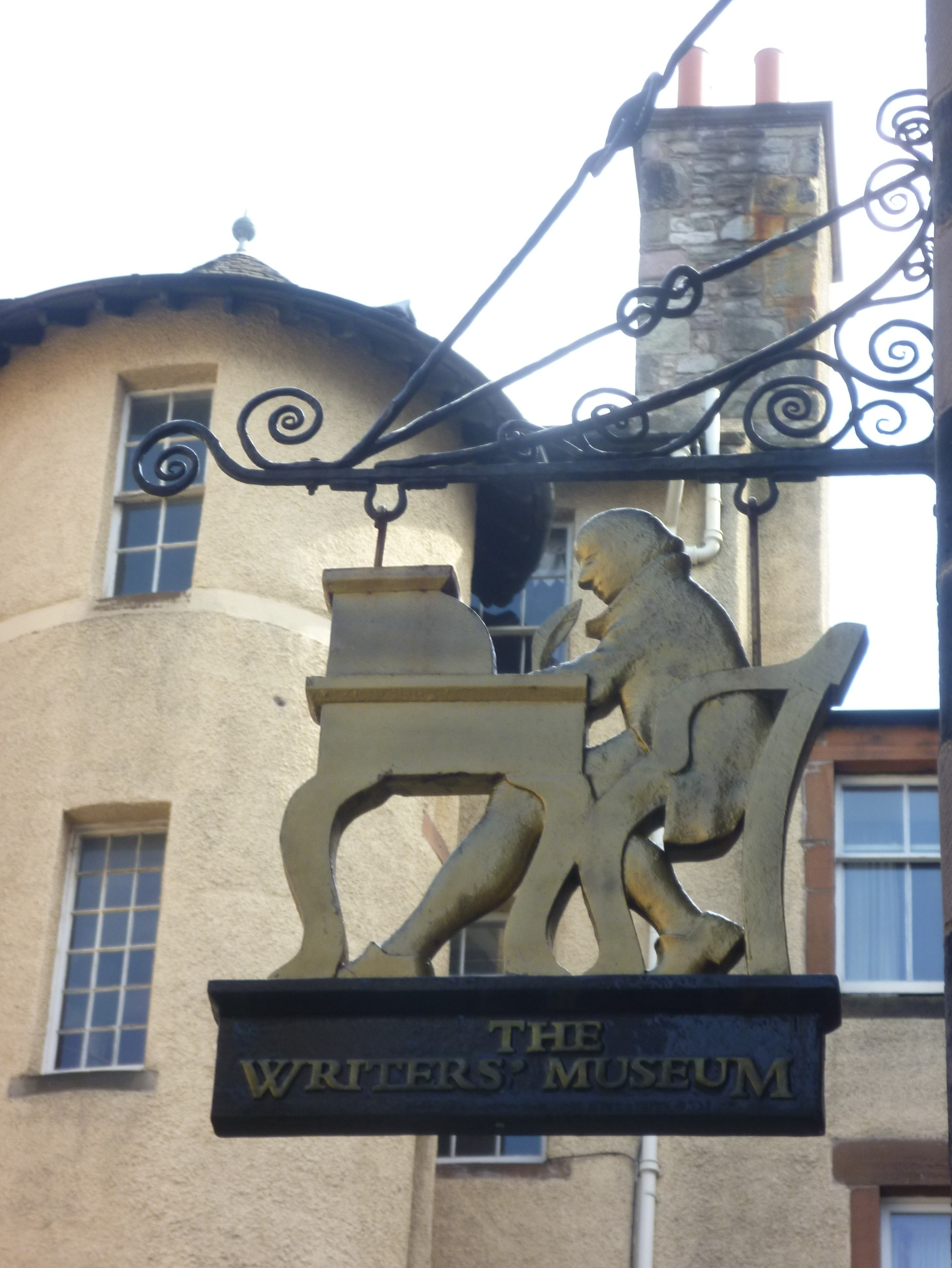
Writers' Museum sign

The Writers’ Museum, housed within Lady Stair's House in Edinburgh, presents the lives of three of the foremost Scottish writers: Robert Burns, Walter Scott and Robert Louis Stevenson. Run by the City of Edinburgh Council, the collection includes portraits, works and personal objects. The museum lies within Makars' Court, which has been described as an "evolving national literary monument".

== Exhibits ==
=== Robert Burns ===
- Invitation card to the Scottish Burns Club's Annual Supper (1994)

The invitation reads:

Scottish Burns Club, Edinburgh Founded 1920, "The Heart ay's the pairt ay"

Seventy-First Annual Supper

Napier University

Craiglockhart Campus

219 Colinton Road, Edinburgh

Saturday 29th January 1994

6 for 6.30 pm

Seats to be taken by 6.15 Ticket £12.50

The menu is accompanied with a portrait of Robert Burns surrounded by drawings of poetic scenery. The seventy-first annual supper had on its menu egg mayonnaise, scotch broth, haggis, roast turkey, pear melba, and coffee. On the right of the menu is the toast list which reads as the following:

The Queen ・ ・ ・ ・ The Chairman

Interval

The Immortal Memory of Robert Burns Charles H. Johnston, M. A., LL. B. Advocate

Our Speaker ・ ・ ・ ・ The Chairman

The Lassies ・ ・ ・ J. Gibson Kerr

Reply ・ ・ Mrs. Dorothea Sharp

Our Guests and Kindred Clubs

D. McCallum Hay Immediate Past President

Reply ・ ・ ・ John Millar, J.P. President, Colinton Burns Club

Vote for Thanks to the Artists

J. A. Hiddleston

Reply ・ ・ ・ ・ George Peat

The Chairman ・ ・ ・ G. W. Walker Vice-President

Auld Lang Syne

- Robert Burns Display Soundtrack

The soundtrack is on loop, displaying extracts from letters and poems written by Robert Burns.

=== Walter Scott ===
- Chessboard and chessmen once owned by Sir Walter Scott

Beyond childhood, Scott spent his free time learning languages instead of mastering the game of chess, as written in J. G. Lockhart's biography Life of Sir Walter Scott. He apparently thought that time was better spent on the acquiring a new language and said, "Surely, chess playing is a sad waste of brains"

- Slippers - Gifted to Scott by Lady Honoria Louisa Cadogan, December 1830

The slippers are woven in pink and blue wool, lined with silk, and leather soled. The slippers became part of a collection of Scott-related items owned by Sir Hugh Walpole, who, a great admirer, thought himself as Scott's reincarnation.

Louisa Cadogan attached a letter to the gift, in which she recounts her and her daughters, Lady Augusta Sarah and Lady Honoria Louisa's visit to Abbotsford. They were prompted to gift Scott new slippers upon finding uncomfortable-looking slippers in the study. Cadogan wrote that the pattern of the slippers were based on a pair worn by Ghazi Khan in the fifteenth century.

- Part of a letter by Scott to J. G. Lockhart regarding demonology and witchcraft

Letters of Demonology and Witchcraft written by Scott took the form of ten letters addressed to Lockhart.

- Inkstand of Scott posthumously given to William Carmichael

Scott sometimes visited his legal assistant Carmichael in the evening, in which Carmichael would play the fiddle or give Scott some tunes for recently composed verses.

- The Ballantyne Press

The hand-press is reputed to have been used for printing the Waverley. The press was owned by James Ballantyne who printed many of Scott's works including Minstrelsy of the Scottish Border in 1802, which success prompted him to move to Paul's Work, North Back of Canongate, Edinburgh. In 1957, forty years after the discontinuation of the Edinburgh print-works, the firm then called Ballantyne and Company of London, gave this hand-press to the Victoria and Albert Museum who returned it to Edinburgh in October. The soundtrack of the exhibit displays a conversation between Mr. Hughes, the printing firm's chief workman, and his young apprentice.

=== Robert Louis Stevenson ===
- The Bible in Spain by George Borrow, 1869

Stevenson took the book with him on his "Travels with a Donkey", along many others.

- Illustration by Walter Crane, to "Travels with a Donkey in the Cevennes"

The illustration is based on the excerpt: "I lay lazily smoking and studying the colour of the sky, as we call the void of space, from where it showed a reddish-grey behind the pines to where it showed a glossy blue-black between the stars" (Travels with a Donkey).

- 'Moral Emblems: a Second Collection of Cuts and Verses', printed by LLoyd Osbourne at Villa-am-Stein, Davos-Platz, Winter 1881–2

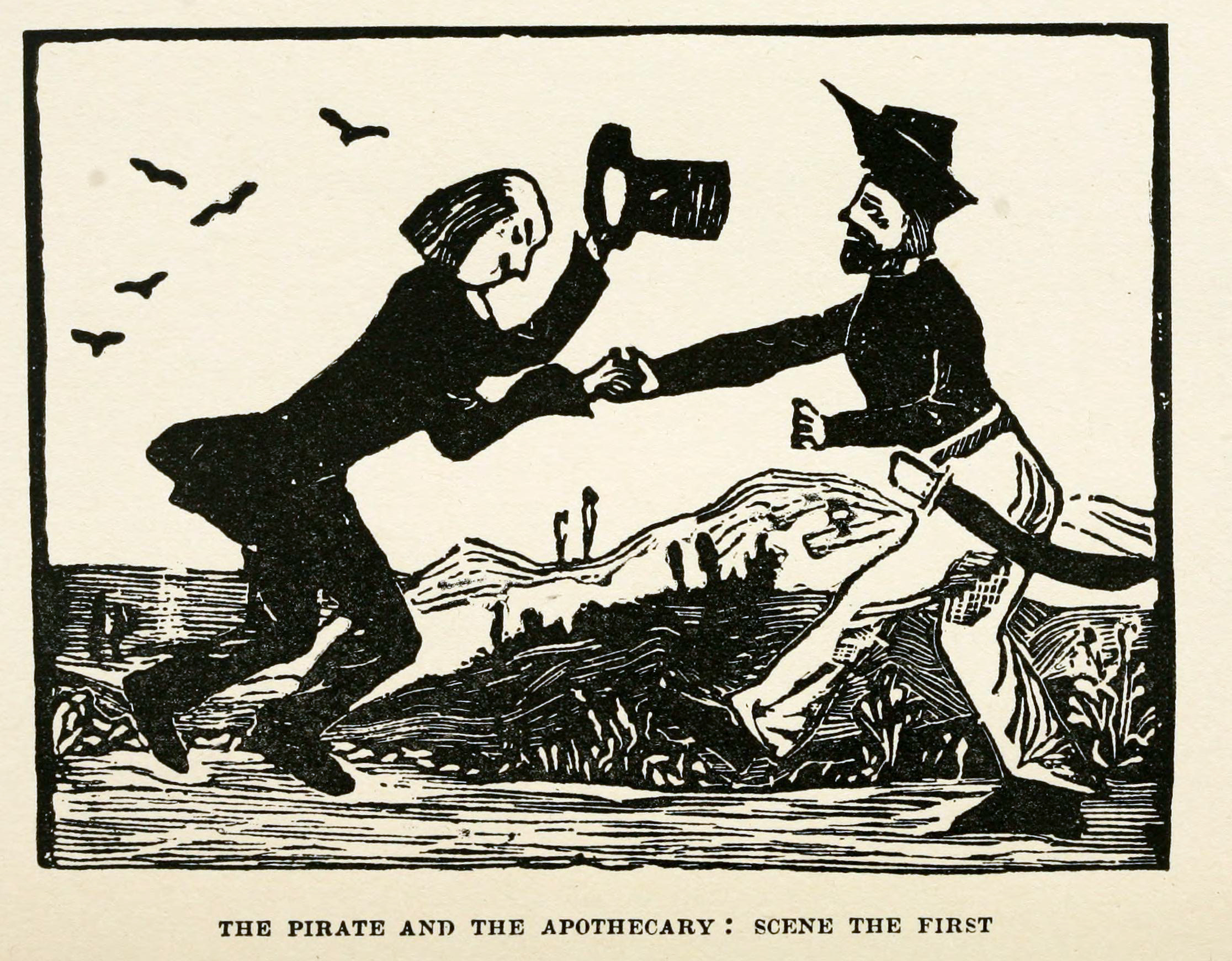
woodcut of "The Pirate and the Apothecary" by Stevenson

The collection includes "The Pirate and the Apothecary", in which a respectable chemist is revealed to be a hypocrite, while the pirate turns out to be the hero. The following is an excerpt:

Come lend me an attentive ear

A startling moral tale to hear,

Of Pirate Rob and Chemist Ben,

And different destinies of men.

- 10 Street scene

A paper sculpture left anonymously in the premises of several of Edinburgh's literary organisations, 10 Street Scene shows support of "libraries, books, words, and ideas" as well as an adoration for Ian Rankin and Robert Louis Stevenson. Its sides are made out of the covers of Hide and Seek, and showcases the scene in the Strange Case of Dr Jekyll and Mr Hyde in which Edward Hyde attacks a woman.

== Gallery ==
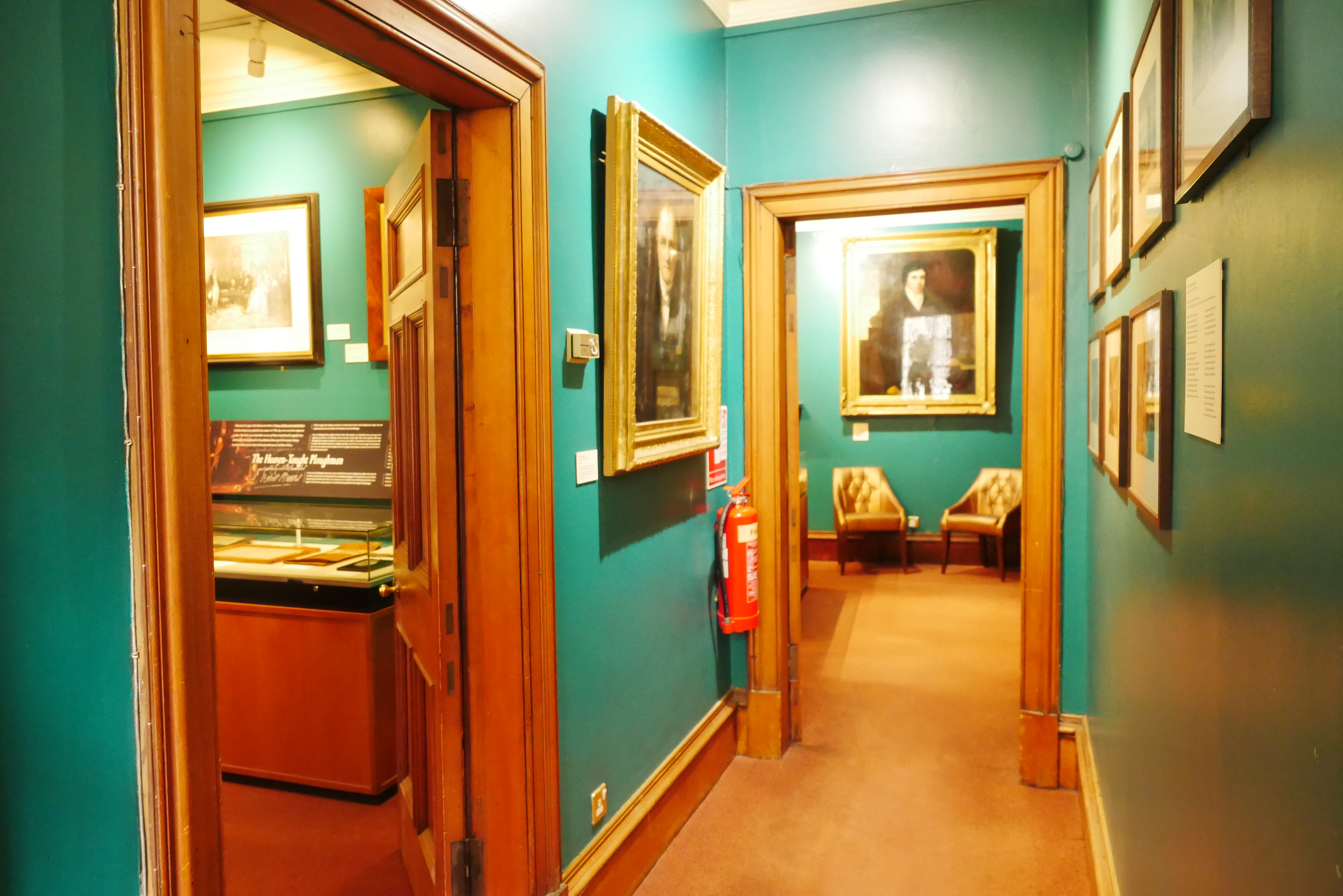
Interior and exhibit rooms

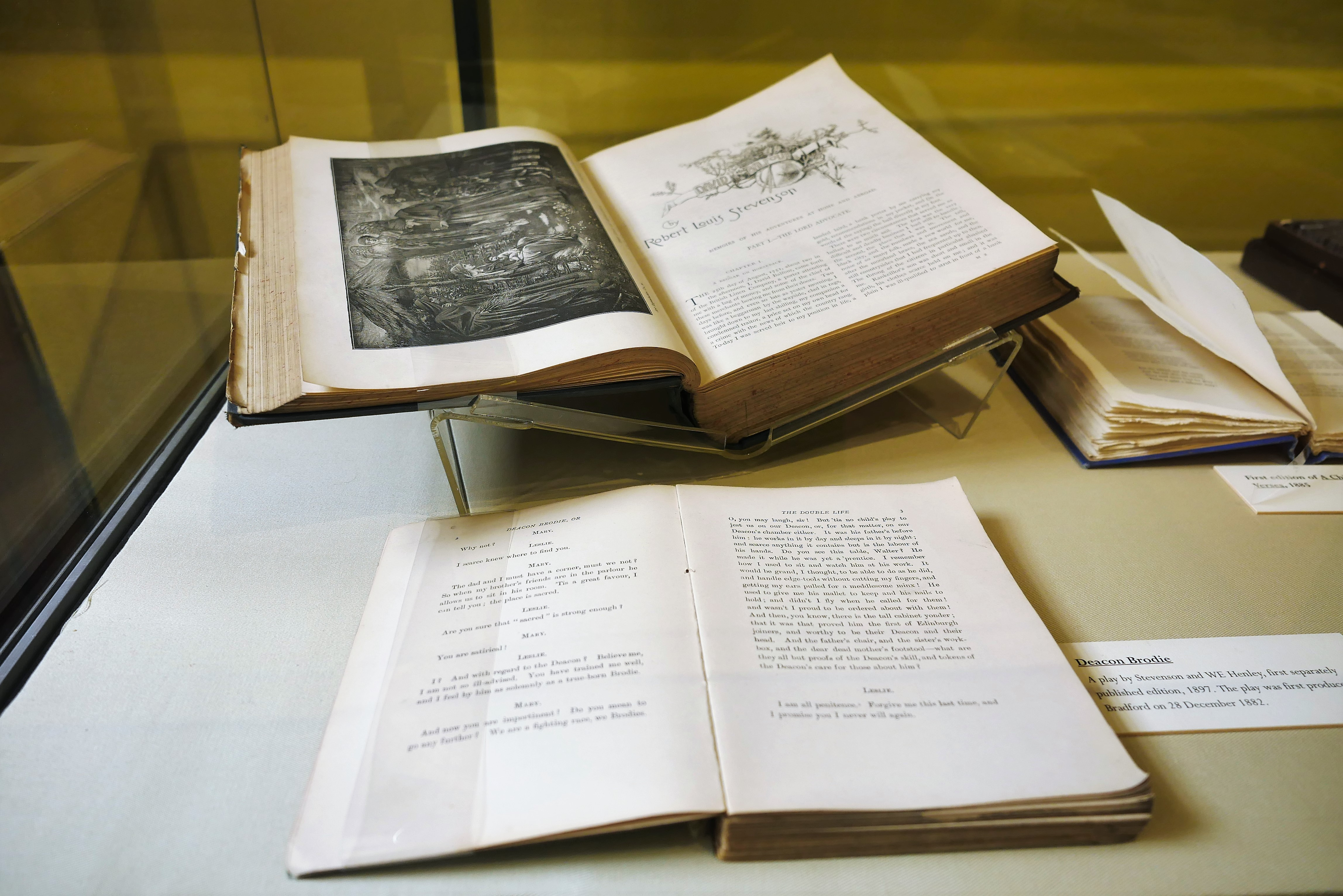
Display of Robert Louis Stevenson books

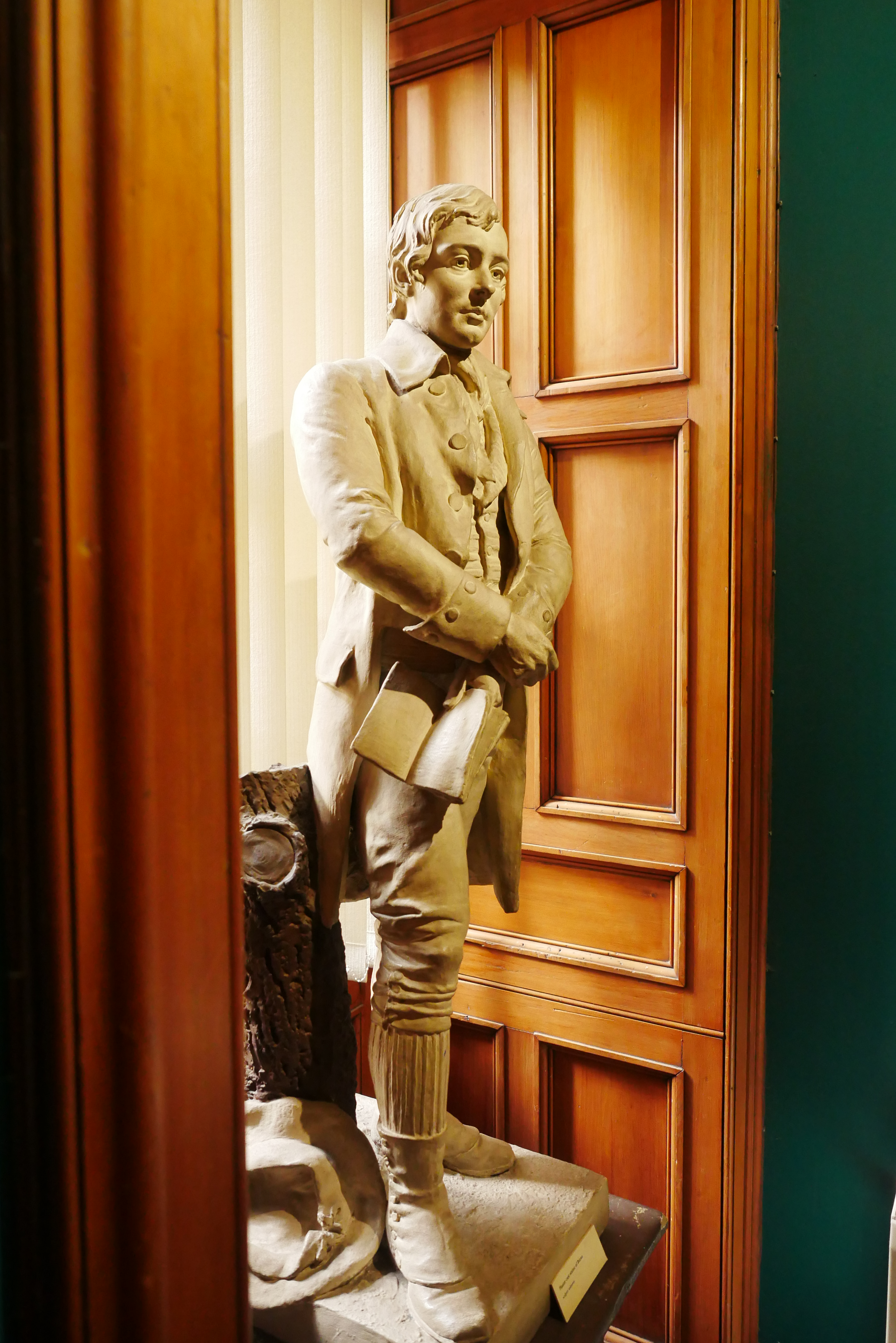
Statue of Robert Burns

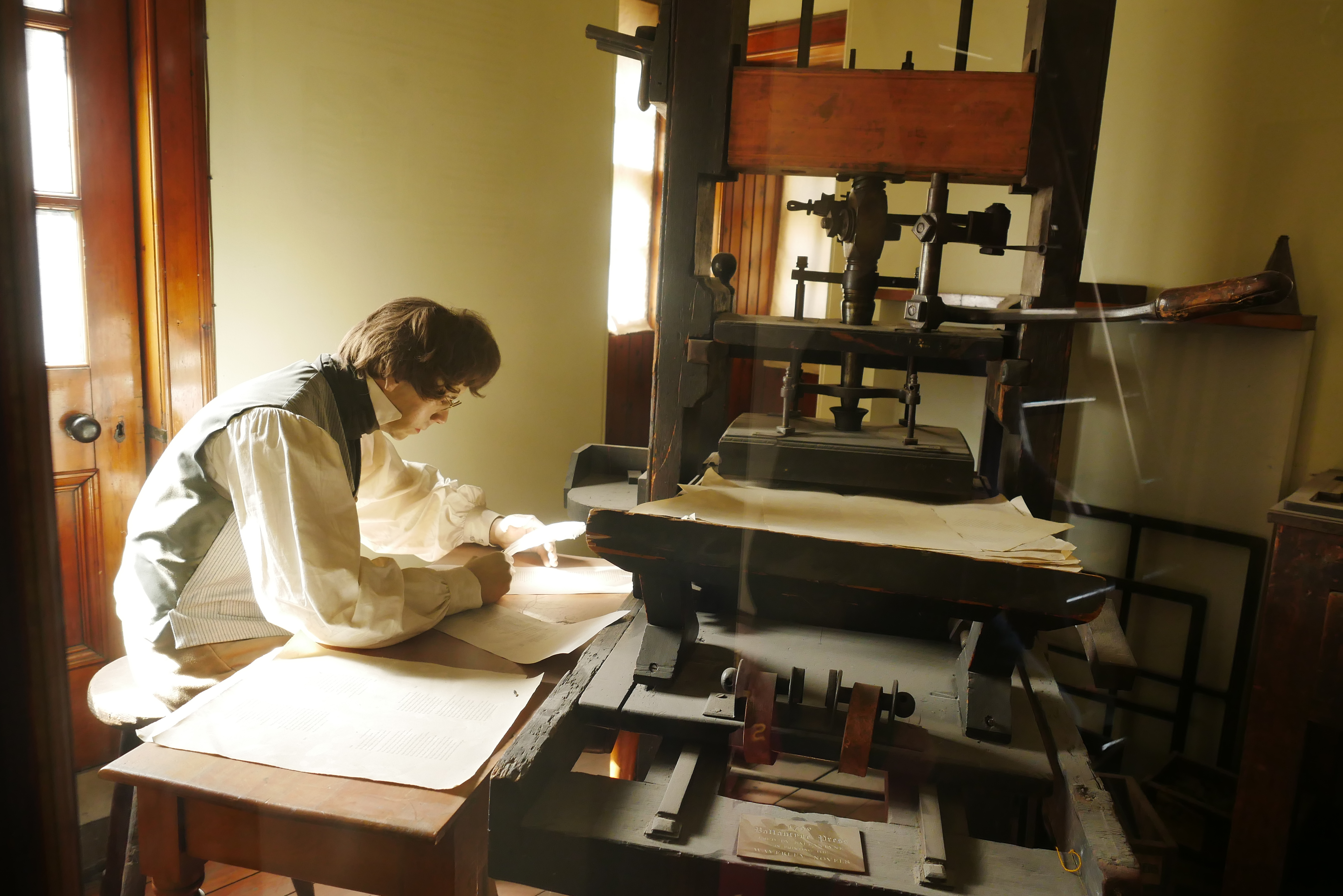
Ballantyne display

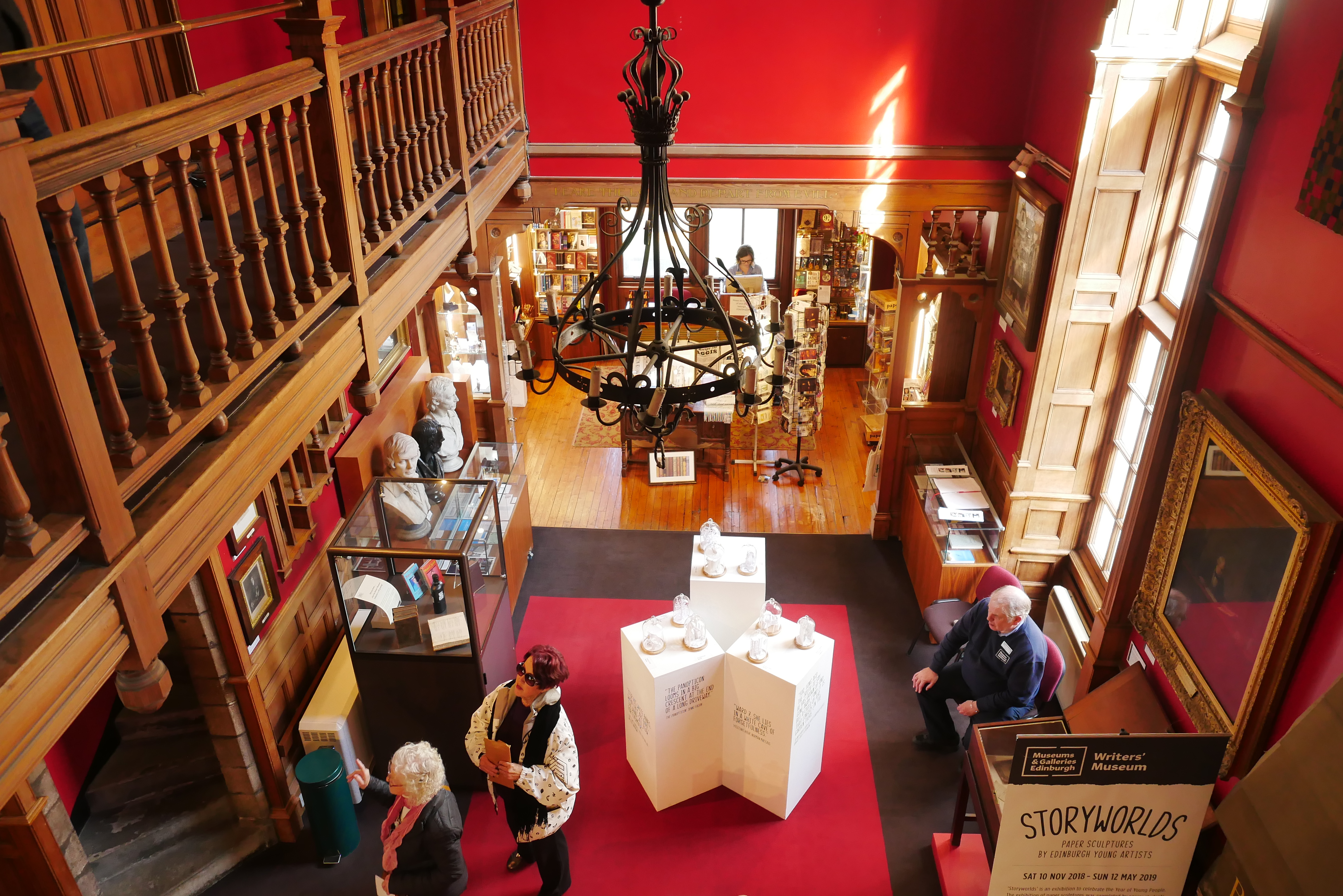
Gift shop and exhibits

== See also ==
- List of museums in Scotland
