= List of Category A listed buildings in Edinburgh =

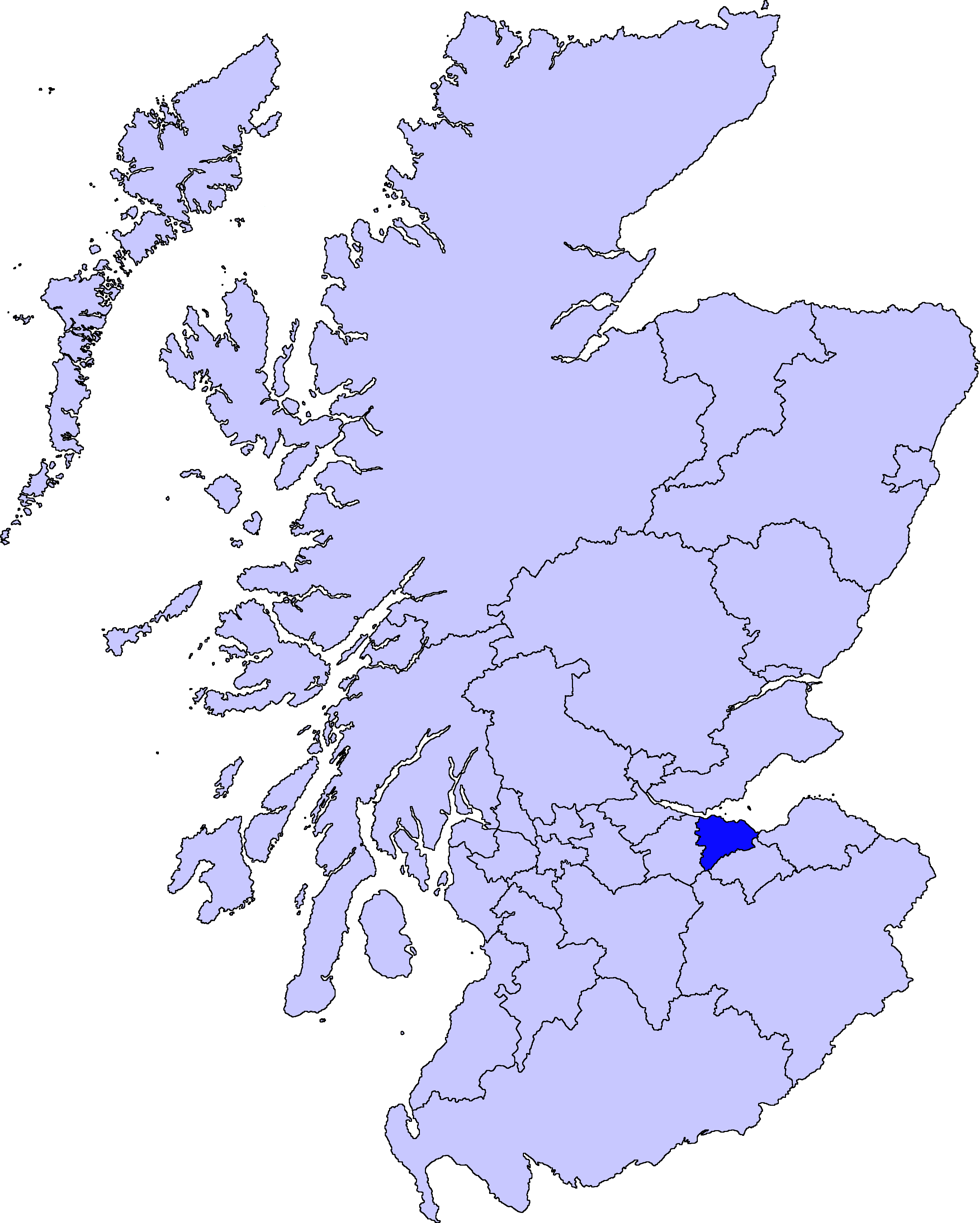
Edinburgh shown within Scotland

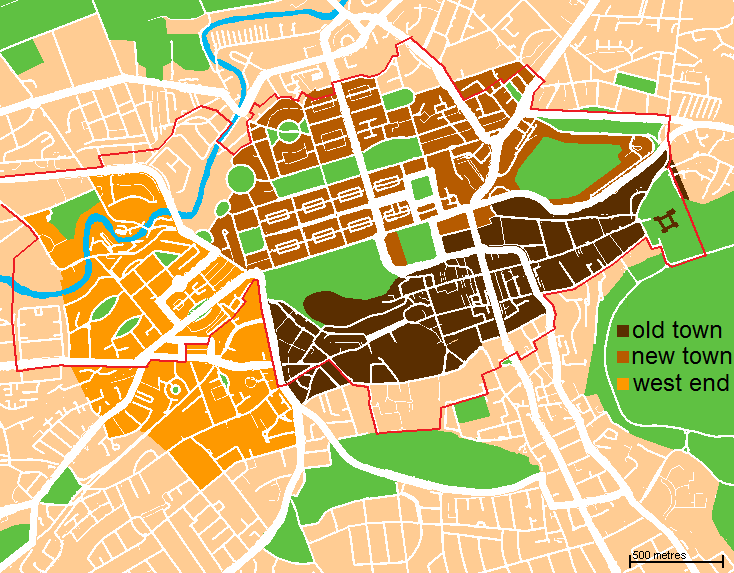
Sketch map of Edinburgh. The Old Town (dark brown) and New Town (light brown) areas are separately listed

This is a list of Category A listed buildings in Edinburgh, Scotland. This list contains all buildings outside the New Town and Old Town areas; those can be found at List of Category A listed buildings in the New Town, Edinburgh and List of Category A listed buildings in the Old Town, Edinburgh

In Scotland, the term listed building refers to a building or other structure officially designated as being of "special architectural or historic interest". Category A structures are those considered to be "buildings of national or international importance, either architectural or historic, or fine little-altered examples of some particular period, style or building type." Listing was begun by a provision in the Town and Country Planning (Scotland) Act 1947, and the current legislative basis for listing is the Planning (Listed Buildings and Conservation Areas) (Scotland) Act 1997. The authority for listing rests with Historic Environment Scotland, an executive non-departmental public body of the Scottish Government, which inherited this role from Historic Scotland in 2015. Once listed, severe restrictions are imposed on the modifications allowed to a building's structure or its fittings. Listed building consent must be obtained from local authorities prior to any alteration to such a structure. There are approximately 47,400 listed buildings in Scotland, of which around 8% (some 3,800) are Category A.

The council area of Edinburgh covers 264 square kilometres (102 sq mi), and has a population of just under 500,000. Edinburgh is centred on the medieval Old Town and the Georgian New Town. To the north is the historic port of Leith, on the shore of the Firth of Forth which is now built up from Cramond to Portobello. The modern city now extends south to the Pentland Hills. Edinburgh council area also includes a rural area to the west, containing several villages including South Queensferry, Kirkliston and Balerno.

There are over 4,500 listed buildings in Edinburgh, of which around 900 are listed at category A. This is many more than any in other council area in Scotland, represents almost 25% of all category A listings in the country and is more than any other city in the world. Buildings protected range from tiny St Margaret's Chapel, the oldest building in Edinburgh, to the Forth Road Bridge, Scotland's longest suspension bridge, opened in 1964.

== Listed buildings ==
- For New Town buildings, see List of Category A listed buildings in the New Town, Edinburgh
- For Old Town buildings, see List of Category A listed buildings in the Old Town, Edinburgh

Name	Location	Date listed	Geo-coordinates	Notes	LB number	Image
Dalmeny House	Dalmeny	22 February 1971	55°59′17″N 3°20′05″W	William Wilkins, 1814-17. 2-storey Tudor Gothic country house.	82	Upload another image See more images
Dundas Castle	near South Queensferry	22 February 1971	55°58′31″N 3°24′52″W		5512	Upload another image See more images
Fountain Sundial	Dundas Castle, near South Queensferry	22 February 1971	55°58′31″N 3°24′49″W		5513	Upload Photo
Barnbougle Castle	Dalmeny House, Dalmeny	30 January 1981	55°59′31″N 3°20′06″W	James Maitland Wardrop (Wardrop and Reid), 1881, on site of and incorporating fabric from earlier castle	5548	Upload another image See more images
Sundials	Craigiehall, near Cramond	30 January 1981	55°57′52″N 3°20′15″W	Two 17th-century sundials at Craigiehall	5559	Upload Photo
Dalmeny Kirk (St Cuthbert's)	Dalmeny	22 February 1971	55°58′58″N 3°22′21″W	Church of Scotland. Listing includes kirkyard.	5570	Upload another image See more images
Baberton House	Baberton	22 January 1971	55°54′33″N 3°17′45″W		6129	Upload Photo
Currie Parish Church (St Kentigern's)	Currie	22 January 1971			6139	Upload another image See more images
The Out of the Blue Drill Hall	Leith	13 March 1995	55°57′53″N 3°10′27″W		26729	Upload another image See more images
Addistoun Dovecot		22 January 1971	55°54′42″N 3°21′17″W		26697	Upload another image See more images
Bavelaw Castle	South of Balerno	22 January 1971	55°51′04″N 3°19′53″W		26701	Upload another image See more images
Barclay-Bruntsfield Church and Church Hall	1 Wright's Houses, Bruntsfield	14 December 1970	55°56′25″N 3°12′12″W		26720	Upload another image See more images
31 Bellfield Street		14 December 1970	55°57′08″N 3°06′27″W		26749	Upload Photo
Former Leith Central Station offices, including Central and Northern Bars	7-23 Leith Walk and 2 - 22 Duke Street	15 July 1983	55°58′13″N 3°10′18″W		26781	Upload another image See more images
Custom House	67 Commercial Street, EH6 6LH	14 December 1970	55°58′36″N 3°10′15″W		26787	Upload another image See more images
Cockburn House (Cockburn Farm Dairy)	1 Cockburn Farm	22 January 1971	55°52′18″N 3°21′51″W	With boundary wall and sundials	26792	Upload Photo
25 Bernard Street and 24 and 25 Maritime Street		14 December 1970	55°58′32″N 3°10′04″W		26809	Upload another image
Cluny Church Centre	15 Braid Road	14 December 1970		Former South Morningside Free Church and Morningisde South Church	26810	Upload another image See more images
27-31 Bernard Street and 1 Seaport Street		14 December 1970	55°58′32″N 3°10′05″W		26821	Upload Photo
72-98 Commercial Street	Leith	9 January 1987	55°58′38″N 3°10′26″W	Incorporates Bond 42 and 63/1X2 and 64/1, 2, Gf and 1F), and 13-15 Dock Place with Gatepiers and Railings	26825	Upload another image
Bonnington House	near Wilkieston	22 January 1971	55°54′24″N 3°25′23″W		26826	Upload another image See more images
Merchiston Castle	Colinton Road	14 July 1966	55°56′00″N 3°12′50″W	Now part of Napier University	26828	Upload another image See more images
102 Commercial Street, Bonds 46, 48 and 35 (Highland and Queen, West Warehouses)	Leith	9 January 1987	55°58′39″N 3°10′31″W		26838	Upload Photo
Bonnington Dovecot	Bonnington House, Bonnington	22 January 1971	55°54′26″N 3°25′22″W		26839	Upload another image
St Michael's Parish Church	Slateford Road	14 December 1970	55°56′12″N 3°13′38″W		26846	Upload another image See more images
Former Catholic Apostolic Church	Mansfield Place and East London Street	22 September 1965	55°57′35″N 3°11′26″W	Latter Bellevue Reformed Baptist Church	26849	Upload another image See more images
Bonnington Sundial	Bonnington House, Bonnington	13 January 1975	55°54′24″N 3°25′25″W		26853	Upload Photo
Carlowrie House		30 January 1981	55°57′20″N 3°22′33″W		26879	Upload another image See more images
Corstorphine Old Parish Church	Corstorphine High Street	14 December 1970	55°56′29″N 3°16′55″W		26888	Upload another image See more images
Clifton Hall	Newbridge	30 January 1981	55°55′23″N 3°25′35″W	Currently occupied by Clifton Hall School	26891	Upload another image
Haymarket Station Entrance and Office Block	Haymarket Terrace	27 October 1964	55°56′44″N 3°13′06″W		26901	Upload another image See more images
Cramond Parish Church	18 Cramond Glebe Road, Cramond	14 December 1970	55°58′40″N 3°18′00″W		26912	Upload another image See more images
Duddingston Parish Church	Old Church Lane, Duddingston	14 December 1970	55°56′28″N 3°08′56″W		26924	Upload another image See more images
Craigiehall Temple	Craigiehall, near Cramond	14 July 1966	55°57′36″N 3°19′50″W		26928	Upload Photo
19 Smith's Place		14 December 1970	55°58′01″N 3°10′23″W		26934	Upload another image
Dalmahoy Bridge	Dalmahoy Estate	22 January 1971	55°54′26″N 3°22′02″W	Crosses the Gogar Burn	26940	Upload Photo
Dovecot	Ravelrig Estate, 527 Lanark Road West	26 October 1994	55°53′09″N 3°20′39″W		27014	Upload Photo
Dalmahoy House		22 January 1971	55°54′14″N 3°22′10″W		27021	Upload another image See more images
St John The Evangelist (Roman Catholic Church)	35 Brighton Place	14 December 1970	55°57′06″N 3°06′55″W		27046	Upload Photo
Donaldson's Warehouse	3 Carpet Lane and 42 The Shore	12 December 1974	55°58′33″N 3°10′09″W		27078	Upload Photo
Liberton Parish Church	Kirkgate, Liberton	14 December 1970	55°54′48″N 3°09′39″W		27090	Upload another image See more images
Castle Gogar	Glasgow Road	14 July 1966	55°56′32″N 3°20′20″W		27092	Upload Photo
North Leith Parish Church	51 Madeira Street, Leith. EH6 4AX	14 December 1970	55°58′33″N 3°10′59″W		27134	Upload another image See more images
1 and 2 Lockharton Gardens		14 December 1970	55°55′35″N 3°13′56″W		27137	Upload Photo
Former Corn Exchange	29-31A and 35 Constitution Street	14 December 1970	55°58′33″N 3°09′58″W		27140	Upload another image See more images
Exchange Buildings	37-43 Constitution Street	14 December 1970	55°58′30″N 3°10′00″W		27147	Upload another image
Dovecot	Malleny Estate, Balerno	22 January 1971	55°53′05″N 3°20′11″W		27153	Upload another image
Malleny House	Balerno	22 January 1971	55°53′09″N 3°20′15″W		27172	Upload another image
Queens Hall	South Clerk Street	14 December 1970	55°56′28″N 3°10′54″W		27176	Upload another image See more images
Methodist Chapel	Nicolson Square	14 December 1970	55°56′44″N 3°11′10″W		27185	Upload another image See more images
Craigentinny Marbles	3C Craigentinny Crescent	14 December 1970	55°57′26″N 3°08′14″W	Mausoleum of William Henry Miller, MP	27191	Upload another image See more images
Restalrig Parish Church	Restalrig	14 December 1970	55°57′28″N 3°08′58″W		27250	Upload another image See more images
St Peter's Church (Roman Catholic)	77 Falcon Avenue	14 December 1970	55°55′50″N 3°12′22″W		27257	Upload another image See more images
Lammerburn	10 Napier Road	14 December 1970	55°56′00″N 3°12′58″W		27279	Upload Photo
Former William Ramsay Technical Institute	90-102(Even Nos) Inchview Terrace, Portobello Road	26 August 1989	55°57′26″N 3°07′28″W		27288	Upload Photo
Gogar Bank House	Gogar Station Road	8 March 1994	55°55′28″N 3°19′22″W		27292	Upload Photo
St Anne's Parish Church	St John's Road, Corstorphine	14 December 1970	55°56′32″N 3°16′24″W		27297	Upload another image See more images
Astley Ainslie Hospital, North and South Lodges	Grange	14 December 1970	55°55′43″N 3°12′04″W		27310	Upload another image
Hatton Estate, South Terrace Wall with Pavilions and Bath-House	near Ratho	22 January 1971	55°54′15″N 3°23′43″W		27334	Upload Photo
Hatton Estate, East Avenue Gates	near Ratho	22 January 1971	55°54′22″N 3°22′43″W		27341	Upload Photo
92 Constitution Street		14 December 1970	55°58′26″N 3°10′05″W		27344	Upload Photo
St Cuthbert's Episcopal Church	Westgarth Avenue	14 December 1970	55°54′27″N 3°15′13″W		27353	Upload Photo
Bowmont Tower	39 and 41 Greenhill Gardens	14 December 1970	55°55′58″N 3°12′20″W		27366	Upload another image
St. Georges West Church (Church of Scotland)	Shandwick Place	14 December 1970	55°56′58″N 3°12′38″W		27367	Upload another image See more images
North Gate Lodge, Riccarton Estate	Heriot Watt University, Riccarton	13 January 1975	55°55′01″N 3°19′16″W		27369	Upload Photo
Quayside Mills (McGregor & Co)	3-9 Quayside Street, EH6 6EJ	14 December 1970	55°58′32″N 3°10′27″W	Incorporating Former Manse, Remains of St Ninian's Church, Tenement, Granary and Mill	27395	Upload Photo
Hermitage of Braid	Off Braid Road	14 July 1966	55°55′12″N 3°12′03″W		27407	Upload another image See more images
Ingliston House	Ingliston	22 January 1971	55°56′25″N 3°22′18″W	Headquarters of the Royal Highland and Agricultural Society of Scotland	27436	Upload Photo
Shieldaig	24 Hermitage Drive	14 December 1970	55°55′14″N 3°12′05″W		27440	Upload Photo
Cathedral Church of St. Mary (Episcopal)	Palmerston Place	14 December 1970	55°56′54″N 3°13′00″W		27441	Upload another image See more images
The Vaults	Leith	14 December 1970	55°58′26″N 3°10′21″W	Occupied by the Scotch Malt Whisky Society	27446	Upload Photo
Walpole Hall and Song School, St Mary's Cathedral	Chester Street and Palmerston Place	14 December 1970	55°56′57″N 3°13′01″W		27448	Upload another image
Stables and Gardener's House, Ingliston House	Ingliston	8 March 1994	55°56′28″N 3°22′11″W		27451	Upload Photo
Kirkliston Parish Church	High Street, Kirkliston	22 February 1971	55°57′16″N 3°24′12″W		27457	Upload another image See more images
South Leith Parish Church	1 and 2 Kirkgate	14 December 1970	55°58′19″N 3°10′14″W		27466	Upload another image See more images
St Michael and All Saints Church (Episcopal)	28 Brougham Street	14 December 1970	55°56′36″N 3°12′05″W		27489	Upload another image See more images
St Peter's Church (Episcopal)	16 Lutton Place, Newington	14 December 1970	55°56′24″N 3°10′44″W		27514	Upload another image See more images
Newliston House	Kirkliston	22 February 1971	55°56′48″N 3°25′31″W		27578	Upload another image
Coach House and Stables and Home Farm, Newliston House	Kirkliston	22 February 1971	55°56′43″N 3°25′31″W		27588	Upload Photo
Drumsheugh Baths	5 Belford Road, Hawthornbank Lane	14 December 1970	55°57′08″N 3°12′59″W		27621	Upload another image
Ratho Hall		22 January 1971	55°55′27″N 3°23′09″W		27647	Upload Photo
Pilrig Dalmeny Church (Church of Scotland)	Leith Walk	12 December 1974	55°57′50″N 3°10′41″W		27649	Upload another image See more images
King's Theatre	2 Leven Street	14 December 1970	55°56′31″N 3°12′10″W		27656	Upload another image See more images
Ratho Park	Ratho	22 January 1971	55°55′24″N 3°21′41″W		27661	Upload another image
Ratho Kirk (St Mary's Church)	Baird Road, Ratho	22 January 1971	55°55′28″N 3°22′49″W		27685	Upload another image See more images
Craig House	Craiglockart Hill	28 August 1979	55°55′17″N 3°13′36″W		27736	Upload another image
Royal Observatory	Blackford Hill	14 December 1970	55°55′23″N 3°11′16″W		27740	Upload another image See more images
Surgeon's Hall	Nicolson Street	14 December 1970	55°56′48″N 3°11′06″W		27772	Upload another image See more images
Almond Aqueduct	West of Ratho	22 February 1971	55°55′13″N 3°26′02″W		27793	Upload another image See more images
Trinity House	99 New Kirkgate	14 December 1970	55°58′20″N 3°10′17″W		27834	Upload another image See more images
Pilrig House	30 Pilrig House Close	14 July 1966	55°58′10″N 3°10′53″W		27841	Upload another image See more images
William Gladstone Memorial	Coates Crescent and Shandwick Place	14 December 1970	55°56′55″N 3°12′44″W		27856	Upload another image See more images
Leith Police Station	29-41 Queen Charlotte Street	14 December 1970	55°58′25″N 3°10′03″W	Former Town Hall	27857	Upload another image See more images
2nd Viscount Melville Monument	Melville Crescent	14 December 1970	55°56′59″N 3°12′50″W		27866	Upload another image
Leith Signal Tower	1 and 2 Shore and 2 Tower Street	14 December 1970	55°58′39″N 3°10′08″W		27884	Upload another image See more images
36 and 37 Shore and 59-61 Bernard Street		14 December 1970	55°58′34″N 3°10′10″W		27890	Upload Photo
St Bernard's Well	Off St Bernard's Bridge	14 December 1970	55°57′19″N 3°12′41″W		27905	Upload another image See more images
Large Palm House	Botanical Gardens	14 December 1970	55°58′01″N 3°12′30″W		27914	Upload another image See more images
Lamb's House	19 Water Street	14 December 1970	55°58′31″N 3°10′11″W		27915	Upload another image See more images
Memorial to Sir Charles Linnaeus	Botanical Gardens	14 December 1970	55°58′01″N 3°12′27″W		27916	Upload another image See more images
Dean Cemetery	Dean Path, Queensferry Road	15 June 1965	55°57′03″N 3°13′22″W		27924	Upload another image See more images
Warriston Cemetery	Warriston Road	16 July 1992	55°58′05″N 3°11′53″W		27937	Upload another image See more images
Cramond Old Bridge	Brae Park Road	14 December 1970	55°57′55″N 3°18′58″W		27940	Upload another image See more images
Dean Bridge	Queensferry Road	15 June 1965	55°57′11″N 3°12′52″W		27941	Upload another image See more images
Stewart's Melville College (Former Daniel Stewart's College)	3 Queensferry Road	15 June 1965	55°57′17″N 3°13′36″W	Includes Art Room, North Gatelodge, Boundary Walls and Gates	27967	Upload another image See more images
Dean Gallery (Former Dean Orphanage)	73 Belford Road	15 June 1965	55°57′07″N 3°13′27″W		27969	Upload another image See more images
Donaldson's Hospital (School For The Deaf)	1B West Coates	25 February 1965	55°56′50″N 3°13′33″W	Includes Chapel, Fountain, Steps and Balustrades to Terraces, Pavilions, Boundary Wall, Piers, Railings, Gatepiers, Gates, East Lodge (1C West Coates) & West Lodge (1A West Coates)	27971	Upload another image See more images
Edinburgh Academy	48 Henderson Row	14 December 1970	55°57′39″N 3°12′16″W		27973	Upload another image See more images
Fettes College	Carrington Road	27 October 1965	55°57′50″N 3°13′35″W		27975	Upload another image See more images
Scottish National Gallery of Modern Art	75 Belford Road	15 June 1965	55°57′04″N 3°13′31″W	Former John Watson's School, including N and S Gate Lodges, Piers and Gates	27982	Upload another image See more images
New Building, University of Edinburgh	22-23 Teviot Place	14 July 1966	55°56′41″N 3°11′26″W		27992	Upload another image
McEwan Hall	15 Bristo Square	14 July 1966	55°56′43″N 3°11′23″W		27993	Upload another image See more images
Reid School of Music, University of Edinburgh	Teviot Row	14 July 1966	55°56′42″N 3°11′21″W		27995	Upload another image See more images
Lauriston Castle	Cramond Road South	14 July 1966	55°58′16″N 3°16′43″W		28019	Upload another image See more images
Liberton Tower	Liberton Drive	14 July 1966	55°54′52″N 3°10′39″W		28021	Upload another image See more images
Beechwood House (Murrayfield Hospital)	122 Corstorphine Road	14 July 1966	55°56′38″N 3°15′52″W		28031	Upload another image
Belmont House	Belmont Drive	14 July 1966	55°56′50″N 3°15′07″W		28032	Upload Photo
Bonaly Tower	65 Bonaly Road	14 December 1970	55°53′51″N 3°15′34″W		28033	Upload another image
Brunstane House	31, 33 Brunstane Road South	14 December 1970	55°56′24″N 3°05′38″W		28034	Upload Photo
Caroline Park House and Royston House	5 Caroline Park	14 July 1966	55°58′54″N 3°14′28″W		28040	Upload Photo
Merchiston Castle School	Colinton Road	14 July 1966	55°54′43″N 3°15′20″W		28042	Upload another image See more images
Old Craig House	Craiglockart Hill	14 December 1970	55°55′22″N 3°13′35″W		28046	Upload another image See more images
The Drum with Sundial	Gilmerton	14 July 1966	55°54′31″N 3°07′13″W		28052	Upload Photo
Drylaw House	Off Groathill Road North	27 October 1965	55°57′52″N 3°15′11″W		28060	Upload Photo
Duddingston House		14 July 1966	55°56′21″N 3°08′13″W		28065	Upload another image See more images
Duddingston House Temple	Duddingston Golf Course	14 July 1966	55°56′33″N 3°08′11″W		28068	Upload Photo
Easter Coates House	32 Manor Place	14 December 1970	55°56′56″N 3°13′00″W	Formerly Old Coates House	28070	Upload another image
Inch House	Glenallan Drive, Old Dalkeith Road, and Gilmerton Road	14 July 1966	55°55′30″N 3°09′32″W		28078	Upload another image See more images
Former Kingston Clinic	80-84 Kingston Avenue	12 December 1974	55°55′10″N 3°09′04″W		28082	Upload Photo
Liberton House	Liberton Drive	14 July 1966	55°54′41″N 3°10′22″W		28086	Upload another image See more images
Marionville	232 Marionville Road	14 December 1970	55°57′32″N 3°09′15″W		28089	Upload Photo
Morton House	19 Winton Loan	14 July 1966	55°53′50″N 3°11′38″W		28092	Upload Photo
Morton House Belvedere	19 Winton Loan	14 July 1966	55°53′46″N 3°11′34″W		28094	Upload Photo
Mortonhall House	47 and 49 Mortonhall Gate	14 July 1966	55°54′10″N 3°10′55″W		28096	Upload another image See more images
Muirhouse	36 Marine Drive	14 July 1966	55°58′42″N 3°15′57″W		28099	Upload Photo
Murrayfield House	66 Murrayfield Avenue	14 July 1966	55°56′57″N 3°14′25″W		28100	Upload another image
Peffermill House	Peffermill Road	14 July 1966	55°55′57″N 3°08′56″W		28106	Upload Photo
Prestonfield House Hotel	71 Priestfield Road	14 July 1966	55°56′12″N 3°09′26″W		28107	Upload another image See more images
Former Stables, Prestonfield House	71 Priestfield Road	14 July 1966	55°56′14″N 3°09′31″W		28108	Upload Photo
Ravelston House, Mary Erskine School	Ravelston Dykes Road	14 July 1966	55°57′10″N 3°15′15″W		28110	Upload another image
Ravelston Tower (Old Ravelston House)	Ravelston Dykes Road	14 July 1966	55°57′08″N 3°15′22″W		28113	Upload Photo
Roseburn House	68 Roseburn Street	14 July 1966	55°56′35″N 3°14′13″W		28120	Upload Photo
Stenhouse Mill (House)	Stenhouse Mill Lane and Crescent	14 December 1970	55°55′46″N 3°15′20″W		28125	Upload another image See more images
Dovecot	2 Dovecot Road, Corstorphine	14 December 1970	55°56′20″N 3°16′53″W		28135	Upload another image See more images
Inch Dovecot	Gilmerton Road	14 July 1966	55°55′23″N 3°09′52″W		28140	Upload another image
Liberton House Dovecot	Liberton Drive	14 July 1966	55°54′43″N 3°10′19″W		28141	Upload Photo
Redhall House Dovecote	Craiglockhart Drive South	14 July 1966	55°55′11″N 3°14′56″W		28145	Upload another image
Former Bell's Mills Granary	Belford Road	15 June 1965	55°57′01″N 3°13′20″W		28149	Upload Photo
1, 3 Alva Street, 12,13,14 Queensferry Street		14 December 1970	55°57′02″N 3°12′35″W		28235	Upload Photo
5-25 Alva Street		14 December 1970	55°57′02″N 3°12′36″W		28236	Upload Photo
27, 29, 31 Alva Street		14 December 1970	55°56′59″N 3°12′39″W		28237	Upload Photo
2, 4 Alva Street, 15, 17 Queensferry Street		14 December 1970	55°57′03″N 3°12′36″W		28238	Upload Photo
6-26 Alva Street		14 December 1970	55°57′02″N 3°12′37″W		28239	Upload Photo
28, 30, 32 Alva Street		14 December 1970	55°57′01″N 3°12′40″W		28240	Upload another image
3-13 Ann Street		25 February 1965	55°57′24″N 3°12′50″W		28241	Upload another image
15-41 Ann Street		25 February 1965	55°57′22″N 3°12′48″W		28242	Upload Photo
43 Ann Street		25 February 1965	55°57′21″N 3°12′46″W		28243	Upload Photo
45, 47 Ann Street		25 February 1965	55°57′21″N 3°12′45″W		28244	Upload another image
4-14 Ann Street		25 February 1965	55°57′25″N 3°12′48″W		28246	Upload Photo
16-42 Ann Street		25 February 1965	55°57′23″N 3°12′45″W		28247	Upload another image
44 Ann Street		25 February 1965	55°57′22″N 3°12′44″W		28248	Upload Photo
46, 48 Ann Street		25 February 1965	55°57′22″N 3°12′44″W		28249	Upload Photo
1-22 Atholl Crescent		14 December 1970	55°56′52″N 3°12′42″W		28260	Upload another image
1-13 Atholl Place		14 December 1970	55°56′51″N 3°12′50″W		28261	Upload Photo
1-8 Baxter's Place		14 December 1970	55°57′27″N 3°11′04″W		28279	Upload another image
1-3 Bellevue Terrace		25 November 1965	55°57′41″N 3°11′35″W		28291	Upload Photo
4-11A Bellevue Terrace		25 November 1965	55°57′41″N 3°11′36″W		28292	Upload Photo
13, 15 Bell's Brae		14 December 1970	55°57′08″N 3°12′58″W	Formerly Old Tollbooth or Cathedral Mission	28293	Upload another image
23 and 25 Blacket Place		14 December 1970	55°56′08″N 3°10′24″W		28306	Upload Photo
Boswall House	19 Boswall Road	14 December 1970	55°58′47″N 3°12′41″W		28338	Upload Photo
7-17A Brunswick Street		21 April 1966	55°57′32″N 3°10′47″W		28371	Upload another image
17-19 Buccleuch Place		14 December 1970	55°56′33″N 3°11′14″W		28387	Upload another image
3-13 Carlton Street		12 August 1965	55°57′26″N 3°12′38″W		28457	Upload Photo
4-16 Carlton Street		12 August 1965	55°57′25″N 3°12′39″W		28459	Upload Photo
7-21 Claremont Crescent		25 November 1965	55°57′50″N 3°11′30″W		28524	Upload Photo
1-41 East Claremont Street		25 November 1965	55°57′41″N 3°11′35″W		28533	Upload Photo
43-49 East Claremont Street		25 November 1965	55°57′44″N 3°11′33″W		28534	Upload Photo
1-22 Clarendon Crescent and 1, 1A Oxford Terrace		15 June 1965	55°57′15″N 3°12′52″W		28544	Upload Photo
1-11 Coates Crescent		14 December 1970	55°56′57″N 3°12′41″W		28563	Upload another image
12-22 Coates Crescent		14 December 1970	55°56′55″N 3°12′47″W		28564	Upload another image
1, 2, 3, Riverside and 10,11,12,13,14 and 15 Cramond Village		14 December 1970	55°58′48″N 3°18′02″W		28606	Upload Photo
St Leonard's Hall	18 Holyrood Park Road	12 December 1974	55°56′24″N 3°10′16″W		28619	Upload another image See more images
Salisbury Green	Dalkeith Road	14 December 1970	55°56′17″N 3°10′17″W		28620	Upload another image See more images
Arthur Lodge	60 Dalkeith Road	14 December 1970	55°56′17″N 3°10′23″W		28622	Upload Photo
3-23 Danube Street		12 August 1965	55°57′25″N 3°12′43″W		28630	Upload another image
4-34A Danube Street		12 August 1965	55°57′23″N 3°12′43″W		28631	Upload another image
2-6A Dean Terrace		27 October 1965	55°57′28″N 3°12′34″W		28642	Upload Photo
11-15A Dean Terrace		27 October 1965	55°57′27″N 3°12′37″W		28644	Upload Photo
16-21 Dean Terrace		27 October 1965	55°57′24″N 3°12′41″W		28645	Upload another image
1A Upper Dean Terrace		27 October 1965	55°57′23″N 3°12′42″W		28646	Upload Photo
1-6 Upper Dean Terrace		27 October 1965	55°57′22″N 3°12′42″W		28647	Upload another image
Deanhaugh Street 2-10		27 October 1965	55°57′29″N 3°12′34″W		28650	Upload Photo
Deanhaugh Street 12-36		27 October 1965	55°57′30″N 3°12′35″W		28651	Upload Photo
1-23 Elm Row		16 December 1965	55°57′30″N 3°11′01″W		28734	Upload another image
1-13 Eton Terrace		12 August 1965	55°57′15″N 3°12′51″W		28737	Upload Photo
14 Eton Terrace		12 August 1965	55°57′19″N 3°12′48″W		28738	Upload Photo
158-164 Fountainbridge		14 December 1970	55°56′34″N 3°12′40″W		28778	Upload Photo
1-25A Gardner's Crescent		14 December 1970	55°56′45″N 3°12′38″W		28797	Upload another image
16 and 17 George Square		14 December 1970	55°56′38″N 3°11′27″W		28809	Upload another image
18 George Square		14 December 1970	55°56′38″N 3°11′26″W		28810	Upload another image
21 George Square		14 December 1970	55°56′37″N 3°11′26″W		28813	Upload another image
22 George Square		14 December 1970	55°56′37″N 3°11′26″W		28814	Upload another image
23A and 23B George Square		14 December 1970	55°56′36″N 3°11′26″W		28815	Upload another image
23 George Square		14 December 1970	55°56′36″N 3°11′26″W		28816	Upload another image
24 George Square		14 December 1970	55°56′36″N 3°11′26″W		28817	Upload another image
25 George Square		14 December 1970	55°56′35″N 3°11′25″W		28818	Upload another image
26 George Square		14 December 1970	55°56′35″N 3°11′25″W		28819	Upload another image
27 George Square		14 December 1970	55°56′35″N 3°11′25″W		28820	Upload another image
28 George Square		14 December 1970	55°56′34″N 3°11′25″W		28821	Upload Photo
29 George Square		14 December 1970	55°56′34″N 3°11′25″W		28822	Upload another image
55 George Square		14 December 1970	55°56′38″N 3°11′14″W		28823	Upload another image
56 George Square		14 December 1970	55°56′39″N 3°11′14″W		28824	Upload Photo
57 and 58 George Square		14 December 1970	55°56′39″N 3°11′14″W		28825	Upload another image
59 George Square		14 December 1970	55°56′39″N 3°11′14″W		28826	Upload another image
60 George Square		14 December 1970	55°56′40″N 3°11′15″W		28827	Upload another image
1-8 Haddington Place		19 April 1966	55°57′34″N 3°11′02″W		28983	Upload another image
17A-27A Haddington Place		19 April 1966	55°57′37″N 3°10′58″W		28984	Upload another image
28-32A Haddington Place		19 April 1966	55°57′38″N 3°10′56″W		28985	Upload another image
1-7A Hillside Crescent		16 December 1965	55°57′29″N 3°10′51″W		29084	Upload another image
11 Hillside Crescent		29 November 1988	55°57′30″N 3°10′44″W		29085	Upload Photo
7,7A, 8 and 8A Hopetoun Crescent		25 November 1965	55°57′41″N 3°11′05″W		29098	Upload Photo
17 and 18 Hopetoun Crescent		25 November 1965	55°57′43″N 3°11′00″W		29099	Upload Photo
5-32 Howard Place		25 November 1965	55°57′50″N 3°12′05″W		29103	Upload Photo
5 and 6 Inverleith Row		27 October 1965	55°57′53″N 3°12′11″W		29155	Upload Photo
8 Inverleith Row		27 October 1965	55°57′54″N 3°12′13″W		29157	Upload Photo
1 and 2 Laverockbank Road		14 December 1970	55°58′37″N 3°12′02″W		29220	Upload Photo
4, 5, 6 Melville Crescent, 43 Melville Street, 19 Walker Street		14 December 1970	55°57′00″N 3°11′36″W		29230	Upload another image
Learmonth House	25 Learmonth Terrace	14 December 1970	55°57′20″N 3°13′15″W		29248	Upload another image
1-11 Leopold Place		16 December 1965	55°57′29″N 3°11′02″W		29257	Upload another image
12-21 Leopold Place		16 December 1965	55°57′29″N 3°10′53″W		29258	Upload Photo
3-22 Lynedoch Place		14 December 1970	55°57′06″N 3°12′47″W		29275	Upload another image
3-17 Manor Place		14 December 1970	55°56′53″N 3°12′51″W		29296	Upload Photo
19-29 Manor Place		14 December 1970	55°56′55″N 3°12′53″W		29297	Upload Photo
35-47 Manor Place		14 December 1970	55°56′57″N 3°12′56″W		29298	Upload another image
1, 2, 3 Melville Crescent		14 December 1970	55°56′59″N 3°12′53″W		29319	Upload another image
4-6 Melville Crescent		14 December 1970	55°57′00″N 3°12′49″W		29320	Upload Photo
7, 8, 9 Melville Crescent		14 December 1970	55°56′58″N 3°12′48″W		29321	Upload another image
10, 11, 12 Melville Crescent		14 December 1970	55°56′57″N 3°12′50″W		29322	Upload Photo
1-41 Melville Street		14 December 1970	55°57′04″N 3°12′41″W		29324	Upload another image
47-61 Melville Street		14 December 1970	55°56′56″N 3°12′53″W		29325	Upload another image
2-24 Melville Street		14 December 1970	55°57′02″N 3°12′41″W		29326	Upload another image
28-40 Melville Street		14 December 1970	55°57′00″N 3°12′46″W		29327	Upload another image
46-60 Melville Street		14 December 1970	55°56′57″N 3°12′52″W		29328	Upload another image
2-12 Middleby Street		14 December 1970	55°56′04″N 3°10′32″W		29334	Upload another image
1-3 Middlefield and 15 Spey Street		25 April 1965	55°57′48″N 3°10′46″W		29335	Upload Photo
2-12 Oxford Terrace		12 August 1965	55°57′20″N 3°12′57″W		29471	Upload Photo
Stonehouse	1 Pentland Road	14 December 1978	55°54′32″N 3°15′51″W		29486	Upload Photo
1 Pilrig Place and 2-6 Pilrig Street		25 November 1965	55°57′49″N 3°10′43″W		29493	Upload Photo
Waldorf Astoria Edinburgh - The Caledonian	4 Lothian Road	20 February 1985	55°56′58″N 3°12′26″W	including piers, railings and former screen entrance to Station	29524	Upload another image See more images
Dean Park House (Stewart's Melville Boarding House)	7 Queensferry Road	14 December 1970	55°57′16″N 3°13′46″W	Including Former Coach House	29575	Upload Photo
2-9A Randolph Cliff		14 December 1970	55°57′08″N 3°12′47″W		29599	Upload another image
Melvin House	3 Rothesay Terrace	14 December 1970	55°57′05″N 3°13′00″W		29668	Upload another image
Rutland Hotel and Bar	1 Rutland Place	14 December 1970	55°57′00″N 3°12′28″W		29685	Upload Photo
1 Rutland Square		14 December 1970	55°56′56″N 3°12′30″W		29686	Upload another image
2-4 Rutland Square		14 December 1970	55°56′56″N 3°12′30″W		29687	Upload another image
5-11 Rutland Square		14 December 1970	55°56′55″N 3°12′31″W		29688	Upload another image
12-22 Rutland Square		14 December 1970	55°56′54″N 3°12′35″W		29689	Upload another image
23-29 Rutland Square		14 December 1970	55°56′56″N 3°12′35″W		29690	Upload another image
30 and 31 Rutland Square		14 December 1970	55°56′57″N 3°12′33″W		29691	Upload Photo
32 Rutland Square		14 December 1970	55°56′57″N 3°12′32″W		29692	Upload another image
3-35 St Bernard's Crescent		27 October 1965	55°57′28″N 3°12′41″W		29712	Upload another image
2 St Bernard's Crescent		27 October 1965	55°57′26″N 3°12′41″W		29713	Upload Photo
4-10A St Bernard's Crescent		27 October 1965	55°57′26″N 3°12′43″W		29714	Upload another image
14 St Bernard's Crescent		27 October 1965	55°57′26″N 3°12′46″W		29716	Upload Photo
1-15 Saxe Coburg Place		14 December 1970	55°57′36″N 3°12′30″W		29763	Upload Photo
23-32 Saxe Coburg Place		14 December 1970	55°57′39″N 3°12′32″W		29766	Upload Photo
Sir William Fraser Homes	52 Spylaw Bank Road	14 December 1970	55°54′33″N 3°15′48″W		29821	Upload Photo
3, 5, 7, 9 Walker Street		14 December 1970	55°56′56″N 3°12′45″W		29878	Upload Photo
11, 13, 15 Walker Street		14 December 1970	55°56′58″N 3°12′47″W		29879	Upload another image
21, 23, 25, 27 Walker Street		14 December 1970	55°57′01″N 3°12′52″W		29880	Upload Photo
4, 6, 8, 10 Walker Street		14 December 1970	55°56′55″N 3°12′47″W		29881	Upload Photo
12, 14, 16 Walker Street		14 December 1970	55°56′57″N 3°12′49″W		29882	Upload Photo
22, 24, 26, 28 Walker Street		14 December 1970	55°57′00″N 3°12′54″W		29883	Upload Photo
1-4 Warriston Crescent		25 November 1965	55°57′48″N 3°12′01″W		29893	Upload Photo
5-33 Warriston Crescent		25 November 1965	55°57′50″N 3°12′00″W		29894	Upload Photo
1-54 Well Court	Dean Path and Damside	15 June 1965	55°57′08″N 3°13′04″W	Including Woodbarn Hall and Clock Tower	29900	Upload another image
5-29 Windsor Street		16 December 1965	55°57′29″N 3°10′55″W		29942	Upload Photo
6-26 Windsor Street		16 December 1965	55°57′30″N 3°10′57″W		29944	Upload Photo
Allermuir	15 Woodhall Road	14 December 1970	55°54′23″N 3°15′28″W		29948	Upload Photo
Grange House	22 York Road	14 December 1970	55°58′40″N 3°12′11″W		29997	Upload Photo
Gothic House	24 York Road	14 December 1970	55°58′41″N 3°12′10″W		29998	Upload Photo
Reid Memorial Church	West Savile Terrace and Blackford Avenue	12 December 1974	55°55′35″N 3°11′03″W		30015	Upload another image See more images
Former Odeon Cinema (New Victoria Cinema)	7 Clerk Street	12 December 1974	55°56′33″N 3°11′00″W		30028	Upload another image See more images
Statue of George II	Royal Infirmary Forecourt, 1 Lauriston Place	12 December 1974	55°56′41″N 3°11′35″W		30033	Upload Photo
Gothic Cottage	24 Russell Place	12 December 1974	55°58′42″N 3°12′19″W		30157	Upload Photo
Mid Pier	Granton Harbour	28 November 1989	55°59′10″N 3°13′18″W	Including Slipways, Wharves and Lamp Standards	30216	Upload Photo
HMSO Store, Sighthill	11 Bankhead Broadway, Sighthill Industrial Estate	29 November 1990	55°55′27″N 3°17′46″W		30250	Upload another image
Balnagowan	13-17 Murrayfield Drive	29 November 1990	55°56′50″N 3°14′41″W		30251	Upload another image
1-48 Ravelston Garden		17 May 1991	55°57′07″N 3°14′51″W		30264	Upload Photo
99 Dalkeith Road, Marchhall Place and Marchhall Crescent		24 September 1991	55°56′11″N 3°10′11″W	Including 2 Marchhall Place and Priestfield Parish Church	30267	Upload another image See more images
Former Edinburgh Royal Infirmary, Main Block	Lauriston Place	31 May 1994	55°56′40″N 3°11′34″W	Including Linked Original Ward Pavilions	30306	Upload another image See more images
Grange Park House, Formerly Egremont	38 Dick Place	14 December 1970	55°55′57″N 3°11′22″W		30365	Upload Photo
46A Dick Place		29 April 1988	55°55′57″N 3°11′23″W		30367	Upload Photo
48 and 50 Dick Place		14 December 1970	55°55′58″N 3°11′26″W		30368	Upload another image
1-12 Bruntsfield Crescent	Bruntsfield	15 April 1991	55°56′10″N 3°12′11″W		30498	Upload Photo
East Morningside House	3 and 5 Clinton Road	14 December 1970	55°55′58″N 3°12′11″W	including Dovecot, Gatepiers, Garden and Boundary Walls	30499	Upload Photo
Avallon	2 & 2A Clinton Road	12 December 1974	55°55′55″N 3°12′05″W	including Lodge	30501	Upload Photo
Roman Catholic Archiepiscopal Chapel	42 Greenhill Gardens	14 December 1970	55°55′57″N 3°12′17″W		30521	Upload Photo
James Gillespie's High School, Bruntsfield House	Marchmont	14 July 1966	55°56′12″N 3°11′58″W		30530	Upload Photo
31 Mortonhall Road		14 December 1970	55°55′38″N 3°11′39″W		30577	Upload Photo
33 Mortonhall Road		14 December 1970	55°55′38″N 3°11′40″W		30578	Upload Photo
35 Mortonhall Road		14 December 1970	55°55′38″N 3°11′41″W		30579	Upload Photo
14 Oswald Road		14 December 1970	55°55′38″N 3°11′38″W		30589	Upload another image
Gillis College RC Chapel	Whitehouse Loan	14 December 1970	55°56′05″N 3°12′02″W		30664	Upload another image See more images
Forth Bridge		18 June 1973	55°59′54″N 3°23′15″W		40370	Upload another image See more images
Black Castle	High Street, South Queensferry	22 February 1971	55°59′23″N 3°23′42″W		40386	Upload another image
Plewlands House	Hopetoun Road, South Queensferry	22 February 1971	55°59′26″N 3°23′52″W		40389	Upload another image
The Priory Church of St. Mary of Mount Carmel	Hopetoun Road, South Queensferry	22 February 1971	55°59′27″N 3°23′54″W		40391	Upload another image See more images
Tolbooth	West Terrace, South Queensferry	22 February 1971	55°59′25″N 3°23′49″W		40411	Upload another image See more images
Royal Commonwealth Pool	Dalkeith Road	29 March 1996	55°56′21″N 3°10′22″W		43148	Upload another image See more images
Mortonhall Crematorium	Howdenhall Road	15 April 1996	55°54′09″N 3°10′13″W		43242	Upload another image See more images
Craigiehall		22 February 1971	55°57′52″N 3°20′11″W		45432	Upload another image See more images
Craigiehall, Walled Garden, including Gatepiers		26 March 1998	55°57′55″N 3°20′09″W		45433	Upload Photo
Dundas Castle Keep	near South Queensferry	22 February 1971	55°58′31″N 3°24′54″W		45474	Upload another image See more images
22 Claremont Crescent		25 November 1965	55°57′51″N 3°11′27″W		45936	Upload Photo
51-77 East Claremont Street		25 November 1965	55°57′44″N 3°11′32″W		45940	Upload Photo
79-85 East Claremont Street		25 November 1965	55°57′46″N 3°11′31″W		45941	Upload Photo
19 George Square		14 December 1970	55°56′37″N 3°11′26″W		47583	Upload another image
20 George Square		14 December 1970	55°56′37″N 3°11′26″W		47584	Upload another image
Forth Road Bridge with Approach Ramps and Piers		21 March 2001	56°00′06″N 3°24′15″W		47778	Upload another image See more images
Robin Chapel	Thistle Foundation Estate, Niddrie	14 June 2002	55°55′53″N 3°07′50″W		48686	Upload another image See more images
Craigsbank Parish Church (Church of Scotland)	Craigs Bank	13 November 2002	55°56′37″N 3°17′49″W	With hall, including former church	48977	Upload another image See more images
11-17 Annandale Street		19 April 1966	55°57′35″N 3°11′03″W		49144	Upload Photo
Royal Botanic Garden, 1967 Greenhouse	Inverleith	4 June 2003	55°57′59″N 3°12′29″W		49216	Upload another image See more images
25 Bridge Road		19 November 2003	55°54′26″N 3°15′33″W		49552	Upload Photo
Laverockdale House	Dreghorn Loan	14 July 1966	55°54′09″N 3°15′05″W		49562	Upload Photo
Fettes College, Sundial	Inverleith	20 January 2004	55°57′50″N 3°13′39″W		49628	Upload another image
4-9 Brunton Place		29 April 1977	55°57′28″N 3°10′29″W		49744	Upload Photo
University of Edinburgh, Pollock Halls of Residence	Holyrood Park Road	17 January 2006	55°56′17″N 3°10′13″W		50187	Upload another image
40 George Square (Block A) and Lecture Block (Block B), University of Edinburgh	George Square	17 January 2006	55°56′36″N 3°11′12″W		50189	Upload another image See more images
University of Edinburgh, Main Library	George Square	17 January 2006	55°56′34″N 3°11′20″W		50191	Upload another image
Scottish Widows Fund and Life Assurance Society Head Office	Dalkeith Road	3 March 2006	55°56′25″N 3°10′28″W		50213	Upload another image See more images

== See also ==
- Scheduled monuments in Edinburgh
