= Scheduled monuments in Edinburgh =

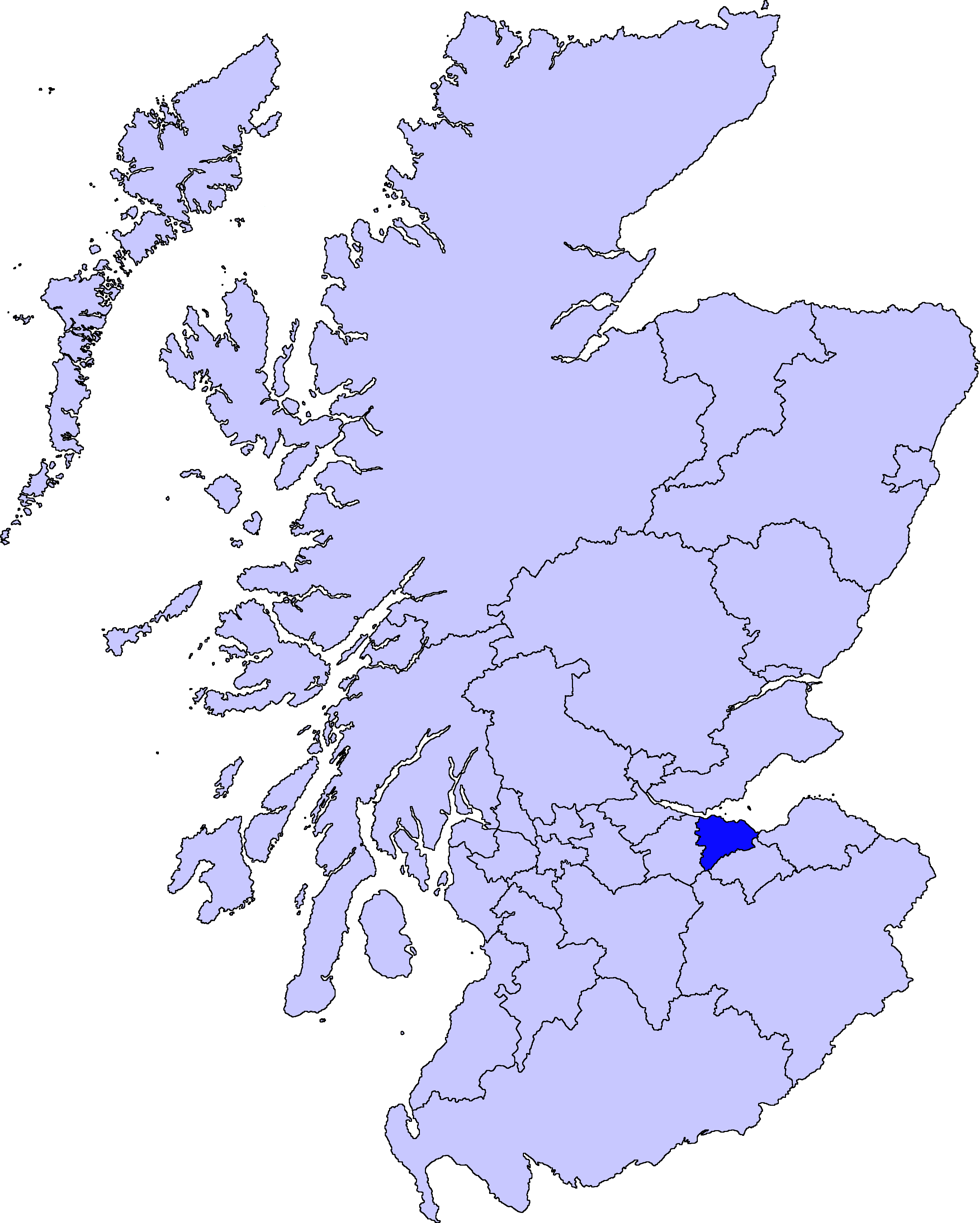
Edinburgh shown within Scotland

A scheduled monument in Scotland is a nationally important archaeological site or monument which is given legal protection by being placed on a list (or "schedule") maintained by Historic Environment Scotland. The aim of scheduling is to preserve the country's most significant sites and monuments as far as possible in the form in which they have been inherited.

The process of scheduling is governed by the Ancient Monuments and Archaeological Areas Act 1979, which aims "to make provision for the investigation, preservation and recording of matters of archaeological or historical interest". The term "scheduled monument" can apply to the whole range of archaeological sites which have been deliberately constructed by human activity but are not always visible above ground. They range from prehistoric standing stones and burial sites, through Roman remains and medieval structures such as castles and monasteries, to later structures such as industrial sites and buildings constructed for the World Wars. Some buildings or structures which were both scheduled and listed have had their listing designations removed to reduce the duplication.

In 2017 there were 8238 scheduled monuments in Scotland.

== Notable Scheduled Monuments in Edinburgh ==
Name	Location	Description	Ref No	Image
Craiglockhart Castle	Edinburgh	Ruined tower-house	SM1198	
Edinburgh Town Wall, Flodden Wall	Edinburgh	Late medieval town walls, dating to circa 1513	SM3012	
Holyrood Abbey	Edinburgh	Remains of abbey and precinct	SM13031	
Holyrood Park	Edinburgh	Enclosed Royal park	SM13032	
Craigmillar Castle	Edinburgh	Roofless L-plan tower-house	SM90129	
Edinburgh Castle	Edinburgh	Edinburgh castle complex	SM90130	

== See also ==
- List of Category A listed buildings in Edinburgh
