= List of Category A listed buildings in the New Town, Edinburgh =

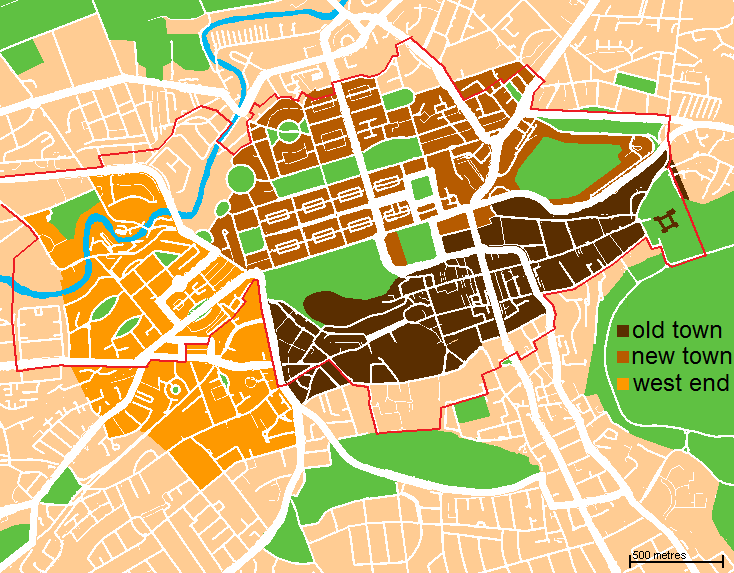
The New Town, shown in light brown

This is a list of Category A listed buildings in the New Town of Edinburgh, Scotland.

For the main list, see List of Category A listed buildings in Edinburgh.

== Boundaries ==
The New Town is defined here as the area shown in light brown on the map to the right, with some small exceptions:

- to the north, a line along St. Stephen Street, Fettes Row, Royal Crescent, and Bellevue Crescent, then along East London Street

This includes Royal Crescent, Scotland Street and Bellevue Crescent, which are omitted from the map area

- to the west, Queensferry Street and Great Stuart Street, through Moray Place up Gloucester Street

All buildings on Randolph Crescent, Ainslie Place, and Moray Place have been included.

- to the east, Annandale Street (south of the East London Street roundabout) to Elm Row/Leith Walk, then along Royal Terrace to where Carlton Terrace Brae meets Regent Road

This encompasses the Gayfield Square area and all of the structures on Calton Hill, as well as the very southern end of Leith Walk. It does not, however, include the buildings around Montgomery Street to the north of London Road

- to the south, the southern edge of Princes Street Gardens, Waverley Station, then along Regent Road

This includes all structures in Princes Street Gardens and the lower parts of the Mound, with a boundary running approximately along Market Street, and includes Waverley Station as well as the Balmoral Hotel and the old Post Office building at the north end of North Bridge. At the west, it includes St Cuthbert's Church, and at the eastern end includes all buildings on Calton Hill to the north of Regent Road, including the old Royal High School.

== Listed buildings ==
| Name | Location | Date listed | Geo-coordinates | Notes | LB number | Image |
|---|---|---|---|---|---|---|
| West Register House | Charlotte Square | 3 March 1966 | 55°57′06″N 3°12′34″W | Former St George's Church. Robert Reid, 1811-1814; gutted and reconstructed as registry office by R Saddler of Ministry of Public Building and Works, 1964-1970. | 27360 | Upload another image See more images |
| 3 George Street (Incorporating Former No 13), Standard Life | | 13 January 1966 | 55°57′15″N 3°11′43″W | J M Dick Peddie & George Washington Browne, 1897-1901, Palladian office block; former No 13 by W Hamilton Beattie (George Beattie & Sons), 1898, French Renaissance office; substantial additions and alterations by Michael Laird & Partners; phase 1, 1964; phase 2, with Robert Matthew, 1968; phase 3, 1975-1978; sculpture and friezes by Sir John Steel and Gerald Ogilvy Laing. | 28829 | Upload another image |
| George Hotel | 19-25 George Street | 12 December 1974 | 55°57′14″N 3°11′48″W | John Young, circa 1780; now classical hotel with many later alterations. David Bryce, 1840-1841; alterations and additions McGibbon and Ross, 1879-1880; alterations R H Watherston, 1903; rear block Henry Wylie, 1968. | 28830 | Upload another image |
| Clydesdale Bank | 29 and 31 George Street | 13 January 1966 | 55°57′14″N 3°11′49″W | David Bryce, 1841-1842 and 1847-1848. | 28831 | Upload another image |
| 45 George Street | | 13 January 1966 | 55°57′13″N 3°11′55″W | Circa 1775; refaced and extra storey added by Thomas Hamilton, 1829; alterations by Covell Matthews Partnership, 1974. | 28836 | Upload another image |
| 69 and 69A George Street | | 13 January 1966 | 55°57′12″N 3°12′01″W | George Washington Browne, 1905. | 28844 | Upload another image |
| 91 and 91A George Street | | 13 January 1966 | 55°57′10″N 3°12′08″W | 1785-1790 with later alterations. | 28847 | Upload another image |
| Bank of Scotland | 97-105 George Street | 13 January 1966 | 55°57′10″N 3°12′10″W | J M Dick Peddie (Kinnear & Peddie), 1883-5. | 28850 | Upload another image |
| 115 George Street | | 13 January 1966 | 55°57′09″N 3°12′16″W | James Nisbet, circa 1790. | 28854 | Upload another image |
| Church of Scotland Offices | 117 to 121 George Street | 13 January 1966 | 55°57′10″N 3°12′17″W | Sydney Mitchell & Wilson, 1909-1911; additional E bay by Auldjo Jamieson & Arnott. | 28855 | Upload another image |
| 125 George Street | | 14 December 1970 | 55°57′09″N 3°12′19″W | Circa 1785; additions to rear Robert Matheson, 1856, and George Morham, 1898. | 28856 | Upload another image |
| Former Commercial Bank | 14 George Street | 13 January 1966 | 55°57′12″N 3°11′44″W | David Rhind, 1846-1847; internal alterations by Sydney Mitchell, 1885. | 28862 | Upload another image |
| Royal Society of Edinburgh | 22 and 24 George Street | 14 December 1970 | 55°57′12″N 3°11′47″W | William Burn and David Bryce, 1843; adapted internally by W T Oldrieve, 1909; lecture theatre to rear by Robert Hurd and Partners, 1982. | 28864 | Upload another image See more images |
| 26 George Street | | 13 January 1966 | 55°57′12″N 3°11′49″W | J M Dick Peddie, 1908-1909. | 28865 | Upload another image |
| 30, 30A and 32 George Street | | 13 January 1966 | 55°57′12″N 3°11′51″W | Circa 1775; alterations by David Bryce, 1860; later shops. | 28866 | Upload another image |
| 56 and 58 George Street | | 13 January 1966 | 55°57′11″N 3°11′57″W | Circa 1775. | 28870 | Upload another image |
| Bank of Scotland | 62-66 George Street | 13 January 1966 | 55°57′10″N 3°11′58″W | David and John Bryce, 1874-1878. | 28873 | Upload another image |
| National Westminster Bank | 78 and 80 George Street | 13 January 1966 | 55°57′09″N 3°12′04″W | J J Burnet, 1903-1907; altered circa 1936; restored by Ian Burke Associates, 1972. | 28876 | Upload another image |
| Northern Lighthouse Board | 84 George Street | 13 January 1966 | 55°57′09″N 3°12′06″W | Built by Claud Cleghorn, 1786-1788; reconstructed and united by Rowand Anderson, Kininmonth & Paul, 1971-1973. | 28877 | Upload another image See more images |
| 112 George Street | | 13 January 1966 | 55°57′08″N 3°12′15″W | 1790. | 28883 | Upload another image |
| Waverley Gate (former General Post Office) | North Bridge | 14 December 1970 | 55°57′11″N 3°11′17″W | Robert Matheson, 1861-1865, with later additions, W W Robertson, 1891-1892 and W T Oldrieve, 1907-1910. | 27631 | Upload another image |
| General Register House | Princes Street | 14 December 1970 | 55°57′13″N 3°11′21″W | Robert Adam, 1774-1788; Robert Reid, 1822-1834. Occupied by the General Register Office for Scotland | 27636 | Upload another image See more images |
| New Register House | West Register Street | 14 December 1970 | 55°57′15″N 3°11′25″W | Robert Matheson, 1856-1862. Occupied by the General Register Office for Scotland | 27641 | Upload another image |
| Governor's House | Calton Hill | 14 December 1970 | 55°57′11″N 3°11′07″W | Archibald Elliot, 1815. | 27646 | Upload another image See more images |
| Royal College of Physicians | 9 and 10 Queen Street | 3 March 1966 | 55°57′18″N 3°11′47″W | Thomas Hamilton, 1843-1845; library block added and hall extended by David Bryce, 1864; New Library by David and John Bryce, 1876-1877; conference centre and lecture theatre to rear by Baron Bercott Associates, 1984 principal rooms refurbished by Ben Tindall, 1994. | 27732 | Upload another image See more images |
| Royal Scottish Academy | 77A Princes Street | 14 December 1970 | 55°57′07″N 3°11′47″W | William Playfair, 1822-1826, extended and enriched 1832-1835, with later alterations and additions including WT Oldrieve, 1911-1912. Sculpture, Sir John Steell, 1844. | 27744 | Upload another image See more images |
| Scottish National Portrait Gallery | Queen Street | 14 December 1970 | 55°57′20″N 3°11′37″W | Robert Rowand Anderson, 1885-1890; sculpture by W Birnie Rhind, C McBride, DW & W Grant Stevenson, John Hutchison and Pittendrigh MacGillivray. | 27764 | Upload another image See more images |
| Melville Monument | St Andrew Square Gardens | 13 January 1966 | 55°57′15″N 3°11′35″W | William Burn, 1820-1823. | 27816 | Upload another image See more images |
| National Monument of Scotland | Calton Hill | 19 April 1966 | 55°57′17″N 3°10′55″W | C.R. Cockerell and W. H. Playfair, designed 1823-1826, built 1826-1829. | 27820 | Upload another image See more images |
| Nelson Monument | Calton Hill | 19 April 1966 | 55°57′15″N 3°10′58″W | Robert Burn, 1807; completed by Thomas Bonnar, 1814-1816. | 27823 | Upload another image See more images |
| Playfair's Monument | Calton Hill | 19 April 1966 | 55°57′17″N 3°10′59″W | William Henry Playfair, 1825-1826. | 27826 | Upload another image See more images |
| Scott Monument | East Princes Street Gardens | 14 December 1970 | 55°57′09″N 3°11′36″W | George Meikle Kemp, 1840-1844. | 27829 | Upload another image See more images |
| Catherine Sinclair Monument | Queen Street | 14 December 1970 | 55°57′11″N 3°12′27″W | David Bryce, 1866-1868. Sculptor John Rhind. | 27832 | Upload another image See more images |
| Dugald Stewart's Monument | Calton Hill | 19 April 1966 | 55°57′16″N 3°11′04″W | William Henry Playfair, 1831. | 27835 | Upload another image See more images |
| Albert Memorial | Charlotte Square | 3 March 1966 | 55°57′06″N 3°12′28″W | David Bryce, 1873; statue by Sir John Steell, 1870-1876. | 27840 | Upload another image See more images |
| Adam Black Monument | East Princes Street Gardens | 14 December 1970 | 55°57′08″N 3°11′40″W | John Hutchison, 1877. | 27842 | Upload another image See more images |
| Statue of Dr Chalmers | George Street | 13 January 1966 | 55°57′09″N 3°12′13″W | Sir John Steell, 1878. | 27847 | Upload another image See more images |
| Statue of George IV | George Street | 13 January 1966 | 55°57′13″N 3°11′50″W | Sir Francis Chantrey, 1831. | 27854 | Upload another image See more images |
| Monument to John, 4th Earl of Hopetoun | St Andrew Square | 13 April 1965 | 55°57′16″N 3°11′30″W | Thomas Campbell, 1824-1829. | 27862 | Upload another image See more images |
| Livingstone Monument | East Princes Street Gardens | 14 December 1970 | 55°57′09″N 3°11′34″W | Amelia R Hill, 1875. | 27864 | Upload another image See more images |
| Allan Ramsay Monument | West Princes Street Gardens | 14 December 1970 | 55°57′06″N 3°11′50″W | Sir John Steell, 1850 and David Bryce, 1865. | 27870 | Upload another image See more images |
| Monument to Duke of Wellington | Princes Street | 13 January 1966 | 55°57′13″N 3°11′21″W | David Bryce and James Gowans, 1849-1852; equestrian statue by Sir John Steell, 1848. | 27879 | Upload another image See more images |
| John Wilson Monument | East Princes Street Gardens | 14 December 1970 | 55°57′07″N 3°11′42″W | Sir John Steell, 1863-1865. Plinth by David Bryce. | 27881 | Upload another image See more images |
| Ross Fountain | West Princes Street Gardens | 14 December 1970 | 55°57′00″N 3°12′11″W | Jean-Baptiste Klagmann, sculptor, cast by Antoine Durenne, 1862. | 27911 | Upload another image See more images |
| Old Royal High School | Calton Hill | 19 April 1966 | 55°57′12″N 3°10′52″W | Thomas Hamilton, 1825-1829. Including Lodge, Classroom Block, Retaining/ Boundary Walls, Gateposts and Railings | 27987 | Upload another image See more images |
| 3, 3B Albany Street | | 24 May 1966 | 55°57′24″N 3°11′34″W | Earlier 19th century. | 28218 | Upload another image |
| 5-7B Albany Street | | 24 May 1966 | 55°57′25″N 3°11′33″W | Earlier 19th century. | 28219 | Upload another image |
| 9, 9A, 9B Albany Street | | 24 May 1966 | 55°57′24″N 3°11′33″W | Earlier 19th century. | 28220 | Upload another image |
| 11-19 Albany Street | | 24 May 1966 | 55°57′25″N 3°11′31″W | Earlier 19th century. | 28221 | Upload another image |
| 21-23A Albany Street | | 24 May 1966 | 55°57′25″N 3°11′29″W | Earlier 19th century. | 28222 | Upload another image |
| 25, 25B Albany Street | | 24 May 1966 | 55°57′25″N 3°11′29″W | Earlier 19th century. | 28223 | Upload another image |
| 27-33 Albany Street | | 24 May 1966 | 55°57′26″N 3°11′27″W | Earlier 19th century. | 28224 | Upload another image |
| 39-43 Albany Street | | 24 May 1966 | 55°57′26″N 3°11′23″W | Probably William Sibbald, earlier 19th century. | 28226 | Upload another image |
| 8-16 Albany Street | | 13 September 1964 | 55°57′26″N 3°11′35″W | Earlier 19th century. | 28229 | Upload another image |
| 18-40 Albany Street | | 13 September 1964 | 55°57′26″N 3°11′31″W | Probably William Sibbald, earlier 19th century. | 28230 | Upload another image |
| 42-44 Albany Street | | 13 September 1964 | 55°57′27″N 3°11′26″W | Earlier 19th century. | 28231 | Upload another image |
| 1 and 2 Royal Terrace | | 14 December 1970 | 55°57′24″N 3°10′40″W | William Playfair, designed 1820-1824; No 1 and No 2 built circa 1857. | 29681 | Upload another image |
| 3 Royal Terrace | | 14 December 1970 | 55°57′24″N 3°10′51″W | William Playfair, designed 1820-1824. No 3 built circa 1859. | 49801 | Upload another image |
| 4 Royal Terrace | | 14 December 1970 | 55°57′24″N 3°10′50″W | William Playfair, designed 1820-1824. No 4 built between 1823 and early 1830s. | 49802 | Upload another image |
| 5 Royal Terrace | | 14 December 1970 | 55°57′24″N 3°10′50″W | William Playfair, designed 1820-1824. No 5 built between 1823 and early 1830s. | 49803 | Upload another image |
| 6 Royal Terrace | | 14 December 1970 | 55°57′24″N 3°10′49″W | William Playfair, designed 1820-1824. No 6 built between 1823 and early 1830s. | 49804 | Upload another image |
| 7 Royal Terrace | | 14 December 1970 | 55°57′24″N 3°10′49″W | William Playfair, designed 1820-1824. No 7 built between 1823 and early 1830s. | 49805 | Upload another image |
| 8 Royal Terrace | | 14 December 1970 | 55°57′24″N 3°10′48″W | William Playfair, designed 1820-1824. No 8 built between 1823 and early 1830s. | 49806 | Upload another image |
| 9 Royal Terrace | | 14 December 1970 | 55°57′24″N 3°10′48″W | William Playfair, designed 1820-1824. No 9 built between 1823 and early 1830s. | 49807 | Upload another image |
| 10 Royal Terrace | | 14 December 1970 | 55°57′24″N 3°10′47″W | William Playfair, designed 1820-1824. No 10 built between 1823 and early 1830s. | 49808 | Upload another image |
| 11 and 12 Royal Terrace | | 14 December 1970 | 55°57′24″N 3°10′46″W | William Playfair, designed 1820-1824. No 11 and 12 built between 1823 and early 1830s. | 49809 | Upload another image |
| 13 Royal Terrace | | 14 December 1970 | 55°57′24″N 3°10′45″W | William Playfair, designed 1820-1824. No 13 built between 1823 and early 1830s. | 49810 | Upload another image |
| 14 Royal Terrace | | 14 December 1970 | 55°57′24″N 3°10′45″W | William Playfair, designed 1820-1824. No 14 built between 1823 and early 1830s. | 49811 | Upload another image |
| 15 Royal Terrace | | 14 December 1970 | 55°57′24″N 3°10′45″W | William Playfair, designed 1820-1824. No 15 built 1860s. | 49812 | Upload another image |
| Crowne Plaza Hotel (as of 2014; formerly the Royal Terrace Hotel) | 16-22 Royal Terrace | 14 December 1970 | 55°57′24″N 3°10′43″W | William Playfair, designed 1820-1824; Nos 16-22 built early 1860s. | 49813 | Upload another image |
| 23 Royal Terrace | | 14 December 1970 | 55°57′24″N 3°10′40″W | William Playfair, designed 1820-1824. No 23 built between 1823 and early 1830s. | 49814 | Upload another image |
| 24 Royal Terrace | | 14 December 1970 | 55°57′24″N 3°10′40″W | William Playfair, designed 1820-1824. No 24 built between 1823 and early 1830s. | 49815 | Upload another image |
| 25 Royal Terrace | | 14 December 1970 | 55°57′24″N 3°10′40″W | William Playfair, designed 1820-1824. No 25 built between 1823 and early 1830s. | 49816 | Upload another image |
| 26 Royal Terrace | | 14 December 1970 | 55°57′24″N 3°10′39″W | William Playfair, designed 1820-1824. No 26 built between 1823 and early 1830s. | 49817 | Upload another image |
| 27 Royal Terrace | | 14 December 1970 | 55°57′24″N 3°10′38″W | William Playfair, designed 1820-1824. No 27 built between 1823 and early 1830s. | 49818 | Upload another image |
| 28 Royal Terrace | | 14 December 1970 | 55°57′24″N 3°10′38″W | William Playfair, designed 1820-1824. No 28 built between 1823 and early 1830s. | 49819 | Upload another image |
| 29 Royal Terrace | | 14 December 1970 | 55°57′24″N 3°10′37″W | William Playfair, designed 1820-1824. No 29 built between 1823 and early 1830s. | 49820 | Upload another image |
| 30 Royal Terrace | | 14 December 1970 | 55°57′24″N 3°10′37″W | William Playfair, designed 1820-1824. No 30 built between 1823 and early 1830s. | 49821 | Upload another image |
| 31 Royal Terrace | | 14 December 1970 | 55°57′24″N 3°10′36″W | William Playfair, designed 1820-1824. No 31 built between 1854 and 1859. | 49823 | Upload another image |
| 32 Royal Terrace | | 14 December 1970 | 55°57′24″N 3°10′36″W | William Playfair, designed 1820-1824. No 32 built between 1854 and 1859. | 49824 | Upload another image |
| 33 Royal Terrace | | 14 December 1970 | 55°57′24″N 3°10′35″W | William Playfair, designed 1820-1824. No 33 built between 1854 and 1859. | 49825 | Upload another image |
| 34 Royal Terrace | | 14 December 1970 | 55°57′24″N 3°10′35″W | William Playfair, designed 1820-1824. No 34 built between 1854-1859. | 49826 | Upload another image |
| 35 Royal Terrace | | 14 December 1970 | 55°57′24″N 3°10′34″W | William Playfair, designed 1820-1824. No 35 built between 1823 and early 1830s. | 49827 | Upload another image |
| 36 Royal Terrace | | 14 December 1970 | 55°57′24″N 3°10′33″W | William Playfair, designed 1820-1824. No 36 built between 1823 and early 1830s. | 49828 | Upload another image |
| 37 Royal Terrace | | 14 December 1970 | 55°57′24″N 3°10′33″W | William Playfair, designed 1820-1824. No 37 built between 1823 and early 1830s. | 49829 | Upload another image |
| 38 Royal Terrace | | 14 December 1970 | 55°57′24″N 3°10′32″W | William Playfair, designed 1820-1824. No 38 built between 1823 and early 1830s. | 49830 | Upload another image |
| 39 Royal Terrace | | 14 December 1970 | 55°57′24″N 3°10′32″W | William Playfair, designed 1820-1824. No 39 built between 1823 and early 1830s. | 49831 | Upload another image |
| 40 Royal Terrace | | 14 December 1970 | 55°57′24″N 3°10′31″W | William Playfair, designed 1820-1824. No 40 built 1821-22. | 49832 | Upload another image |
| 1 Regent Terrace | | 16 December 1965 | 55°57′18″N 3°10′35″W | William Playfair, designed 1825 (redesigned 1831), built 1831-1833. | 29618 | Upload another image |
| 2 Regent Terrace | | 16 December 1965 | 55°57′15″N 3°10′41″W | William Playfair, designed 1825 (redesigned 1831), built 1831-1833. | 49765 | Upload another image |
| 3 Regent Terrace | | 16 December 1965 | 55°57′15″N 3°10′41″W | William Playfair, designed 1825, built 1826-1833. | 49766 | Upload another image |
| 4 Regent Terrace | | 16 December 1965 | 55°57′15″N 3°10′40″W | William Playfair, designed 1825, built 1826-1833. | 49767 | Upload another image |
| 5 Regent Terrace | | 16 December 1965 | 55°57′16″N 3°10′40″W | William Playfair, designed 1825, built 1826-1833. | 49768 | Upload another image |
| 6 Regent Terrace | | 16 December 1965 | 55°57′16″N 3°10′40″W | William Playfair, designed 1825, built 1826-1833. | 49769 | Upload another image |
| 7 Regent Terrace | | 16 December 1965 | 55°57′16″N 3°10′39″W | William Playfair, designed 1825, built 1826-1833. | 49770 | Upload another image |
| 8 Regent Terrace | | 16 December 1965 | 55°57′16″N 3°10′39″W | William Playfair, designed 1825, built 1826-1833. | 49771 | Upload another image |
| 9 Regent Terrace | | 16 December 1965 | 55°57′16″N 3°10′39″W | William Playfair, designed 1825, built 1826-1833. | 49772 | Upload another image |
| 10 Regent Terrace | | 16 December 1965 | 55°57′17″N 3°10′38″W | William Playfair, designed 1825, built 1826-1833. | 49773 | Upload another image |
| 11 Regent Terrace | | 16 December 1965 | 55°57′17″N 3°10′37″W | William Playfair, designed 1825, built 1826-1833. | 49774 | Upload another image |
| 12 Regent Terrace | | 16 December 1965 | 55°57′17″N 3°10′37″W | William Playfair, designed 1825, built 1826-1833. | 49775 | Upload another image See more images |
| 13 Regent Terrace | | 16 December 1965 | 55°57′17″N 3°10′37″W | William Playfair, designed 1825, built 1826-1833. | 49776 | Upload another image |
| 14 Regent Terrace | | 16 December 1965 | 55°57′17″N 3°10′36″W | William Playfair, designed 1825, built 1826-1833. | 49777 | Upload another image |
| 15 Regent Terrace | | 16 December 1965 | 55°57′17″N 3°10′36″W | William Playfair, designed 1825, built 1826-1833. | 49778 | Upload another image |
| 16 Regent Terrace | | 16 December 1965 | 55°57′17″N 3°10′35″W | William Playfair, designed 1825, built 1826-1833. | 49779 | Upload another image |
| 17 Regent Terrace | | 16 December 1965 | 55°57′18″N 3°10′35″W | William Playfair, designed 1825, completed by 1830. | 49780 | Upload another image |
| 18 Regent Terrace | | 16 December 1965 | 55°57′18″N 3°10′35″W | William Playfair, designed 1825, built 1826-1833. | 49781 | Upload another image |
| 19 Regent Terrace | | 16 December 1965 | 55°57′18″N 3°10′34″W | William Playfair, designed 1825, built 1826-1833. | 49782 | Upload another image |
| 20 Regent Terrace | | 16 December 1965 | 55°57′18″N 3°10′34″W | William Playfair, designed 1825, built 1826-1833. | 49783 | Upload another image |
| 21 Regent Terrace | | 16 December 1965 | 55°57′18″N 3°10′33″W | William Playfair, designed 1825, built 1826-1833. | 49784 | Upload another image |
| 22 Regent Terrace | | 16 December 1965 | 55°57′19″N 3°10′33″W | William Playfair, designed 1825, built 1826-1833. | 49785 | Upload another image |
| 23 Regent Terrace | | 16 December 1965 | 55°57′19″N 3°10′32″W | William Playfair, designed 1825, built 1826-1833. | 49786 | Upload another image |
| 24 Regent Terrace | | 16 December 1965 | 55°57′19″N 3°10′32″W | William Playfair, designed 1825, built 1826-1833. | 49787 | Upload another image |
| 25 Regent Terrace | | 16 December 1965 | 55°57′19″N 3°10′32″W | William Playfair, designed 1825, built 1826-1833. | 49790 | Upload another image |
| 26 Regent Terrace | | 16 December 1965 | 55°57′19″N 3°10′31″W | William Playfair, designed 1825, built 1826-1833. | 49791 | Upload another image |
| 27 Regent Terrace | | 16 December 1965 | 55°57′19″N 3°10′31″W | William Playfair, designed 1825, built 1826-1833. | 49792 | Upload another image |
| 28 Regent Terrace | | 16 December 1965 | 55°57′20″N 3°10′31″W | William Playfair, designed 1825, built 1826-1833. | 49793 | Upload another image |
| 29 Regent Terrace | | 16 December 1965 | 55°57′20″N 3°10′30″W | William Playfair, designed 1825, built 1826-1833. | 49794 | Upload another image |
| 30 Regent Terrace | | 16 December 1965 | 55°57′20″N 3°10′30″W | William Playfair, designed 1825, built 1826-1833. | 49795 | Upload another image |
| 31 Regent Terrace | | 16 December 1965 | 55°57′20″N 3°10′29″W | William Playfair, designed 1825, built 1826-1833. | 49796 | Upload another image |
| 32 Regent Terrace | | 16 December 1965 | 55°57′20″N 3°10′29″W | William Playfair, designed 1825, built 1826-1833. | 49797 | Upload another image |
| 33 Regent Terrace | | 16 December 1965 | 55°57′20″N 3°10′28″W | William Playfair, designed 1825, built 1826-1833. | 49798 | Upload another image |
| 34 Regent Terrace | | 16 December 1965 | 55°57′21″N 3°10′28″W | William Playfair, designed 1825, built 1826-1833. | 49799 | Upload another image |
| 1 Carlton Terrace | | 16 December 1965 | 55°57′22″N 3°10′25″W | William Playfair, designed 1821-1825, built from late 1820s to mid 1830s. | 28460 | Upload another image |
| 2, 3, 4 Carlton Terrace | | 16 December 1965 | 55°57′21″N 3°10′27″W | William Playfair, designed 1821-1825, built from late 1820s to mid 1830s. | 49746 | Upload another image |
| 5 Carlton Terrace | | 16 December 1965 | 55°57′22″N 3°10′25″W | William Playfair, designed 1821-1825, built from late 1820s to mid 1830s. | 49747 | Upload another image |
| 6 Carlton Terrace | | 16 December 1965 | 55°57′22″N 3°10′25″W | William Playfair, designed 1821-1825, built from late 1820s to mid 1830s. | 49748 | Upload another image |
| 7 Carlton Terrace | | 16 December 1965 | 55°57′22″N 3°10′25″W | William Playfair, designed 1821-1825, built from late 1820s to mid 1830s. | 49749 | Upload another image |
| 8 Carlton Terrace | | 16 December 1965 | 55°57′23″N 3°10′25″W | William Playfair, designed 1821-1825, built from late 1820s to mid 1830s. | 49750 | Upload another image |
| 9 Carlton Terrace | | 16 December 1965 | 55°57′23″N 3°10′25″W | William Playfair, designed 1821-1825, built from late 1820s to mid 1830s. | 49751 | Upload another image |
| 10 Carlton Terrace | | 16 December 1965 | 55°57′23″N 3°10′25″W | William Playfair, designed 1821-1825, built from late 1820s to mid 1830s. | 49752 | Upload another image |
| 11 Carlton Terrace | | 16 December 1965 | 55°57′23″N 3°10′25″W | William Playfair, designed 1821-1825, built from late 1820s to mid 1830s. | 49753 | Upload another image |
| 12 Carlton Terrace | | 16 December 1965 | 55°57′24″N 3°10′26″W | William Playfair, designed 1821-1825, built from late 1820s to mid 1830s. | 49754 | Upload another image |
| 13 Carlton Terrace | | 16 December 1965 | 55°57′24″N 3°10′27″W | William Playfair, designed 1821-1825, built from late 1820s to mid 1830s. | 49755 | Upload another image |
| 14 Carlton Terrace | | 16 December 1965 | 55°57′24″N 3°10′27″W | William Playfair, designed 1821-1825, built from late 1820s to mid 1830s. | 49756 | Upload another image |
| 15 Carlton Terrace | | 16 December 1965 | 55°57′24″N 3°10′28″W | William Playfair, designed 1821-1825, built from late 1820s to mid 1830s. | 49757 | Upload another image |
| 16 Carlton Terrace | | 16 December 1965 | 55°57′24″N 3°10′28″W | William Playfair, designed 1821-1825, built from late 1820s to mid 1830s. | 49758 | Upload another image |
| 17 Carlton Terrace | | 16 December 1965 | 55°57′24″N 3°10′29″W | William Playfair, designed 1821-1825, built from late 1820s to mid 1830s. | 49759 | Upload another image |
| 18 Carlton Terrace | | 16 December 1965 | 55°57′24″N 3°10′30″W | William Playfair, designed 1821-1825, built from late 1820s to mid 1830s. | 49760 | Upload another image |
| 19 Carlton Terrace | | 16 December 1965 | 55°57′24″N 3°10′30″W | William Playfair, designed 1821-1825, built from late 1820s to mid 1830s. | 49761 | Upload another image |
| Robert Louis Stevenson Memorial | West Princes Street Gardens | 15 October 2001 | 55°57′00″N 3°12′08″W | Ian Hamilton Finlay, 1999. | 48255 | Upload another image |
| 87 George Street | New Town | 13 January 1966 | 55°57′11″N 3°12′07″W | Circa 1775; interior by David Bryce, 1835; shopfront renewed 1910, and again 1993. | 43287 | Upload another image |
| 5-9 Hill Street | New Town | 3 March 1966 | 55°57′13″N 3°12′07″W | James Hill, 1788-1794 with later alterations. | 43296 | Upload another image |
| 11 and 13 Hill Street | New Town | 3 March 1966 | 55°57′13″N 3°12′08″W | James Hill, 1788-1794. | 43297 | Upload another image |
| 15 Hill Street | New Town | 3 March 1966 | 55°57′13″N 3°12′10″W | James Hill, 1788-1794. | 43298 | Upload another image |
| 6 and 8 Hill Street | New Town | 3 March 1966 | 55°57′12″N 3°12′07″W | James Hill, 1788-1794. | 43299 | Upload another image |
| 10 Hill Street | New Town | 3 March 1966 | 55°57′12″N 3°12′07″W | James Hill, 1788-1794. | 43300 | Upload another image |
| 12 Hill Street | New Town | 3 March 1966 | 55°57′12″N 3°12′08″W | James Hill, 1788-1794. | 43301 | Upload another image |
| 14 and 16 Hill Street | New Town | 3 March 1966 | 55°57′12″N 3°12′09″W | | 43302 | Upload another image |
| 18 and 20 Hill Street | New Town | 3 March 1966 | 55°57′12″N 3°12′09″W | James Hill, 1788-1794. | 43303 | Upload another image |
| 22 Hill Street | New Town | 3 March 1966 | 55°57′12″N 3°12′10″W | James Hill, 1788-1794. | 43304 | Upload another image |
| 24 Hill Street | New Town | 3 March 1966 | 55°57′12″N 3°12′11″W | James Hill, 1788-1794. | 43305 | Upload another image |
| 84-87 Princes Street, incorporating the New Club | Princes Street, New Town | 28 March 1996 | 55°57′08″N 3°11′53″W | Alan Reiach, Eric Hall & Partners, 1966-1969. | 43322 | Upload another image See more images |
| 9 and 10 St Andrew Square | | 28 March 1996 | 55°57′12″N 3°11′39″W | Basil Spence and Partners (work supervised by J Hardie Glover), 1956-1962. | 43349 | Upload another image |
| Thistle Street, 3 and 4 Thistle Court | | 13 January 1966 | 55°57′16″N 3°11′46″W | 1767-1768; subsequent alterations. | 43351 | Upload another image |
| 15 Young Street | | 3 March 1966 | 55°57′11″N 3°12′20″W | | 43366 | Upload another image |
| 16 Young Street | | 3 March 1966 | 55°57′10″N 3°12′20″W | | 43367 | Upload another image |
| 18 Young Street | | 3 March 1966 | 55°57′10″N 3°12′21″W | | 43368 | Upload another image |
| Cambridge Bar | 20 Young Street | 3 March 1966 | 55°57′10″N 3°12′21″W | | 43369 | Upload another image |
| Doric Pavilion | Queen Street Gardens, New Town | 12 June 1996 | 55°57′19″N 3°11′55″W | | 43498 | Upload another image |
| St Cuthbert's Church (Church of Scotland) | Lothian Road | 14 December 1970 | 55°56′59″N 3°12′20″W | | 27339 | Upload another image See more images |
| Waverley Station, 4, 17, 31 and 33 Waverley Bridge & 31, 32, 36-39 Market Street including Waverley Bridge and 45 Market Street (Sub-Structure Only) | | 12 November 1991 | 55°57′07″N 3°11′24″W | | 30270 | Upload another image See more images |
| 28 St Andrew Square | | 12 December 1974 | 55°57′19″N 3°11′35″W | | 30160 | Upload another image |
| 139 and 141 Princes Street | | 12 December 1974 | 55°57′02″N 3°12′25″W | | 30149 | Upload another image |
| 71 George Street | | 12 December 1974 | 55°57′12″N 3°12′03″W | | 30102 | Upload another image |
| 90 and 90A George Street | | 12 December 1974 | 55°57′08″N 3°12′07″W | | 30107 | Upload another image |
| City Art Centre | 1-6 Market Street | 12 December 1974 | 55°57′03″N 3°11′21″W | | 30139 | Upload another image |
| 34-40 Broughton Street | | 12 December 1974 | 55°57′29″N 3°11′23″W | | 30070 | Upload another image |
| 42-48A Broughton Street | | 12 December 1974 | 55°57′30″N 3°11′24″W | | 30071 | Upload another image |
| Freemasons' Hall | 96 George Street | 12 December 1974 | 55°57′08″N 3°12′09″W | | 30024 | Upload another image See more images |
| 7 Young Street | | 3 March 1966 | 55°57′11″N 3°12′18″W | | 30000 | Upload another image |
| 13 Young Street | | 3 March 1966 | 55°57′11″N 3°12′20″W | | 30001 | Upload another image |
| 17 Young Street | | 3 March 1966 | 55°57′11″N 3°12′21″W | | 30002 | Upload another image |
| 19 Young Street | | 3 March 1966 | 55°57′11″N 3°12′21″W | | 30003 | Upload another image |
| 21 Young Street | | 3 March 1966 | 55°57′11″N 3°12′22″W | | 30004 | Upload another image |
| 14 Young Street | | 3 March 1966 | 55°57′10″N 3°12′21″W | | 30007 | Upload another image |
| 22 Young Street | | 3 March 1966 | 55°57′10″N 3°12′22″W | | 30008 | Upload another image |
| 1-3C York Place | | 14 September 1966 | 55°57′20″N 3°11′33″W | | 29958 | Upload another image |
| 5, 5A York Place | | 14 September 1966 | 55°57′21″N 3°11′32″W | | 29959 | Upload another image |
| 7 York Place | | 14 September 1966 | 55°57′21″N 3°11′31″W | | 29960 | Upload another image |
| 9-13 York Place | | 14 September 1966 | 55°57′21″N 3°11′30″W | | 29961 | Upload another image |
| 15-19A York Place | | 14 September 1966 | 55°57′21″N 3°11′28″W | | 29962 | Upload another image |
| 21 York Place | | 14 September 1966 | 55°57′21″N 3°11′27″W | | 29963 | Upload another image |
| 27 York Place | | 14 September 1966 | 55°57′22″N 3°11′25″W | | 29964 | Upload another image |
| 29-31 York Place | | 14 September 1966 | 55°57′22″N 3°11′24″W | | 29965 | Upload another image |
| 33-37 York Place | | 14 September 1966 | 55°57′22″N 3°11′23″W | | 29966 | Upload another image |
| 39-43 York Place | | 14 September 1966 | 55°57′22″N 3°11′22″W | | 29967 | Upload another image |
| 47-49 York Place | | 14 September 1966 | 55°57′22″N 3°11′21″W | | 29969 | Upload another image |
| 51 York Place | | 14 September 1966 | 55°57′22″N 3°11′20″W | | 29970 | Upload another image |
| 53-55 York Place | | 14 September 1966 | 55°57′23″N 3°11′19″W | | 29971 | Upload another image |
| 57-61A York Place | | 14 September 1966 | 55°57′23″N 3°11′19″W | | 29972 | Upload another image |
| 63-67 York Place | | 14 September 1966 | 55°57′23″N 3°11′17″W | | 29973 | Upload another image |
| 69-73 York Place | | 14 September 1966 | 55°57′23″N 3°11′17″W | | 29974 | Upload another image |
| 2-4A York Place | | 14 September 1966 | 55°57′22″N 3°11′34″W | | 29975 | Upload another image |
| 6 York Place | | 14 September 1966 | 55°57′22″N 3°11′33″W | | 29976 | Upload another image |
| 8 and 8A York Place | | 14 September 1966 | 55°57′22″N 3°11′33″W | | 29977 | Upload another image |
| 10 and 10A York Place | | 14 September 1966 | 55°57′22″N 3°11′32″W | | 29978 | Upload another image |
| 12 York Place | | 14 September 1966 | 55°57′22″N 3°11′31″W | | 29979 | Upload another image |
| 14 York Place | | 14 September 1966 | 55°57′22″N 3°11′31″W | | 29980 | Upload another image |
| 16 York Place | | 14 September 1966 | 55°57′23″N 3°11′30″W | | 29981 | Upload another image |
| 18 York Place | | 14 September 1966 | 55°57′23″N 3°11′30″W | | 29982 | Upload another image |
| 20 York Place | | 14 September 1966 | 55°57′23″N 3°11′29″W | | 29983 | Upload another image |
| 22 York Place | | 14 September 1966 | 55°57′23″N 3°11′28″W | | 29984 | Upload another image |
| 24 York Place | | 14 September 1966 | 55°57′23″N 3°11′28″W | | 29985 | Upload another image |
| 26 York Place | | 14 September 1966 | 55°57′23″N 3°11′27″W | | 29986 | Upload another image |
| 28 York Place | | 14 September 1966 | 55°57′23″N 3°11′27″W | | 29987 | Upload another image |
| 30 York Place | | 14 September 1966 | 55°57′23″N 3°11′26″W | | 29988 | Upload another image |
| Raeburn House | 32 York Place | 14 September 1966 | 55°57′24″N 3°11′25″W | | 29989 | Upload another image |
| 34 York Place | | 14 September 1966 | 55°57′23″N 3°11′25″W | | 29990 | Upload another image |
| 36 York Place | | 14 September 1966 | 55°57′24″N 3°11′24″W | | 29991 | Upload another image |
| 38 York Place | | 14 September 1966 | 55°57′24″N 3°11′24″W | | 29992 | Upload another image |
| 40, 42 York Place | | 14 September 1966 | 55°57′24″N 3°11′23″W | | 29993 | Upload another image |
| 1-21 Waterloo Place | | 19 April 1966 | 55°57′13″N 3°11′17″W | | 29895 | Upload another image |
| 23-27 Waterloo Place | | 19 April 1966 | 55°57′14″N 3°11′12″W | | 29896 | Upload another image |
| Calton Convening Rooms | 29 Waterloo Place | 19 April 1966 | 55°57′15″N 3°11′09″W | | 29897 | Upload another image |
| 6-14 Waterloo Place | | 14 December 1970 | 55°57′12″N 3°11′15″W | | 29898 | Upload another image |
| 16-20 Waterloo Place | | 14 December 1970 | 55°57′13″N 3°11′13″W | | 29899 | Upload another image |
| 7 and 9 North St David Street and Queen Street | | 14 December 1970 | 55°57′19″N 3°11′40″W | | 29727 | Upload another image |
| 23, 24, 25 & 26 St James Square | | 14 December 1970 | 55°57′17″N 3°11′24″W | | 29728 | Upload another image |
| 3 and 3A St Andrew Square | | 14 December 1970 | 55°57′12″N 3°11′33″W | | 29696 | Upload another image |
| Guardian Royal Exchange | 12, 12A and 13 St Andrew Square | 8 December 1987 | 55°57′13″N 3°11′40″W | | 29697 | Upload another image |
| 21 and 22 St Andrew Square | | 13 April 1965 | 55°57′18″N 3°11′40″W | | 29698 | Upload another image |
| 23 and 23A St Andrew Square | | 13 April 1965 | 55°57′18″N 3°11′38″W | | 29700 | Upload another image |
| 26 St Andrew Square | | 13 April 1965 | 55°57′18″N 3°11′36″W | | 29703 | Upload another image |
| 35 St Andrew Square | | 13 April 1965 | 55°57′17″N 3°11′31″W | | 29704 | Upload another image |
| Dundas House | 36 St Andrew Square | 13 April 1965 | 55°57′16″N 3°11′27″W | Head office of the Royal Bank of Scotland | 29705 | Upload another image See more images |
| Bank of Scotland | 37 St Andrew Square | 13 April 1965 | 55°57′15″N 3°11′29″W | | 29706 | Upload another image |
| Bank of Scotland | 38 and 39 St Andrew Square | 13 April 1965 | 55°57′15″N 3°11′30″W | | 29707 | Upload another image |
| Royal Bank of Scotland | 42 St Andrew Square | 8 December 1987 | 55°57′14″N 3°11′29″W | | 29708 | Upload another image |
| 1-25 Royal Circus | | 14 September 1966 | 55°57′24″N 3°12′12″W | | 29677 | Upload another image |
| 2-32 Royal Circus | | 14 September 1966 | 55°57′27″N 3°12′13″W | | 29678 | Upload another image |
| Cafe Royal | West Register Street | 8 January 1970 | 55°57′14″N 3°11′26″W | | 29619 | Upload another image |
| Kenilworth Bar | 152 and 154 Rose Street | 12 December 1974 | 55°57′06″N 3°12′08″W | | 29651 | Upload another image |
| 4-6 Queen Street | | 13 April 1965 | 55°57′18″N 3°11′44″W | Occupied by BBC Scotland | 29532 | Upload another image |
| Royal College of Physicians of Edinburgh | 8 Queen Street | 3 March 1966 | 55°57′18″N 3°11′47″W | | 29535 | Upload another image |
| 11-13 Queen Street | | 3 March 1966 | 55°57′18″N 3°11′48″W | | 29536 | Upload another image |
| 14 Queen Street | | 3 March 1966 | 55°57′18″N 3°11′50″W | | 29538 | Upload another image |
| 18-20 Queen Street | | 3 March 1966 | 55°57′17″N 3°11′55″W | | 29542 | Upload another image |
| 21 Queen Street | | 14 December 1970 | 55°57′17″N 3°11′55″W | | 29543 | Upload another image |
| 22 Queen Street | | 14 December 1970 | 55°57′17″N 3°11′56″W | | 29544 | Upload another image |
| 23-25 Queen Street | | 14 December 1970 | 55°57′17″N 3°11′57″W | | 29545 | Upload another image |
| 26, 26A and 27 Queen Street (including Stewart House) | | 3 March 1966 | 55°57′16″N 3°11′58″W | | 29546 | Upload another image |
| 28 and 29 Queen Street | | 3 March 1966 | 55°57′16″N 3°11′59″W | | 29548 | Upload another image |
| 32 and 33 Queen Street | | 3 March 1966 | 55°57′16″N 3°12′01″W | | 29550 | Upload another image |
| 34 Queen Street | | 3 March 1966 | 55°57′16″N 3°12′01″W | | 29551 | Upload another image |
| 35-37 Queen Street | | 3 March 1966 | 55°57′16″N 3°12′02″W | | 29552 | Upload another image |
| 38 Queen Street | | 3 March 1966 | 55°57′15″N 3°12′03″W | | 29553 | Upload another image |
| 39 and 39A Queen Street | | 3 March 1966 | 55°57′15″N 3°12′05″W | | 29554 | Upload another image |
| 40-42 (Inclusive), with 40A and 42A Queen Street | | 3 March 1966 | 55°57′15″N 3°12′06″W | | 29555 | Upload another image |
| 43 (Hogarth House) and 44 Queen Street | | 3 March 1966 | 55°57′15″N 3°12′08″W | | 29556 | Upload another image |
| 45-47 Queen Street | | 3 March 1966 | 55°57′14″N 3°12′08″W | | 29557 | Upload another image |
| 48 Queen Street | | 3 March 1966 | 55°57′14″N 3°12′09″W | the offices of Francis Brodie Imlach | 29558 | Upload another image |
| 49, 49A, 50 and 50A Queen Street | | 3 March 1966 | 55°57′14″N 3°12′10″W | | 29559 | Upload another image |
| 51 Queen Street | | 3 March 1966 | 55°57′14″N 3°12′11″W | | 29560 | Upload another image |
| 52 and 53 Queen Street | | 3 March 1966 | 55°57′14″N 3°12′11″W | | 29561 | Upload another image |
| 54 Queen Street | | 3 March 1966 | 55°57′14″N 3°12′12″W | | 29562 | Upload another image |
| 55-57 Queen Street | | 3 March 1966 | 55°57′14″N 3°12′13″W | | 29563 | Upload another image |
| 58 Queen Street | | 3 March 1966 | 55°57′14″N 3°12′14″W | | 29564 | Upload another image |
| 60 Queen Street and 58A, 60 and 62 North Castle Street | | 3 March 1966 | 55°57′13″N 3°12′16″W | | 29566 | Upload another image |
| 61, 61A, 62 & 63 Queen Street | | 3 March 1966 | 55°57′13″N 3°12′17″W | | 29567 | Upload another image |
| 64 Queen Street | | 3 March 1966 | 55°57′13″N 3°12′18″W | | 29568 | Upload another image |
| 65 Queen Street | | 3 March 1966 | 55°57′13″N 3°12′19″W | | 29569 | Upload another image |
| 66 and 67 Queen Street, with 33 and 35 Young Street Lane North | | 3 March 1966 | 55°57′13″N 3°12′19″W | | 29570 | Upload another image |
| 74-77 (Inclusive) Queen Street | | 3 March 1966 | 55°57′11″N 3°12′23″W | | 29571 | Upload another image |
| 78 and 78A Queen Street | | 3 March 1966 | 55°57′12″N 3°12′24″W | | 29573 | Upload another image |
| 79, 79A and 80 Queen Street and 5 and 6 North Charlotte Street | | 3 March 1966 | 55°57′11″N 3°12′25″W | | 29574 | Upload another image |
| 30 Princes Street | Formerly Forsyth's | 14 September 1966 | 55°57′11″N 3°11′31″W | | 29503 | Upload another image See more images |
| Jenners Department Store | 47-52 Princes Street | 14 December 1970 | 55°57′11″N 3°11′39″W | | 29505 | Upload another image See more images |
| Romanes and Paterson | 61-2 Princes Street | 19 December 1979 | 55°57′10″N 3°11′43″W | | 29506 | Upload another image |
| 94-96 Princes Street | | 19 December 1979 | 55°57′07″N 3°11′57″W | | 29507 | Upload another image |
| St Andrew's and St George's Church | George Street | 13 January 1966 | 55°57′15″N 3°11′45″W | | 27283 | Upload another image See more images |
| Assembly Rooms | 54 George Street | 13 January 1966 | 55°57′10″N 3°11′55″W | | 27567 | Upload another image See more images |
| City Observatory | Calton Hill | 19 April 1966 | 55°57′18″N 3°11′01″W | | 27603 | Upload another image See more images |
| Observatory House (Old Observatory), City Observatory | Calton Hill | 19 April 1966 | 55°57′17″N 3°11′03″W | | 27608 | Upload another image See more images |
| National Gallery of Scotland | The Mound | 14 December 1970 | 55°57′03″N 3°11′44″W | | 27679 | Upload another image See more images |
| 39-43 North Castle Street | | 3 March 1966 | 55°57′11″N 3°12′12″W | | 28464 | Upload another image |
| 45, 45A, 47, 49 and 49A North Castle Street | | 3 March 1966 | 55°57′11″N 3°12′12″W | | 28465 | Upload another image |
| 51-55 North Castle Street | | 3 March 1966 | 55°57′12″N 3°12′13″W | | 28466 | Upload another image |
| 57-61 North Castle Street | | 3 March 1966 | 55°57′13″N 3°12′13″W | | 28467 | Upload another image |
| 63-69 North Castle Street | | 3 March 1966 | 55°57′13″N 3°12′14″W | | 28468 | Upload another image |
| 16-20 and 20A Castle Street and Connery's Bar, Rose Street | | 3 March 1966 | 55°57′06″N 3°12′13″W | | 28472 | Upload another image |
| 28 Castle Street | | 3 March 1966 | 55°57′07″N 3°12′13″W | | 28474 | Upload another image |
| 36-40 North Castle Street | | 3 March 1966 | 55°57′10″N 3°12′15″W | | 28476 | Upload another image |
| 42-46 North Castle Street | | 3 March 1966 | 55°57′11″N 3°12′16″W | | 28477 | Upload another image |
| 48-52 North Castle Street | | 3 March 1966 | 55°57′12″N 3°12′16″W | | 28478 | Upload another image |
| 54-58 and 58A North Castle Street | | 3 March 1966 | 55°57′12″N 3°12′16″W | | 28479 | Upload another image |
| 1-11 Charlotte Square | | 3 March 1966 | 55°57′09″N 3°12′28″W | | 28502 | Upload another image |
| 12-17 Charlotte Square | | 3 March 1966 | 55°57′07″N 3°12′34″W | | 28503 | Upload another image |
| 18-23 Charlotte Square | | 3 March 1966 | 55°57′04″N 3°12′33″W | | 28504 | Upload another image |
| 24-32 Charlotte Square, 13-19 Hope Street and 14 and 16 South Charlotte Street | | 3 March 1966 | 55°57′03″N 3°12′29″W | | 28505 | Upload another image |
| 33-39 Charlotte Square and 142-146 George Street | | 3 March 1966 | 55°57′05″N 3°12′22″W | | 28506 | Upload another image |
| 40-46 Charlotte Square and 143 George Street | | 3 March 1966 | 55°57′08″N 3°12′23″W | | 28507 | Upload another image |
| 1 North Charlotte Street | | 3 March 1966 | 55°57′10″N 3°12′24″W | | 28508 | Upload another image |
| 2-4 North Charlotte Street | | 3 March 1966 | 55°57′10″N 3°12′24″W | | 28509 | Upload another image |
| 5-9 South Charlotte Street | | 3 March 1966 | 55°57′03″N 3°12′21″W | | 28512 | Upload another image |
| 11 and 13 South Charlotte Street | | 3 March 1966 | 55°57′04″N 3°12′21″W | | 28514 | Upload another image |
| 15 South Charlotte Street | | 3 March 1966 | 55°57′04″N 3°12′21″W | | 28515 | Upload another image |
| 12 South Charlotte Street | | 3 March 1966 | 55°57′04″N 3°12′24″W | | 28516 | Upload another image |
| 1 and 2 Thistle Court | Thistle Street | 13 January 1966 | 55°57′16″N 3°11′43″W | | 29836 | Upload another image |
| The Playhouse Theatre | 18-22 Greenside Place | 12 December 1974 | 55°57′24″N 3°11′05″W | | 30029 | Upload another image See more images |
| 1-13A Royal Crescent | | 22 September 1965 | 55°57′34″N 3°11′48″W | | 29679 | Upload another image |
| 15-23A Royal Crescent | | 22 September 1965 | 55°57′34″N 3°11′52″W | | 29680 | Upload another image |
| 1-8 Randolph Crescent, with 2 and 3-9 Randolph Lane | | 14 December 1970 | 55°57′06″N 3°12′39″W | | 29600 | Upload another image |
| 9-17 Randolph Crescent | | 14 December 1970 | 55°57′08″N 3°12′46″W | | 29601 | Upload another image |
| 1-8 Randolph Place, and 1 Randolph Crescent, with 1, 1A Randolph Lane | | 14 December 1970 | 55°57′05″N 3°12′37″W | | 29602 | Upload another image |
| 49 Northumberland Street | | 24 May 1966 | 55°57′24″N 3°12′01″W | | 29480 | Upload another image |
| 1 Northumberland Street | | 22 September 1965 | 55°57′27″N 3°11′47″W | | 29445 | Upload another image |
| 3-17A Northumberland Street | | 22 September 1965 | 55°57′27″N 3°11′48″W | | 29446 | Upload another image |
| 19-33 Northumberland Street | | 22 September 1965 | 55°57′26″N 3°11′52″W | | 29447 | Upload another image |
| 39-41 Northumberland Street | | 24 May 1966 | 55°57′25″N 3°11′59″W | | 29448 | Upload another image |
| 43-47 Northumberland Street | | 24 May 1966 | 55°57′25″N 3°12′00″W | | 29449 | Upload another image |
| 51-61 Northumberland Street | | 24 May 1966 | 55°57′24″N 3°12′04″W | | 29451 | Upload another image |
| 63 and 65 Northumberland Street | | 24 May 1966 | 55°57′24″N 3°12′06″W | | 29452 | Upload another image |
| 67 and 69 Northumberland Street | | 24 May 1966 | 55°57′24″N 3°12′07″W | | 29453 | Upload another image |
| 6-12 Northumberland Street | | 30 September 1964 | 55°57′25″N 3°11′50″W | | 29454 | Upload another image |
| 14-26 Northumberland Street | | 30 September 1964 | 55°57′25″N 3°11′52″W | | 29455 | Upload another image |
| 28-30A Northumberland Street | | 30 September 1964 | 55°57′25″N 3°11′55″W | | 29456 | Upload another image |
| 38-40A Northumberland Street | | 24 May 1966 | 55°57′24″N 3°11′59″W | | 29457 | Upload another image |
| 42-68 Northumberland Street | | 24 May 1966 | 55°57′23″N 3°12′04″W | | 29458 | Upload another image |
| 70 Northumberland Street | | 24 May 1966 | 55°57′23″N 3°12′06″W | | 29459 | Upload another image |
| 2-5 Northumberland Place | | 30 September 1964 | 55°57′26″N 3°11′45″W | | 29444 | Upload another image |
| 5 and 7 Nelson Street | | 22 September 1965 | 55°57′25″N 3°11′45″W | | 29384 | Upload another image |
| 9-13 Nelson Street | | 22 September 1965 | 55°57′25″N 3°11′46″W | | 29385 | Upload another image |
| 15, 17 and 17A Nelson Street | | 22 September 1965 | 55°57′26″N 3°11′46″W | | 29386 | Upload another image |
| 19-23 Nelson Street | | 22 September 1965 | 55°57′27″N 3°11′44″W | | 29387 | Upload another image |
| 25-29 Nelson Street | | 22 September 1965 | 55°57′28″N 3°11′44″W | | 29388 | Upload another image |
| 10-14 Nelson Street | | 22 September 1965 | 55°57′25″N 3°11′48″W | | 29390 | Upload another image |
| 16 and 18 Nelson Street | | 22 September 1965 | 55°57′26″N 3°11′49″W | | 29391 | Upload another image |
| 24-28 Nelson Street | | 22 September 1965 | 55°57′28″N 3°11′47″W | | 29392 | Upload another image |
| 1-18A Moray Place, and 10 Doune Terrace, with 1-7 Gloucester Square, and 5-10A Gloucester Lane | | 3 October 1967 | 55°57′19″N 3°12′26″W | | 29368 | Upload another image |
| 19-36A Moray Place | | 3 October 1967 | 55°57′19″N 3°12′36″W | | 29369 | Upload another image |
| 37-43 Moray Place | | 3 October 1967 | 55°57′14″N 3°12′29″W | | 29370 | Upload another image |
| 44-50A Moray Place, with 6 and 7 Wemyss Place Mews | | 3 October 1967 | 55°57′14″N 3°12′27″W | | 29371 | Upload another image |
| 1-41 London Street | | 22 April 1965 | 55°57′31″N 3°11′35″W | | 29260 | Upload another image |
| 2-36 London Street | | 22 April 1965 | 55°57′33″N 3°11′32″W | | 29261 | Upload another image |
| 42-54 London Street | | 22 April 1965 | 55°57′33″N 3°11′28″W | | 29262 | Upload another image |
| Gayfield House | 18 East London Street | 22 September 1965 | 55°57′37″N 3°11′15″W | | 29263 | Upload another image See more images |
| 1-5 Gloucester Place | | 3 October 1967 | 55°57′23″N 3°12′24″W | | 29141 | Upload another image |
| 2 Gloucester Place | | 3 October 1967 | 55°57′25″N 3°12′24″W | | 29142 | Upload another image |
| 5-9A India Street | | 3 October 1967 | 55°57′19″N 3°12′18″W | | 29127 | Upload another image |
| 11-15 India Street | | 3 October 1967 | 55°57′20″N 3°12′19″W | | 29128 | Upload another image |
| 17-21A India Street | | 3 October 1967 | 55°57′21″N 3°12′19″W | | 29129 | Upload another image |
| 23-27A India Street | | 3 October 1967 | 55°57′21″N 3°12′20″W | | 29130 | Upload another image |
| 4-10 India Street | | 3 October 1967 | 55°57′18″N 3°12′21″W | | 29131 | Upload another image |
| 12 India Street | | 3 October 1967 | 55°57′19″N 3°12′21″W | | 29132 | Upload another image |
| 14 India Street | | 3 October 1967 | 55°57′19″N 3°12′21″W | | 29133 | Upload another image See more images |
| 16 India Street | | 3 October 1967 | 55°57′19″N 3°12′22″W | | 29134 | Upload another image |
| 18 India Street | | 3 October 1967 | 55°57′20″N 3°12′22″W | | 29135 | Upload another image |
| 20-24 India Street | | 3 October 1967 | 55°57′20″N 3°12′22″W | | 29136 | Upload another image |
| 26-30 India Street | | 3 October 1967 | 55°57′21″N 3°12′22″W | | 29137 | Upload another image |
| 32 India Street | | 3 October 1967 | 55°57′21″N 3°12′23″W | | 29138 | Upload another image |
| 34 India Street | | 3 October 1967 | 55°57′22″N 3°12′23″W | | 29139 | Upload another image |
| 36-42 India Street | | 3 October 1967 | 55°57′22″N 3°12′23″W | | 29140 | Upload another image |
| 54-60 India Street | | 3 October 1967 | 55°57′25″N 3°12′25″W | | 29144 | Upload another image |
| 3-7 Howe Street | | 10 November 1966 | 55°57′21″N 3°12′06″W | | 29107 | Upload another image |
| 11 and 13 Howe Street | | 10 November 1966 | 55°57′21″N 3°12′06″W | | 29109 | Upload another image |
| 19 and 19B Howe Street | | 10 November 1966 | 55°57′22″N 3°12′07″W | | 29111 | Upload another image |
| 21-23B Howe Street | | 10 November 1966 | 55°57′24″N 3°12′07″W | | 29112 | Upload another image |
| 25-29 Howe Street | | 10 November 1966 | 55°57′24″N 3°12′08″W | | 29113 | Upload another image |
| 31-37 Howe Street | | 10 November 1966 | 55°57′25″N 3°12′08″W | | 29114 | Upload another image |
| 32-38 Howe Street | | 10 November 1966 | 55°57′23″N 3°12′10″W | | 29121 | Upload another image |
| 6-10 Hope Street | | 3 March 1966 | 55°57′02″N 3°12′31″W | | 29093 | Upload another image |
| 12-16 Hope Street | | 3 March 1966 | 55°57′03″N 3°12′32″W | | 29094 | Upload another image |
| 71 Hanover Street | | 13 January 1966 | 55°57′14″N 3°11′50″W | | 28999 | Upload another image |
| 79-89 Hanover Street | | 24 March 1966 | 55°57′15″N 3°11′50″W | | 29001 | Upload another image |
| 113-123 (odd nos, including 117A) Hanover Street | | 3 March 1966 | 55°57′17″N 3°11′51″W | | 29004 | Upload another image |
| 28 and 30 Hanover Street | | 24 March 1966 | 55°57′10″N 3°11′51″W | | 29007 | Upload another image |
| 1-19 Heriot Row | | 24 May 1966 | 55°57′22″N 3°12′00″W | | 29025 | Upload another image |
| 20-42 Heriot Row | | 24 May 1966 | 55°57′18″N 3°12′18″W | | 29026 | Upload another image |
| 43-47 Heriot Row | | 24 May 1966 | 55°57′18″N 3°12′20″W | | 29027 | Upload another image |
| 1 and 3 Hill Street | | 3 March 1966 | 55°57′13″N 3°12′07″W | | 29080 | Upload another image |
| Edinburgh Lodge No 1 | 17, 19 and 19A Hill Street | 3 March 1966 | 55°57′13″N 3°12′10″W | | 29081 | Upload another image |
| 21 and 23 Hill Street | | 14 December 1970 | 55°57′12″N 3°12′11″W | | 29082 | Upload another image |
| 2 and 4 Hill Street | | 3 March 1966 | 55°57′12″N 3°12′07″W | | 29083 | Upload another image |
| 3-41 Great King Street | | 15 July 1965 | 55°57′28″N 3°11′52″W | | 28962 | Upload another image |
| 45-89 Great King Street | | 24 May 1966 | 55°57′27″N 3°12′00″W | | 28963 | Upload another image |
| 2-42A Great King Street | | 15 July 1965 | 55°57′30″N 3°11′53″W | | 28964 | Upload another image |
| 44-86 Great King Street | | 24 May 1966 | 55°57′29″N 3°12′00″W | | 28965 | Upload another image |
| 1-5 Great Stuart Street | | 14 December 1970 | 55°57′14″N 3°12′36″W | | 28966 | Upload another image |
| 7-19 Great Stuart Street | | 14 December 1970 | 55°57′10″N 3°12′40″W | | 28967 | Upload another image |
| 2-6 Great Stuart Street | | 14 December 1970 | 55°57′13″N 3°12′33″W | | 28968 | Upload another image |
| 8-20 Great Stuart Street | | 14 December 1970 | 55°57′08″N 3°12′40″W | | 28969 | Upload another image |
| 7-15 Gloucester Place | | 3 October 1967 | 55°57′23″N 3°12′26″W | | 28925 | Upload another image |
| 4-14 Gloucester Place | | 3 October 1967 | 55°57′24″N 3°12′28″W | | 28926 | Upload another image |
| 6-11 Glenfinlas Street | | 14 December 1970 | 55°57′10″N 3°12′35″W | | 28922 | Upload another image |
| 1-5 Gayfield Place and 33-33A Gayfield Square | | 19 April 1966 | 55°57′32″N 3°11′04″W | | 28798 | Upload another image |
| 12-17A Gayfield Square | | 19 April 1966 | 55°57′35″N 3°11′08″W | | 28805 | Upload another image |
| 24, 25 and 26 Gayfield Square | | 19 April 1966 | 55°57′34″N 3°11′07″W | | 28807 | Upload another image |
| 43-49 Frederick Street | | 24 March 1966 | 55°57′13″N 3°12′02″W | | 28785 | Upload another image |
| 58-62 and 62A Frederick Street | | 24 March 1966 | 55°57′14″N 3°12′05″W | | 28796 | Upload another image |
| 41A-45 Broughton Street | | 16 June 1966 | 55°57′28″N 3°11′11″W | | 28772 | Upload another image |
| 1-11 Forres Street | | 14 December 1970 | 55°57′14″N 3°12′27″W | | 28768 | Upload another image |
| 2-10 Forres Street | | 14 December 1970 | 55°57′13″N 3°12′29″W | | 28769 | Upload another image |
| 23-23C Dundas Street | | 18 August 1964 | 55°57′25″N 3°11′56″W | | 28706 | Upload another image |
| 53-65 Dundas Street | | 13 September 1964 | 55°57′30″N 3°11′58″W | | 28709 | Upload another image |
| 67-77 Dundas Street | | 13 September 1964 | 55°57′31″N 3°11′59″W | | 28710 | Upload another image |
| 68-76 Dundas Street | | 10 November 1966 | 55°57′30″N 3°12′01″W | | 28720 | Upload another image |
| 78-86A Dundas Street | | 10 November 1966 | 55°57′31″N 3°12′02″W | | 28721 | Upload another image |
| 1-7 Dundonald Street | | 22 September 1965 | 55°57′32″N 3°11′50″W | | 28723 | Upload another image |
| 30-34 Elder Street | | 14 December 1970 | 55°57′21″N 3°11′27″W | | 28731 | Upload another image |
| 4 Dublin Street | | 18 August 1964 | 55°57′21″N 3°11′37″W | | 28688 | Upload another image |
| 1-10 Drummond Place | | 22 April 1965 | 55°57′29″N 3°11′40″W | | 28665 | Upload another image |
| 11-15 Drummond Place | | 22 April 1965 | 55°57′28″N 3°11′48″W | | 28666 | Upload another image |
| 16-20 Drummond Place | | 22 April 1965 | 55°57′31″N 3°11′49″W | | 28667 | Upload another image |
| 21-30 Drummond Place | | 22 April 1965 | 55°57′33″N 3°11′43″W | | 28668 | Upload another image |
| 31-36A Drummond Place | | 22 April 1965 | 55°57′33″N 3°11′38″W | | 28669 | Upload another image |
| 37-42 Drummond Place | | 22 April 1965 | 55°57′31″N 3°11′36″W | | 28670 | Upload another image |
| 1-9C Doune Terrace, with 8-11 Gloucester Square | | 3 October 1967 | 55°57′21″N 3°12′28″W | | 28659 | Upload another image |
| 1-11 Darnaway Street | | 3 October 1967 | 55°57′17″N 3°12′25″W | | 28632 | Upload another image |
| 2-12 Darnaway Street, with 8-10 Wemyss Place Mews | | 3 October 1967 | 55°57′16″N 3°12′23″W | | 28633 | Upload another image |
| 36-62B Cumberland Street | | 10 November 1966 | 55°57′31″N 3°12′05″W | | 28614 | Upload another image |
| Rock House | 28 Calton Hill | 19 April 1966 | 55°57′16″N 3°11′07″W | | 28411 | Upload another image |
| 35 and 37 Broughton Street | | 16 June 1966 | 55°57′26″N 3°11′17″W | | 28361 | Upload another image |
| 10-12 Broughton Street | | 16 June 1966 | 55°57′25″N 3°11′18″W | | 28366 | Upload another image |
| 4-12 Broughton Place | | 16 June 1966 | 55°57′32″N 3°11′22″W | | 28355 | Upload another image |
| 1-11 Albyn Place | | 14 December 1970 | 55°57′13″N 3°12′25″W | | 28234 | Upload another image |
| 1-15BAinslie Place | | 14 December 1970 | 55°57′11″N 3°12′40″W | | 28213 | Upload another image |
| 16-20 Ainslie Place, and 13-14 Glenfinlas Street | | 14 December 1970 | 55°57′10″N 3°12′37″W | | 28214 | Upload another image |
| 21-25A Ainslie Place | | 14 December 1970 | 55°57′12″N 3°12′33″W | | 28215 | Upload another image |
| 2-7 Abercromby Place | | 14 December 1970 | 55°57′24″N 3°11′38″W | | 28210 | Upload another image |
| 8 and 8A-20 Abercromby Place | | 18 August 1964 | 55°57′24″N 3°11′45″W | | 28211 | Upload another image |
| 21-34 Abercromby Place | | 18 August 1964 | 55°57′22″N 3°11′54″W | | 28212 | Upload another image |
| St John's Church (Episcopal) | Lothian Road | 14 December 1970 | 55°57′00″N 3°12′22″W | | 27401 | Upload another image See more images |
| Statue of William Pitt | George Street | 13 January 1966 | 55°57′11″N 3°12′01″W | | 27868 | Upload another image See more images |
| Former St George's Chapel (Episcopal) | 5B York Place | 14 September 1966 | 55°57′21″N 3°11′31″W | | 27374 | Upload another image |
| St Paul's and St George's (Scottish Episcopal) Church | York Place | 24 May 1966 | 55°57′24″N 3°11′19″W | | 27509 | Upload another image See more images |
| Former Albany Street Chapel | 24A Broughton Street | 24 May 1966 | 55°57′27″N 3°11′20″W | | 27157 | Upload another image |
| 45-57A Albany Street | | 24 May 1966 | 55°57′27″N 3°11′21″W | | 46114 | Upload another image |
| Glasite Meeting House | 33 Barony Street | 30 September 1964 | 55°57′28″N 3°11′30″W | | 26973 | Upload another image |
| 14-18 Broughton Place | | 16 June 1966 | 55°57′32″N 3°11′20″W | | 45928 | Upload another image |
| 20-28 Broughton Place | | 16 June 1966 | 55°57′32″N 3°11′19″W | | 45929 | Upload another image |
| 30-34 Broughton Place | | 16 June 1966 | 55°57′33″N 3°11′17″W | | 45930 | Upload another image |
| 1-11 St Colme Street | | 14 December 1970 | 55°57′12″N 3°12′30″W | | 29724 | Upload another image |
| 1-11 Wemyss Place | | 14 December 1970 | 55°57′14″N 3°12′21″W | | 29901 | Upload another image |
| Moray Place Bank Gardens, Railings and Gates | | 31 March 1999 | 55°57′17″N 3°12′31″W | | 46120 | Upload another image |
| 4-8 Nelson Street | | 22 September 1965 | 55°57′25″N 3°11′48″W | | 49491 | Upload another image |
| Greenside Parish Church | Royal Terrace | 16 December 1965 | 55°57′25″N 3°10′56″W | | 27007 | Upload another image See more images |
| 1-5 Blenheim Place | | 16 December 1965 | 55°57′27″N 3°11′03″W | | 28334 | Upload another image |
| 6-10 Blenheim Place and 2 and 3 Greenside End | | 16 December 1965 | 55°57′27″N 3°10′59″W | | 28335 | Upload another image |
| 27, 28 and 29 Gayfield Square | Leith Walk | 19 April 1966 | 55°57′33″N 3°11′06″W | | 49149 | Upload another image |
| 30, 31 and 32 Gayfield Square | Leith Walk | 19 April 1966 | 55°57′33″N 3°11′05″W | | 49150 | Upload another image |
| 1-3 Annandale Street | | 19 April 1966 | 55°57′34″N 3°11′02″W | | 28252 | Upload another image |
| 5-9 Annandale Street | | 19 April 1966 | 55°57′35″N 3°11′03″W | | 28253 | Upload another image |
| 6-10A Annandale Street | | 19 April 1966 | 55°57′36″N 3°11′00″W | | 28254 | Upload another image |
| 18-22A Annandale Street | | 19 April 1966 | 55°57′37″N 3°11′02″W | | 28255 | Upload another image |
| Formerly Broughton Place Church and Offices | 33 and 35 Broughton Place | 16 June 1966 | 55°57′33″N 3°11′14″W | | 26771 | Upload another image See more images |
| St Stephen's Church (Church of Scotland) | St Stephen Street and St Vincent Street | 14 December 1970 | 55°57′31″N 3°12′13″W | | 27527 | Upload another image See more images |
| 1-11 Bellevue Crescent | | 22 September 1965 | 55°57′36″N 3°11′34″W | | 28285 | Upload another image |
| 15-27 Bellevue Crescent, and 5-9 Cornwallis Place | | 22 September 1965 | 55°57′39″N 3°11′40″W | | 28286 | Upload another image |
| St Mary's Church (Church of Scotland) | 13 Bellevue Crescent | 22 September 1965 | 55°57′37″N 3°11′37″W | | 27461 | Upload another image See more images |
| 1-10 Mansfield Place | | 22 September 1965 | 55°57′35″N 3°11′30″W | | 29302 | Upload another image |

== Bibliography ==
- Scottish Pioneers of the Greek Revival, The Scottish Georgian Society, 1984
- Clarisse Godard Desmarest, The New Town of Edinburgh: An Architectural Celebration, John Donald, 2019
- New Town Conservation Area Character Appraisal, Edinburgh City council, n.d. (PDF)
- J.Gifford, C.McWilliam, D.Walker, The Buildings of Scotland: Edinburgh, Penguin, 1984
- George Gordon (ed.), Perspectives of the Scottish City, Elsevier, 1985
- Anthony Lewis, The Builders of Edinburgh New Town 1767-1795, Spire Books, 2014
- Ian G. Lindsay, Georgian Edinburgh, Oliver and Boyd, 1948
- Charles McKean, Edinburgh: An Illustrated Architectural Guide, Rutland Press, 1992
- Kirsten Carter McKee, Calton Hill: And the plans for Edinburgh's Third New Town, John Donald, 2018
- Ray McKenzie, Public Sculpture of Edinburgh (Volume 2): The New Town, Leith and the Outer Suburbs, Liverpool University Press, 2018
- Fiona Pearson, Virtue and Vision: Sculpture and Scotland 1540-1990, National Galleries of Scotland, 1991
- A. J. Youngson, The Making of Classical Edinburgh, Edinburgh University Press, 1966
