= Robin Chapel =

Church in Edinburgh, Scotland

The Robin Chapel
- Thistle Trust
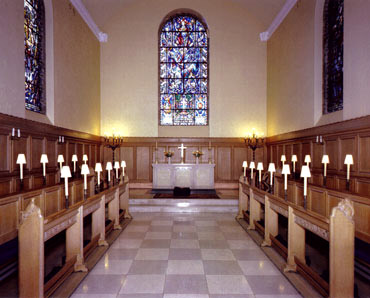
- The Robin Chapel
- 55°55′54″N 3°07′54″W
- Location: Edinburgh EH16 4EA
- Country: Scotland
- Denomination: Inter-denominational
- Churchmanship: Ecumenical
- Website: www.robinchapel.org.uk

History
- Status: Private Chapel
- Founded: 1950, with the motto, 'at spes non fracta mens mihi regnum'.
- Founder(s): Sir Francis Tudsbery & Lady Isabella Tudsbery
- Dedication: In memory of their only son Robin
- Dedicated: 1953
- Consecrated: 1953

Architecture
- Functional status: in use
- Heritage designation: Category A listed, Historic Environment Scotland
- Architect: John F Matthew FRIBA
- Architectural type: Arts and Crafts style
- Groundbreaking: 1950
- Completed: 1953

The Robin Chapel is an ecumenical Christian place of worship in the Craigmillar area of Edinburgh, Scotland. It was built in memory of Lieutenant Robin Tudsbery, who was killed in the closing days of World War II. The chapel sits within the grounds of the Thistle Foundation, a housing complex originally built for disabled armed forces personnel.

== History ==
The Thistle Foundation was established as a charity in 1944 by Sir Francis and Lady Isabella Tudsbery to provide housing and care for disabled war veterans and their families. Nowadays, the charity offers a variety of services to people with disabilities and health conditions, and has an additional base in Renfrew.

In 1950 the foundation stone for a chapel was laid in the grounds of the Thistle Foundation. The chapel was conceived and built by the Tudsberys as a memorial to their only son, Robin, who, as a 25-year-old lieutenant in the Royal Horse Guards (The Blues), was killed in the last days of World War II. It was completed in 1953, and was dedicated in the presence of Queen Elizabeth the Queen Mother and Princess Margaret. The chapel holds historical importance as a war memorial and as a pioneering home of ecumenical worship, devoted to "furthering the spirit of unity and concord among Christian people". This spirit is further repeated in the short statement which can be found at the opening of the service sheet:

'The Robin Chapel is dedicated to the glory of God, and to His service, by all Christians and by all denominations of Christ's Church. Every Service held within the Robin Chapel shall be open accordingly to all Christians of any denomination.'

== Design and construction ==
Christian battles Apollyon in one of the stained glass windows by Sadie McLellan

The chapel was designed by John F Matthew, of the architectural firm Lorimer & Matthew, in the Scottish Arts and Crafts style. Many craftspeople were involved in the finish of the interior, including Sadie McLellan, who created the stained glass windows which feature scenes from The Pilgrim's Progress by John Bunyan. The inscription over the entrance to the chapel is also taken from The Pilgrim's Progress: "Come In, Come In, Eternal Glory Thou Shalt Win". The oak panelling and choir stalls show carvings of animals and birds, a reminder of Robin Tudsbury's love of animals and the countryside surrounding the family home of Champfleurie in West Lothian. Many of the carvings were worked by Thomas Good (who also did much of the carving in St Magnus Cathedral, Kirkwall).

== Worship ==
The chapel holds weekly services of Choral Evensong, as well as special services to commemorate key events in Robin Tudsbery's life, at 4pm. The chapel is open to all, and all have place here, where the love of God dwells. The Chapel Choir (a group of adult mixed voices) sings at the weekly services, led by the director of music and accompanied on the organ. The ecumenical nature of the chapel is reflected in the invitation to clergy of many denominations being regularly invited to preach.

Her Majesty The Queen attended the sixtieth anniversary service of the dedication of the chapel in July 2013, accompanied by Prince Edward, The Earl of Wessex. The Sovereign's Standard of The Blues and Royals was laid up in The Robin Chapel on 4 October 2015, at a special service to mark the occasion.

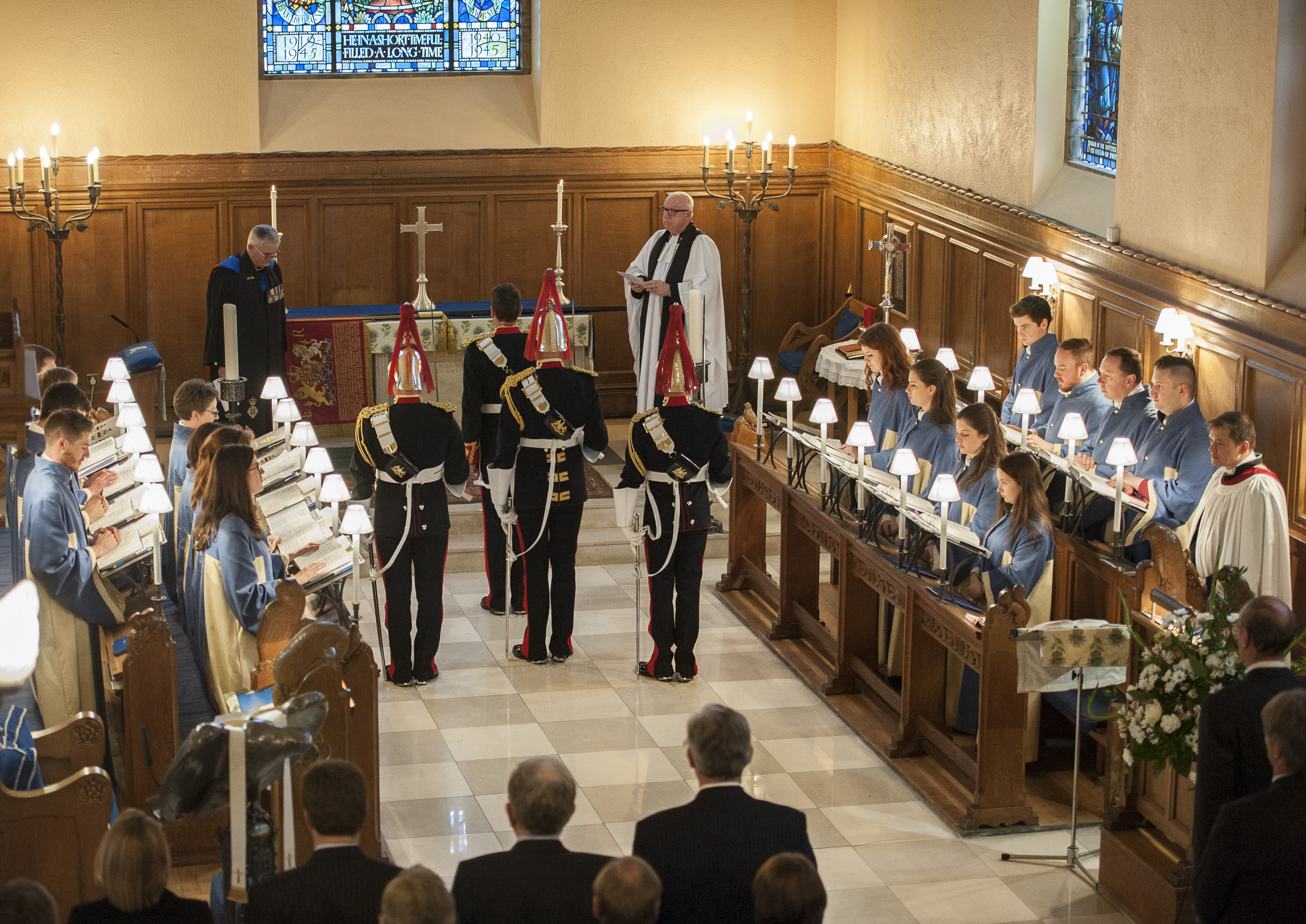
"Laying Up" service

== See also ==
- List of Category A listed buildings in Edinburgh
- List of post-war Category A listed buildings in Scotland
