= Hugh Cunningham of Bonnington =

Scottish merchant

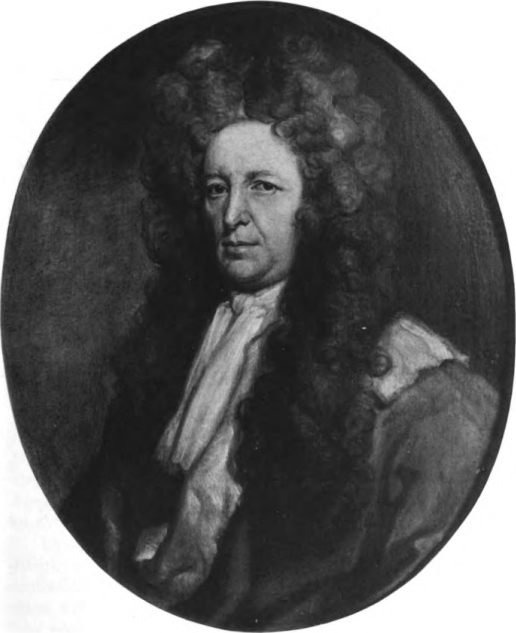
Sir Hew Cunninghame, Lord Provost of Edinburgh

Sir Hugh Cunningham of Bonnington (1642–1710) was a 17th-century Scottish merchant who served as Lord Provost of Edinburgh from 1702 to 1704.

== Life ==
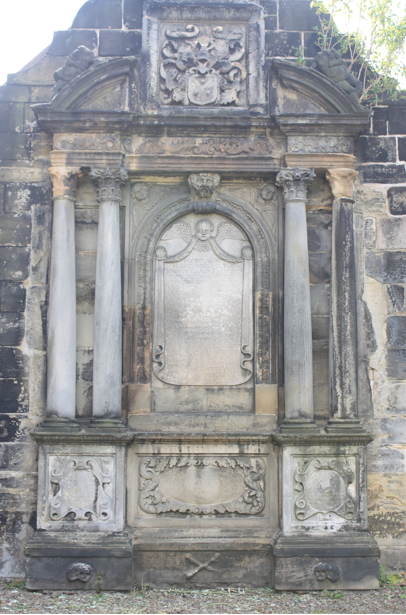
The grave of Hugh Cunningham of Bonnington, Greyfriars Kirkyard

He was the son of Hugh Cunningham of Craigend House near Stow, a descendant of William Cunninghame of Craigends.

In February 1675 he was made Lord Dean of Guild in Edinburgh. In 1689 he was made Master Of Paul's Work, a building where Waverley Station now stands.

In 1692 he became a burgess on Edinburgh Town Council. In 1694 he loaned the city £4000 and was made Water Baillie of Leith and a burgess of Canongate.

In 1700 he became Master of the Merchant Company in Edinburgh.

He is termed Hugh Cunningham of Bonnington, having purchased Bonnington House near Ratho around 1700 from the Scott family.

In 1704 he is termed "Hugh Cunningham of Craigend" and had therefore presumably inherited Craigend House from his father. He purchased a burial plot in Greyfriars Kirkyard in the same year, probably to bury his father.

He died on 16 December 1710 aged 68, and was buried in Greyfriars Kirkyard in Edinburgh. The grave closes the vista of the sealed section commonly known as the Coventanters Prison.

== Family ==
In 1681 he married Anna Moncrieff in Edinburgh. Their children included Anna (b.1682), Alexander (b.1685), Catherine (b.1690), Hew (b.1693), Matthew (b.1697).

His daughters Margaret and Catherine were obliged in his will to endow "from time to time" place to a poor girl with the surname "Cunningham" in the Merchant Maiden Hospital.

Alexander Cunningham inherited Bonnington House and Craigend House.

Catherine married George Smollet of Bonhill.

== Artistic recognition ==
He was portrayed by Sir John Baptist Medina around 1700.
