= Bonnington House =

19th-century country house in Scotland

Coordinates: 55.9068°N 3.4228°W

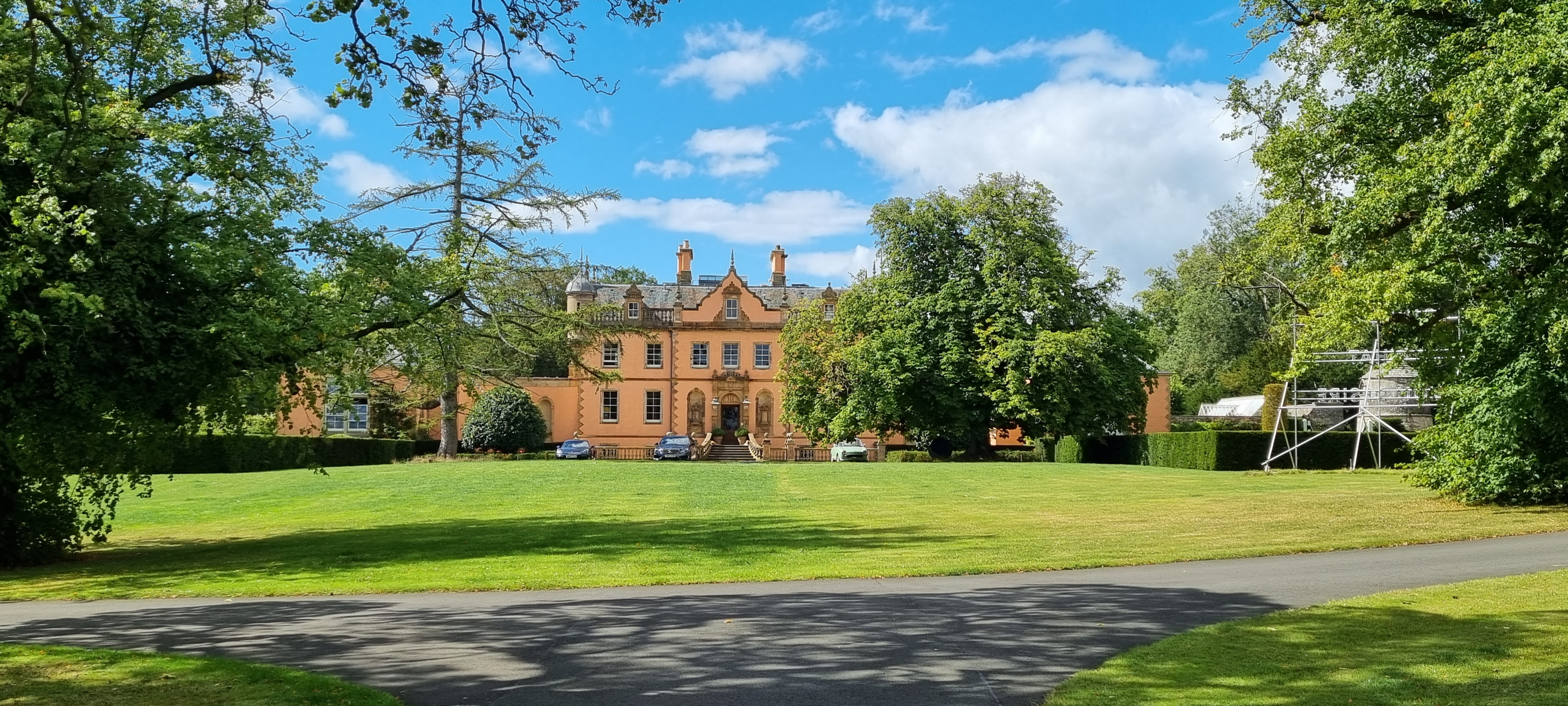
Bonnington House, Jupiter Artland, Edinburgh

Bonnington House is a 17th-century country house near Wilkieston, around 16 kilometres (9.9 mi) west of the city centre of Edinburgh, Scotland. It is a category A listed building.

The house was built in 1622, and was the home of the Foulis Baronets of Colinton. Sir James Foulis, 2nd Baronet, served as Lord Justice Clerk from 1684 to 1688, taking the title Lord Colinton. Bonnington later passed to the Wilkies of Ormiston.

The house passed from the Scott family to Hugh Cunningham, Lord Provost of Edinburgh around 1702. It is said to have been doubled in size c.1720. In 1720 the house was owned by Hugh's son, Alexander Cunningham.

In 1858 the house was completely remodelled in a Jacobean style. The house and its 100-acre (40 ha) estate was bought by the present owners in 1999, and in 2001 the house was refurbished by Lee Boyd Architects. Two new wings were designed by Benjamin Tindall Architects, granted planning consent in 2010 and completed in 2015. The grounds of the house have been developed as a sculpture park, now open to the public as Jupiter Artland.
