= Thomas Clouston =

Scottish psychiatrist

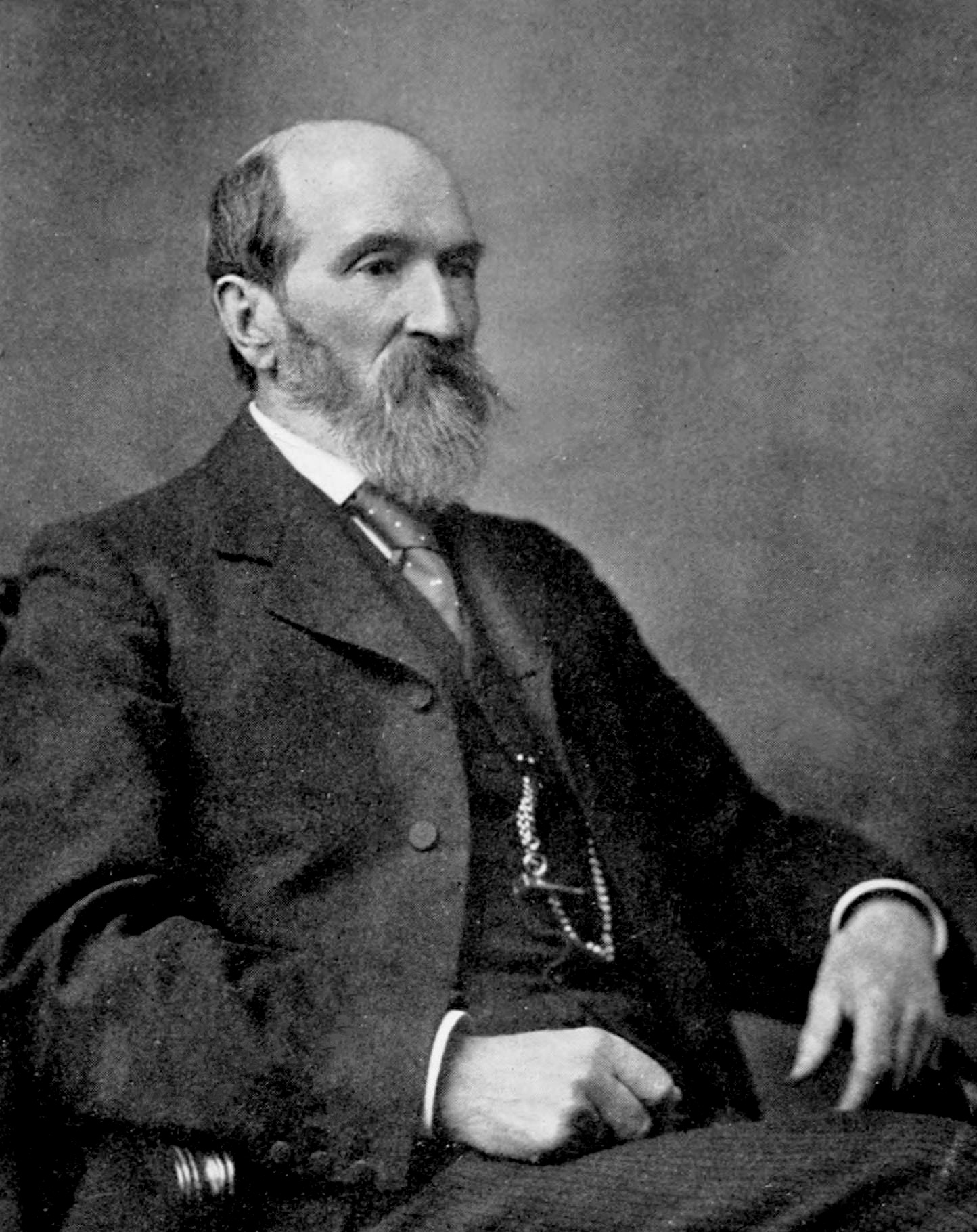
Thomas Clouston

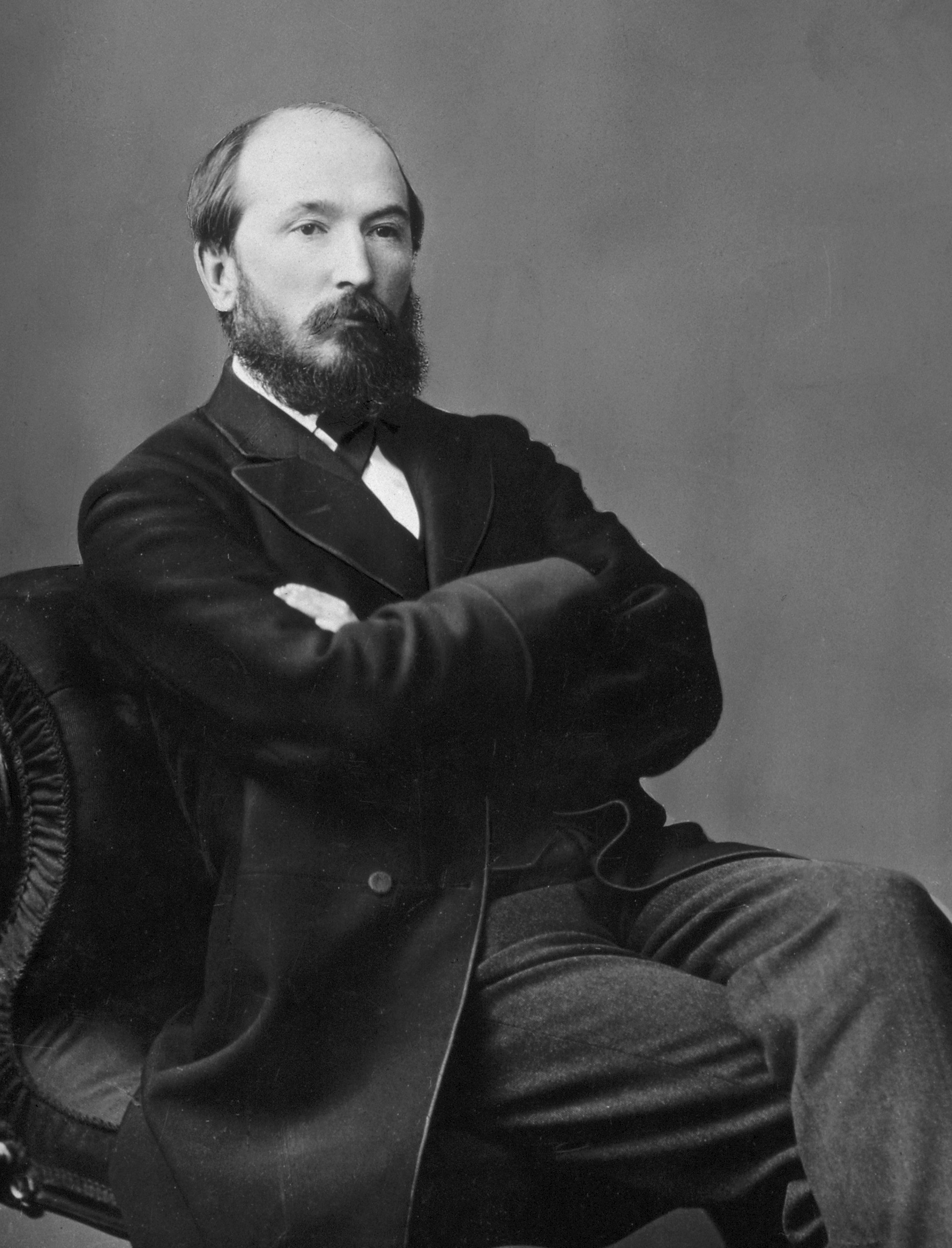
Thomas Clouston

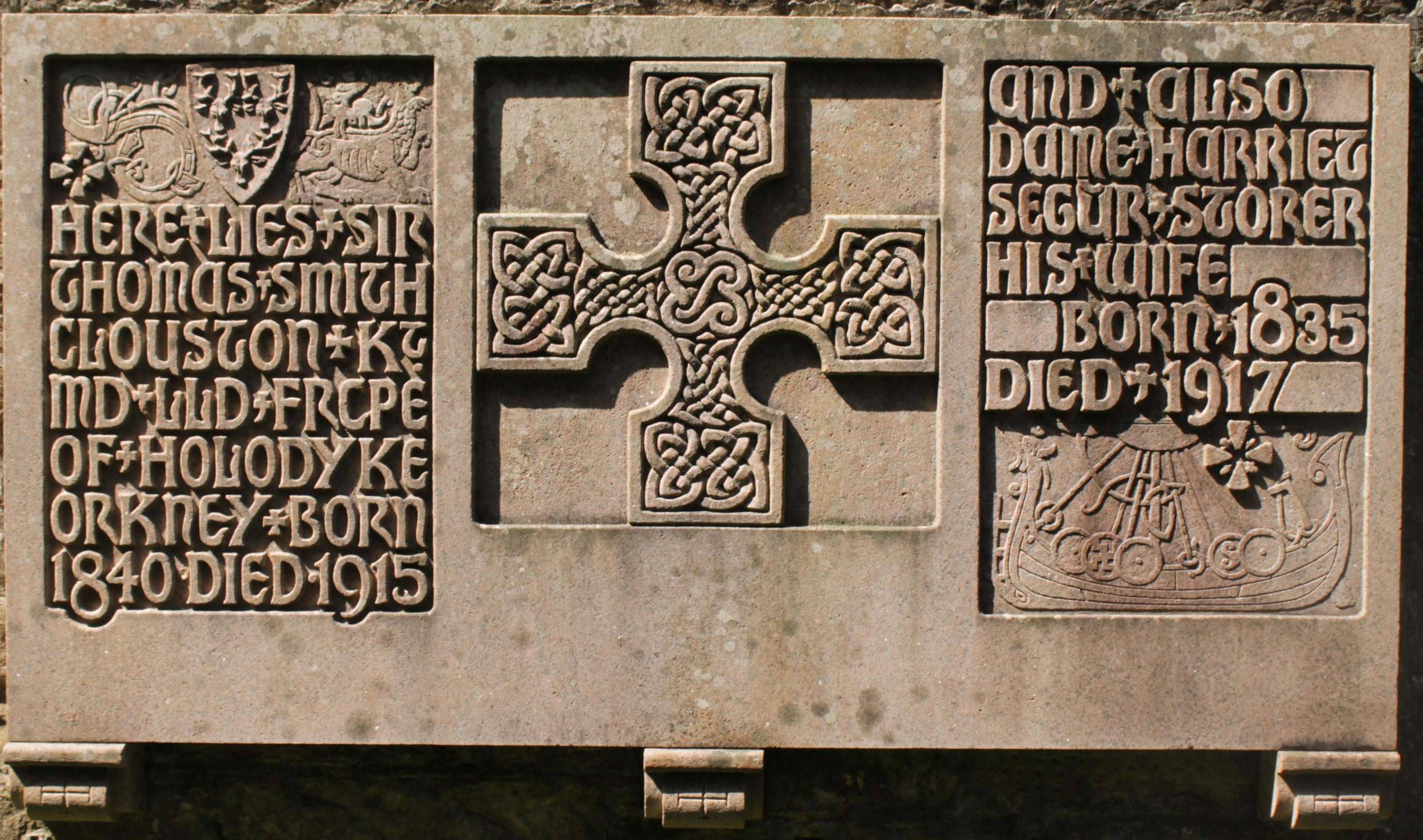
The grave of Thomas Clouston, Dean Cemetery

Sir Thomas Smith Clouston FRSE PRCPE (22 April 1840 – 19 April 1915) was a Scottish psychiatrist.

== Life ==
Clouston was the youngest of four sons of Robert Clouston (1786–1857) 3rd of Nisthouse, in the Birsay parish of Orkney, and his wife Janet (née Smith). The Cloustons descend from Havard Gunnason (fl. 1090), Chief Counsellor to Haakon, Earl of Orkney, and later became landed gentry taking their name from their estate, Clouston.

Clouston was educated at Aberdeen Grammar School and the University of Edinburgh. Clouston qualified M.D.(Edinburgh) with a thesis on the nervous system of the lobster, supervised by John Goodsir.

His early interest in insanity resulted in an apprenticeship with David Skae, the eminent Superintendent of the Royal Edinburgh Asylum. In 1863, Clouston was appointed superintendent of the Cumberland and Westmoreland Asylum (Garlands Hospital) in Carlisle; and in 1873, in succession to Skae, Superintendent of the new Royal Edinburgh Asylum, which had been set up under new principles laid down by the then Commissioner to the Scottish Health Board, Sir James Coxe . In 1879, after having lectured for some years in conjunction with the Professor of the Practice of Physic Thomas Laycock, Clouston was appointed as the first ever Lecturer on Mental Diseases in the University of Edinburgh, a post which he held in conjunction with his position at the Royal Edinburgh Asylum. Clouston became a celebrated lecturer with an international reputation for his exposition of the psychiatric disorders of adolescence. Clouston published extensively, beginning with his remarkable Clinical Lectures on Mental Diseases (1883), followed, much later, by his more popular work Unsoundness of Mind (1911). Another book aimed at the general public was entitled Morals and The Brain; and he remained an unreconstructed believer in "masturbational insanity" and an uncompromising advocate of teetotalism in opposition to his exact contemporary, the psychiatrist James Crichton-Browne. In 1888, Clouston served as President of the Medico-Psychological Association.

In 1874 Clouston was elected a member of the Harveian Society of Edinburgh and served as president in 1908. In 1875 he was elected a Fellow of the Royal Society of Edinburgh, his proposers were Sir Joseph Lister, 1st Baron Lister, John Hutton Balfour, Sir William Turner and Alexander Crum Brown. In 1881 he was elected a member of the Aesculapian Club.

In 1894 he opened the Craig House extension to the Royal Edinburgh asylum on Easter Craiglockhart Hill, which was renamed the Thomas Clouston Clinic in 1972. The buildings later became part of Napier University. From 1902 to 1904 he was President of the Royal College of Physicians of Edinburgh.

Clouston retired in 1908 and was knighted in 1911. He is commemorated by a brass plaque on the eastern aspect of the north transept of St Magnus Cathedral in Kirkwall. His son was the author Storer Clouston. He received the Freedom of the Burgh of Kirkwall on 28 August 1908.

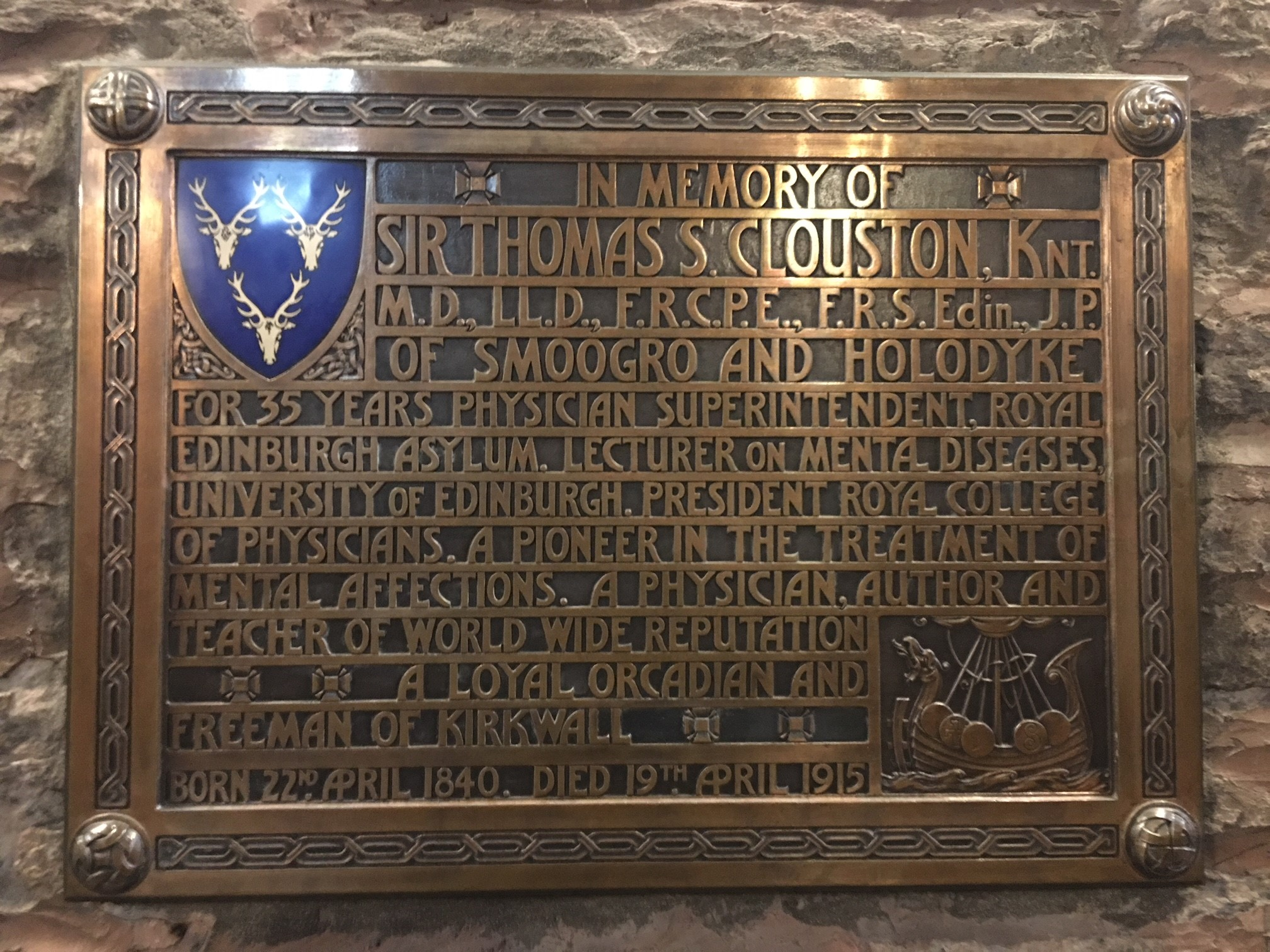
Thomas Clouston memorial in Kirkwall Cathedral, Orkney

At the end of his life Clouston lived at 26 Heriot Row, an elegant and substantial Georgian townhouse in Edinburgh's New Town.

He died in Edinburgh on 19 April 1915. He is buried in Dean Cemetery in Edinburgh with his wife Dame Harriet Secur Storer (1835–1917). The grave lies on the obscured southern terrace. His daughter, Augusta Maud Clouston CBE (1871–1960) lies to the side, with her husband Sir David Wallace (1862–1952).

== Artistic recognition ==
His sketch portrait of 1884, by William Brassey Hole, shown arm-in arm with Douglas Argyll Robertson, is held by the Scottish National Portrait Gallery.

== Publications ==
- Clinical Lectures on Mental Diseases
- The Neuroses of Development
- The Hygiene of Mind
- Unsoundness of Mind

Academic offices
Preceded by Thomas Richard Fraser	President of the Royal College of Physicians of Edinburgh; 1902–1904	Succeeded by John Playfair
