= John Ross McKay =

Scottish architect

John Ross McKay RIBA (1884–1962) was a 20th-century Scottish architect. He was also President of the Clan MacKay Society. He gives his name to the J R McKay Medal for architectural students.

His work covers a diverse range: from villas to major factories and department stores. He was also responsible for several cinemas and public houses.

== Early life ==
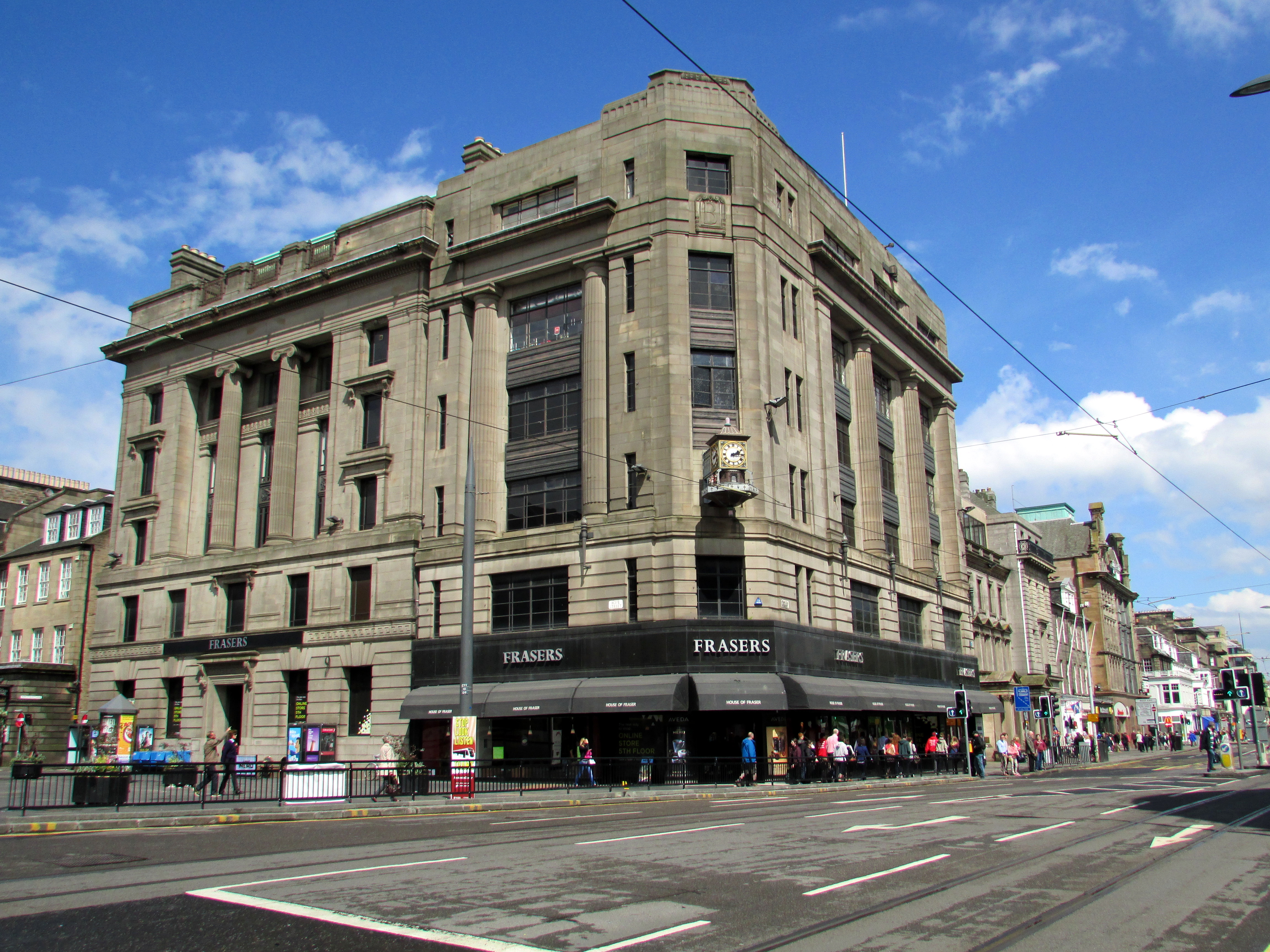
Former House of Fraser Department Store, Princes Street, Edinburgh, now the Johnnie Walker Experience

He was born in Edinburgh on 11 June 1884 the son of William McKay and his wife Elizabeth Anderson. He was apprenticed as an architect in 1899 also studying at Edinburgh School of Applied Art and Heriot-Watt College.

== Career ==
In 1903 he joined the office of Francis William Deas and, after gaining his Diploma in 1905, in 1906 he became a junior architect in the office of Robert Lorimer at 49 Queen Street, Edinburgh.

He served in the First World War from 1917 to 1919: both at VIII Corps headquarters and in the Royal Scots Fusiliers (Labour Corps) as a lieutenant in France but mainly involved in military mapping and creating panoramas for planning purposes. In 1920 he returned to Lorimer's office as "chief assistant". His employment with Lorimer ended somewhat abruptly when he informed Lorimer that he had been invited to stay at Hunterston House, as a guest of his former commanding officer, General Aylmer Hunter-Weston. Lorimer had an issue with this as the general was a current client, and he felt an assistant should not attend where he himself had not been invited. Lorimer failed to acknowledge that this was not the reason for invitation. McKay ignored Lorimer's warnings and attended the function. Lorimer fired him on his return.

Soon after leaving Lorimer he went into partnership with James Smith Richardson in his office at 4 Melville Street. However, Richardson more or less left all architectural work to McKay, as he had been appointed a full time Inspector for the Ancient Monuments Directorate.

From 1930 McKay was Vice President of the Edinburgh Architectural Association. In the Second World War, other than designing some emergency hospitals, and military HQs all work dried up. In 1942 Richardson officially left the partnership and Mckay was instead joined by Walker Todd, but this was short-lived as Walker Todd died in 1944.

Suffering from mental illness, his final years were spent in Craig House, Edinburgh, a private asylum. He died there on 2 August 1962.

== Family ==
He was married to Dora Kennedy.

== Main projects ==
- Villa, 4 Grant Avenue, Colinton (1913)
- Factory for George F. Merson, Edinburgh (1920)
- C & J Brown premises, Edinburgh (1920)
- Douglas & Foulis printworks, Edinburgh (1920)
- Mayfield Garage, Mayfield, Edinburgh (1920)
- West Acres, Balerno (1920)
- Lochote House, Linlithgow (1921)
- New wing, Belhaven House, near Dunbar (1922)
- Caley Picture House, Tollcross, Edinburgh (1922)
- Hillend Farmhouse, south of Edinburgh (1922)
- Oldfields, North Berwick (1923)
- St Ninian's Church, Leith (1923)
- Belton (villa) in Gullane (1924)
- New frontage, 67-81 Shandwick Place, Edinburgh (1924)
- Gate Lodge, Saughton Cemetery (1924)
- Nungate, North Berwick (1924)
- The Gatehouse, North Berwick (1924)
- Auchindoune, Liberton, Edinburgh (1925)
- Garage for Bruce Lindsay & Co, St Leonards, Edinburgh (1925)
- Kinleith Mill near Currie (1925)
- Ravelrig House, Balerno (1925)
- 16 Brights Crescent, Edinburgh (1926)
- Blanerne, North Berwick (1926)
- Edinburgh Cat and Dog Home (1926)
- Carlton Cinema, Edinburgh (1927)
- Corstorphine Hill Cemetery (1927)
- Tigh na Coille, Fearnan, Loch Tay (1927)
- MacAndrews, Edinburgh (1928)
- Ravensworth, Colinton (1928)
- Dornock Mill, Crieff (1929)
- West Mills, Colinton (1929)
- Garage for G C MacAndrew, Edinburgh (1930)
- 49/51 High Street, Tranent (1932)
- Aithernie, Davidsons Mains (1932)
- House for Miss W D Renwick, Peebles (1932)
- House for William Thynne, Aberlady (1932)
- Nicolson Street Church, rebuilding all except frontage after a fire (1932) now Southside Community Centre
- 3 to 21 Kenmure Avenue, Duddingston (1933)
- House for W A Scott Douglas ("Solsgirth"), Gullane (1933)
- Office bloch, Roseburn Terrace/Russell Road, Edinburgh (1933)
- Tea rooms at Loch Striven (1933)
- Victoria Hotel, Bamburgh (1933), a traditional design
- 7 Craigmillar Park, Edinburgh (1933)
- Castlekemp House, North Berwick (1933)
- "Industrial Bar", Edinburgh (1934)
- "Moat Bar", Moat Place, Edinburgh (1934)
- National Bank, Inverkeithing (1934)
- Factory for Morton Sundour Fabrics, Carlisle (1935)
- Riddell Mill, Roxburgh (1935)
- Thomson & Norris Factory at Turnhouse near Edinburgh (1935)
- 12 Mortonhall Road, Edinburgh (1935)
- Department store, Princes Street/Hope Street (1935) converted into the Johnnie Walker Experience in 2021
- "Motor Bar", 133 Lothian Road, Edinburgh (1935)
- Daimler showroom, 14-16 Shandwick Place, Edinburgh (1936)
- Binns Furniture Repository, Edinburgh (1936)
- Carfraemill Hotel, Oxton, Scottish Borders (1936)
- Harp Hotel, Corstorphine (1936)
- Lorrisden House, Midlothian (1936)
- "Powderhall Arms", Edinburgh (1936)
- SMT garages and offices, Edinburgh (1936)
- SMT garages at Carlisle (1936)
- SMT garages at Airdrie (1936)
- 11 Church Hill in Edinburgh (1937)
- 138 Constitution Street, Leith (1937)
- 55-59 High Street, Tranent (1937)
- 7 St Margarets Road, Edinburgh (1937)
- 9/11 Hope Street (off Charlotte Square, Edinburgh (1937)
- Cloverhill, Broughton, Scottish Borders (1937)
- Craigend, North Berwick (1937)
- House for W N Murphy, Craiglockhart (1937)
- Playhouse Cinema, North Berwick (1937)
- Public House, 127-132 High Street, Royal Mile, Edinburgh (1937)
- 20 Mansionhouse Road, Edinburgh (1938)
- Flats at Falcon Avenue, Morningside, Edinburgh (1938)
- "Haymarket Bar", Edinburgh (1938)
- House for Mrs Stevenson, Gullane (1938)
- McVitie's Bakery, Edinburgh (1938)
- Premises for Croall & Son, Edinburgh (1938)
- Riverside block, Quayside Mills, Leith demolished 1990
- Regal Cinema, Shotts (1938)
- Flats at Falcon Park, Morningside, Edinburgh (1938)
- Territorial Army Drill Hall, Firrhill, Edinburgh (1939)
- Garage at Falconhall, Edinburgh (1939)
- 52nd Searchlight Regiment HQ, Edinburgh (1939)
- Emergency Military Hospital, Bellsdyke Hospital, Larbert (1939)
- Emergency Military Hospital, Clovenfords (1939)
- Factory for British Vacuum Cleaner Co, Broxburn (1947)
- Factory for Telegraph Condenser Co., Bathgate (1947)
- 8 St Andrew Square, Edinburgh (1954) demolished 2015
