= James Coxe =

Scottish psychiatrist

Sir James Coxe MD FRSE (1811 – 1878) was a Scottish physician and expert on psychiatry. Controversially (though not at the time) he linked mental illness with a distancing from religion and with a parallel deterioration of the body. Rather more productively, he was an early campaigner against restraint in asylums, and he advocated greater training of women in the field of medicine.

== Life ==
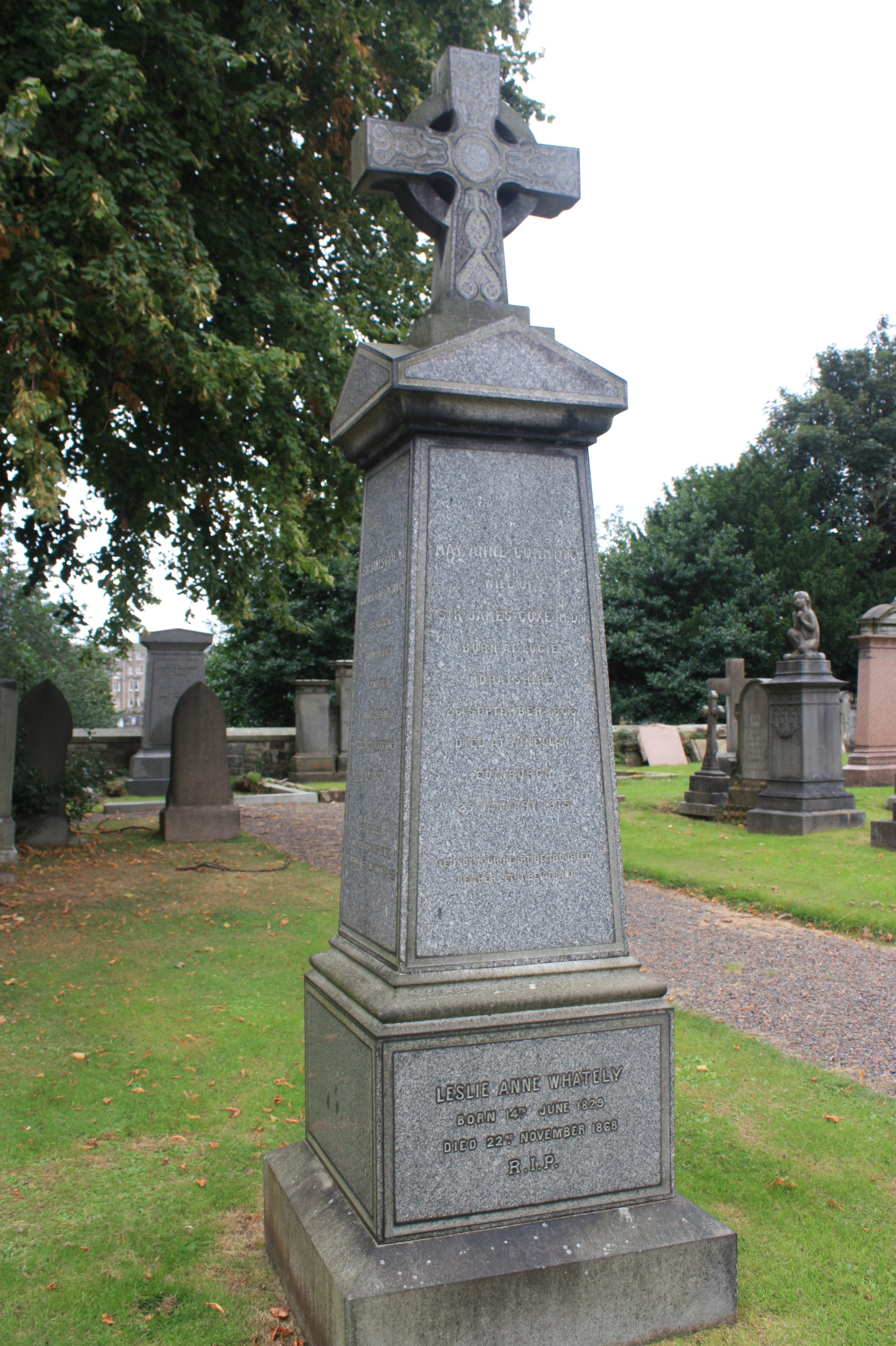
The grave of Sir James Coxe, Dean Cemetery, Edinburgh

James Coxe is said to have been born in Gorgie, Edinburgh the son of Robert Coxe, but the family name does not appear in any Edinburgh Post Office Directory for that period.. He was the nephew of Dr. Andrew Combe, the Edinburgh physician and phrenologist.

Coxe studied medicine at Göttingen and Heidelberg universities, and then returned to Edinburgh for his medical degree (MD) which was granted in 1835.

From 1857 until his death he was a Commissioner in Lunacy for Scotland; and he sat on a Royal Commission on the Management of the Insane. This led to the rebuilding of Craig House, Edinburgh under the direction of Dr Thomas Clouston and Sir Arthur Mitchell.

Coxe was elected a Fellow of the Royal Society of Edinburgh in 1854, his proposer being Robert Chambers.

Coxe was knighted by Queen Victoria in 1863. In 1872 he was elected President of the Psychological Association in Great Britain. In 1877 he co-chaired an inquiry into "The Care and Cure of the Insane" jointly with Dr Joseph Mortimer at the request of The Lancet.

In his final years in Edinburgh he lived in Kinellan House in Murrayfield. Coxe died in Folkestone in Kent on 9 May 1878.

He is buried in Dean Cemetery in western Edinburgh with his wife, May Anne Cumming. The distinctive granite monument stands on the corner of one of the small southern sections.

== Publications ==
- On the Causes of Insanity and the Means of Checking its Growth (1872)
- Lunacy in its Relations to the State (1878)
