= Marguerite Wood =

British historian and archivist

- Born: 30 August 1887
- Died: 19 August 1954 (aged 66)
- Education: University of Edinburgh
- Occupations: Historian and Archivist

Marguerite Wood (30 August 1887 – 19 August 1954) was a Scottish historian and archivist who specialised in Scottish history. She served as Keeper of the Burgh Records of Edinburgh and was a Fellow of the Royal Historical Society and a member of the Scottish Records Advisory Council.

== Early life and education ==
Marguerite Wood was born in Edinburgh on 30 August 1887, the third child of John Philp Wood and Margaret Ellinor Tennant. Her family had a strong interest in history: her great-grandfather John Philip Wood (1762–1838) published a history of Cramond and her paternal grandfather John George Wood (1804–65), was a member of an antiquarian society, the Spalding Club. Her maternal grandfather was Hugh Lyon Tennent a founding member of the Edinburgh Calotype Club. She was educated at St George’s School for Girls in Edinburgh.

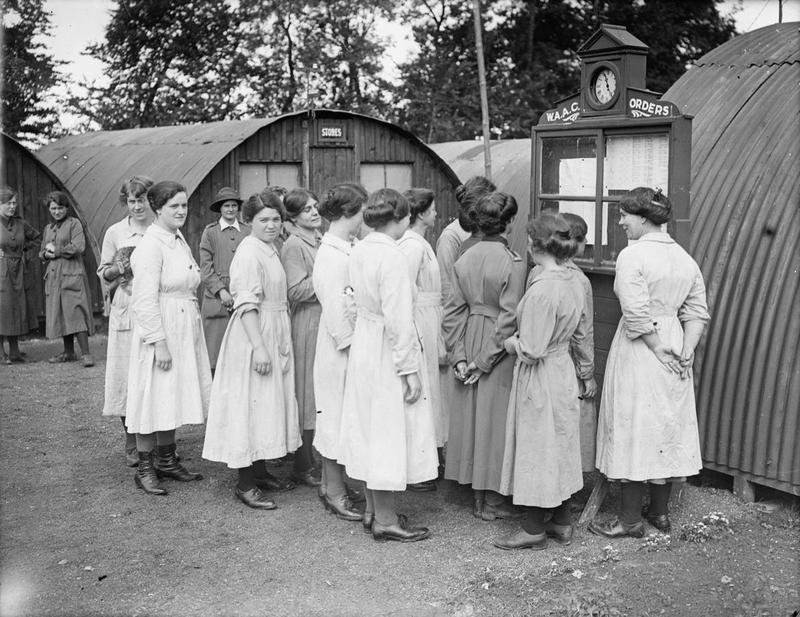
The Women's Army Auxiliary Corps during the First World War, France

Wood studied French at the University of Edinburgh, gaining a master's degree in 1913. During the First World War, she served in the Women's Army Auxiliary Core (which became known as Queen Mary's Army Auxiliary Corp in 1918) in France. The actual dates of her service are not known, although there is some speculation that she may have joined following the death of her only brother at the Battle of Passchendaele in 1917 and she had returned to Edinburgh by 1920. At that time she resumed her historical studies under the supervision of Professor R. K. Hannay. This culminated in a two-volume edition of the foreign correspondence of Marie de Lorraine, mother of Mary, Queen of Scots, for which she was awarded a Ph.D. from the University of Edinburgh in 1925. This was an unusual achievement for a woman: only four women were awarded the Ph.D. in History from the University of Edinburgh prior to the Second World War. Following the publication of the work by the Scottish History Society, G. P. Insh, in his review, noted the value of her scholarship in situating 16th-century Scottish history within its European context.

== Professional career ==
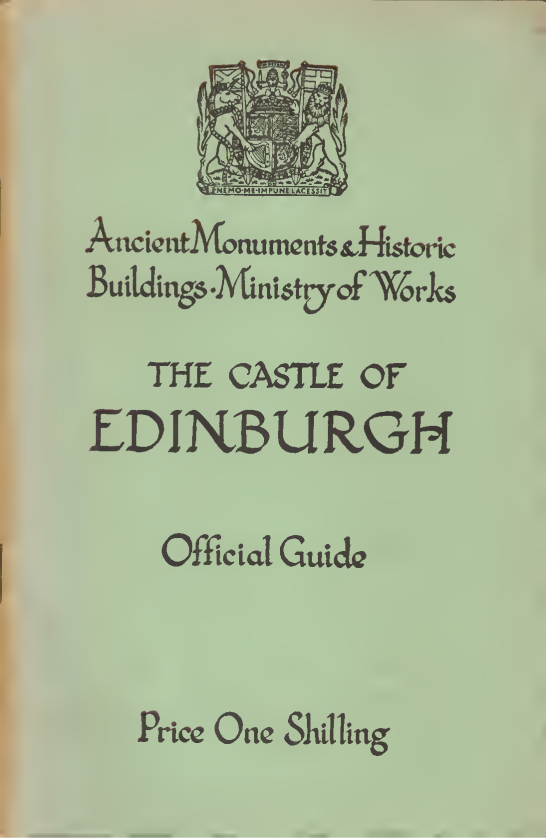
Edinburgh Castle Official Guide Second Edition

After completing her Ph.D., she was appointed to the Edinburgh Town Clerk's office, where she contributed to the Extracts from the Records of the Burgh of Edinburgh 1589–1603 by A. Grierson, published in 1927. She then became the Keeper of the Burgh Records of Edinburgh (now Edinburgh City Archives), continuing in this role until 1954.

During the summer of 1937 she "had the privilege of assisting Miss Grant [Isabel Frances Grant, founder of the Highland Folk Museum] in Am Fasgadh".

The 1920s–30s was also a significant period in the development of Scottish archaeology and saw the publication of the first authoritative guidebooks to national heritage sites. James Richardson, Scotland's first Inspector of Ancient Monuments, invited Marguerite Wood to coauthor the first guidebook, to Edinburgh Castle, in 1929. Their collaboration proved successful, and they went on to develop guidebooks on Melrose Abbey and Dryburgh Abbey in 1932.

== Honours ==
Wood was both a Member of the Scottish Records Advisory Council and a Fellow of the Royal Historical Society.

== Selected publications ==
- Foreign correspondence with Marie de Lorraine, Queen of Scotland, Balcarres Papers, 2 vols (Edinburgh: Scottish History Society, 1923 & 1925).
- "Domestic Affairs of the Burgh, 1554-1589", Book of the Old Edinburgh Club, 15 (Edinburgh, 1927).
- "The Imprisonment of the Earl of Arran", Scottish Historical Review, 24:94 (January 1927), pp. 116–122.
- (with David Robertson), Castle and Town: Chapters in the History of the Royal Burgh of Edinburgh (Edinburgh, 1928).
- Extracts from the Records of the Burgh of Edinburgh 1604-1626 (Edinburgh: Oliver and Boyd, 1931).
- (with Jane Harvey McMaster), Historical Manuscripts Commission Supplementary report on the manuscripts of the Duke of Hamilton (London, 1932).
- Flodden Papers: Diplomatic Correspondence between the Courts of France and Scotland : 1507–1517 (Edinburgh: Scottish History Society, 1933).
- "Hammermen of the Canongate", Book of Old Edinburgh Club, 19, (Edinburgh, 1933), pp. 1–30.
- Book of Records of the Ancient Privileges of the Canongate (Edinburgh: Scottish Record Society, 1955) Scottish Record Society (Ser.) vol. 85.
- Richardson, J. S., and Marguerite Wood. Edinburgh Castle (Edinburgh: HMSO, 1929) Second Edition 1948
- The Scott Monument : Edinburgh. (Edinburgh: Edinburgh Corporation, 1949).
- Richardson, J. S., and Marguerite Wood. Melrose Abbey, Roxburghshire (Edinburgh: HMSO, 1932). Second Edition 1949
- Richardson, J. S., Marguerite Wood, Dryburgh Abbey, Berwickshire (Edinburgh: HMSO, 1932).
- Richardson, J. S., and Marguerite Wood, Dryburgh Abbey, Berwickshire. Edinburgh: HMSO, 1937). Second Edition 1948
