= Craiglockhart Castle =

Ruin in Scotland

- Edinburgh, Scotland
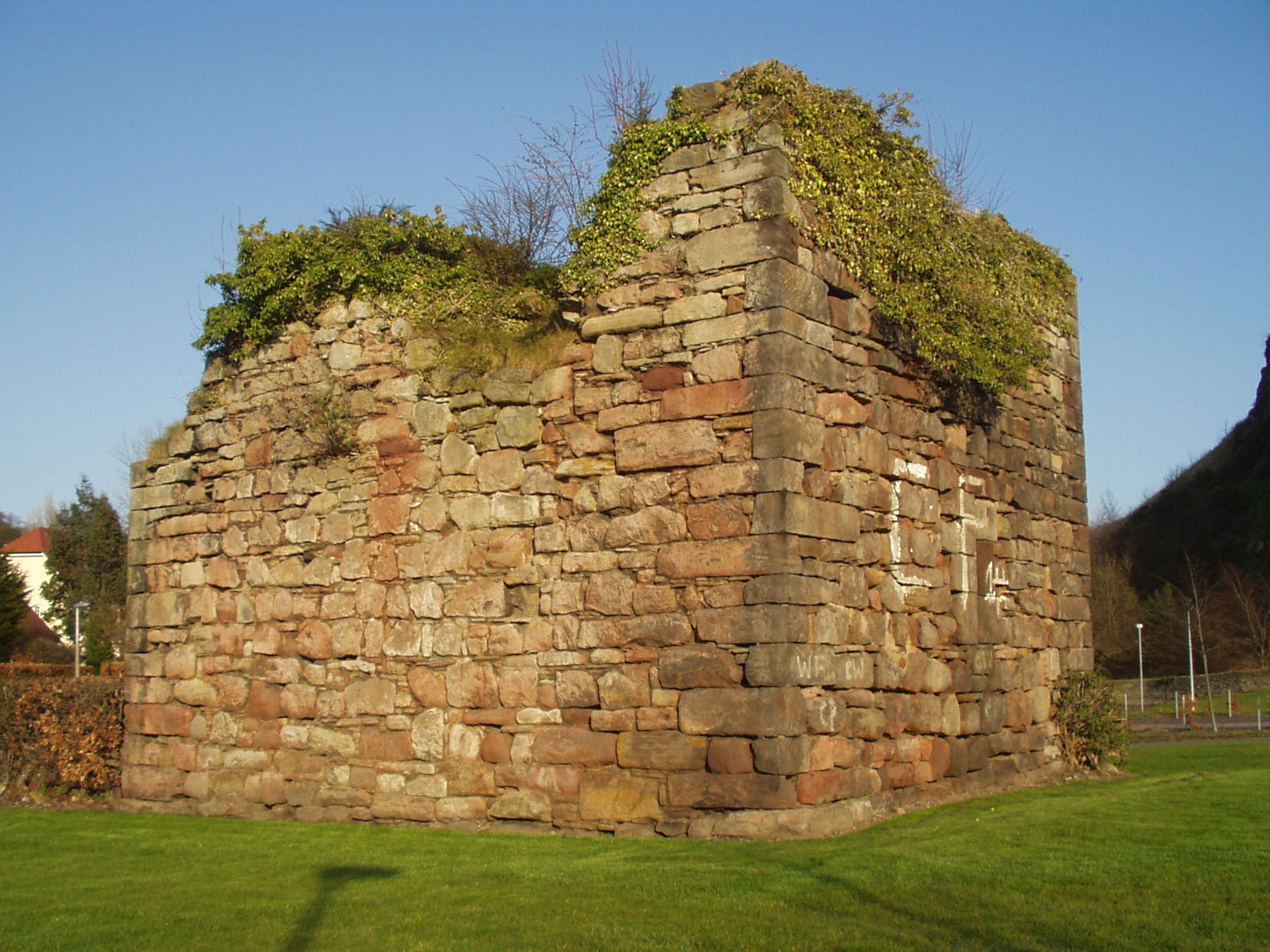
- Craiglockhart Castle

Site information
- Controlled by

Scheduled monument
- Official name: Craiglockhart Castle
- Designated: 8 May 1935
- Reference no.: SM1198

Location
- Coordinates: 55.9193354°N 3.2383128°W

Site history
- Built: 15th century

Craiglockhart Castle is a ruined tower house in the Craiglockhart district of Edinburgh, Scotland.

== Background ==
It is situated in the Craiglockhart Campus of Edinburgh Napier University, to the north of Wester Craiglockhart Hill. Historic Scotland said that the tower was built by the Lockharts of Lee in the 15th century, and other sources state that it was the work of the Kincaid family during the 12th century. It was originally four storeys high, of which only the first and part of the second storey remain. The tower measures 8.7 by 7.5 metres (29 by 25 ft), and the walls are 1.5 metres (4 ft 11 in) thick.

The ruin is protected as a scheduled monument.
