= James Smith Richardson =

Scottish architect, antiquarian and archaeologist

James Smith Richardson FSA Scot
- Richardson in his retirement years
- Born: 2 November 1883; Edinburgh, Scotland
- Died: 12 September 1970 (aged 86); North Berwick, East Lothian, Scotland
- Occupations: Architect, antiquarian and archaeologist
- Employer: Ministry of Works
- Known for: First Inspector of Ancient Monuments for Scotland
- Notable work: A series of guide-books to ancient monuments in Scotland
- Spouse: Frances Margaret Douglas

James Smith Richardson FSA Scot (1883–1970) was a Scottish architect, antiquarian and archaeologist. He was the first Inspector of Ancient Monuments for Scotland, and was responsible for a series of popular guidebooks to monuments in public care.

== Early life and education ==
J.S. (Jamie) Richardson was born in Edinburgh on 2 November 1883 to Dr James T Richardson of North Berwick and his wife Christina Thomson. The family moved to North Berwick in 1887, where Richardson attended first the Abbey School and then North Berwick High School. Richardson developed an early interest in archaeology in which he was encouraged by his father – both near to home and on foreign holidays.

Richardson was articled to the Edinburgh architect James Macintyre Henry from 1899–1903, and during this time studied at the School of Applied Art (now part of the Edinburgh College of Art). In 1902 he produced his first publication, co-authored with his father, Prehistoric remains near Gulllane. In 1903 he joined the office of Robert Lorimer as an assistant, and in 1906 he travelled south to study English church woodwork with Aymer Vallance.

== Professional life and war-time service ==
Richardson set up his own practise in Edinburgh in 1909. His first notable work was in North Berwick, the angel screen of the south apse of St Baldred Episcopal Church (1909). He was then responsible for the restoration of the ruined church of St Moluag, Teampall Mholuaidh, at Eoropie on the Isle of Lewis. In 1912 he was elected a fellow of the Society of Antiquaries in Scotland and in March 1914 was appointed inspector of Ancient Monuments in Scotland, this being at the time a part-time position.

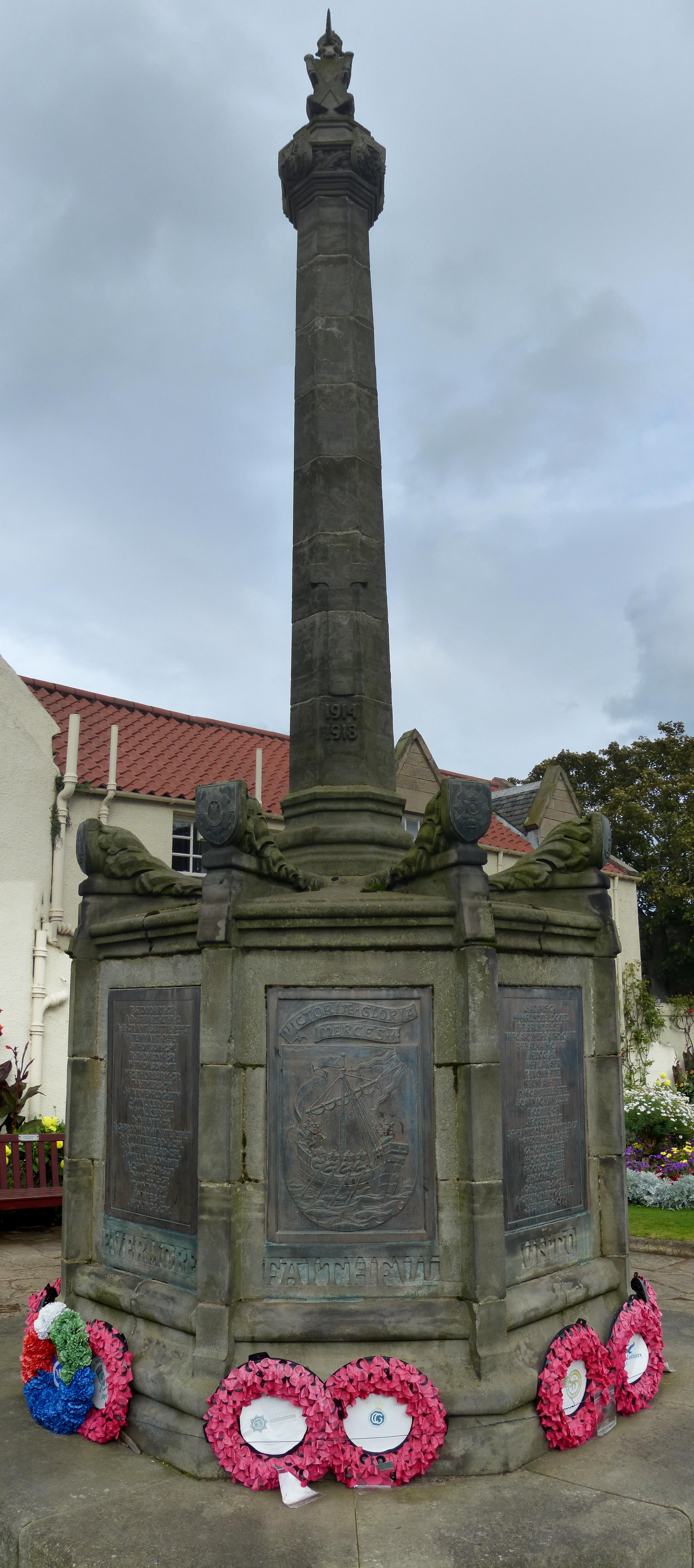
The North Berwick War Memorial

On the outbreak of war, the practise closed, and Richardson volunteered for military service and joined the Royal Scots, with whom he had been a volunteer since 1909. His duties were in draft and training, and he spent most of the war in Britain, with time at the front in 1915 and 1918. He did not forget archaeology during this period, and sent some late-Celtic pottery, found in the trenches in France, to the National Museum in Scotland.

Richardson's architectural practise resumed in 1919, and the next year John Ross McKay, became a partner. McKay had studied at the School of Applied Art at the same time as Richardson, and had also worked in Lorimer's office. Richardson's position as Inspector of Ancient Monuments became full-time in 1920, and in 1922 he became a part-time lecturer in the Edinburgh College of Art, which had assimilated the School of Applied Art. This left him little time for architectural work, and while Richardson remained a partner, and was able to attract clients through his official position, McKay did most of the practical work. Post-war work by the practice included the North Berwick War Memorial (1920) and the restoration of a fountain in Linlithgow Palace.

Richardson and McKay came into conflict with their old boss, Lorimer, over the latter's proposed design for the Scottish National War Memorial. Richardson, as secretary of the Ancient Monuments Board, opposed the design, and was able to defeat the scheme partly by erecting a canvas mock-up of the memorial. Lorimer thought the mock-up gave no idea of what the final work would look like, and described Richardson as an "irresponsible devil".

During the next two decades, he travelled throughout Scotland, inspecting and cataloguing ancient remains, and in many cases making arrangements to take privately owned monuments into public care - in all over 90. Monuments included cairns and stone circles; churches; grave slabs; castles; a water-mill; and wall paintings. Monuments were stabilised and in many cases cleared and laid out for public viewing, and guide-books published for many of the sites (see below). As well as preserving and presenting ancient monuments, Richardson planned and designed the Museum in the Commendator's House at Melrose Abbey. Richardson was also involved in scheduling ancient monuments, enabling the protection of sites that were not in public ownership

Richardson carried out a number of archaeological excavations, both of monuments in public care and of other sites. In North Berwick, he discovered many mediaeval floor tiles in a tile-kiln associated with the Cistercian Nunnery. In 1932 he excavated a cairn near Kalemouth, Roxburghshire. This was not published until 1951. Other investigations included The Broch of Gurness and at Jarlshof, Shetland.

Richardson withdrew from architectural practice in 1942, gave up teaching at the Edinburgh College of Art in 1946, and retired from his position as Inspector of Ancient Monuments in 1948. He continued to be involved in archeological and antiquarian activities. He gave a series of lectures on The Mediaeval stone carver in Scotland (not published until 1964), was involved in the establishment of the Burgh Museum in North Berwick (opened in 1957) and was often consulted on restorations, in particular by the Queen Mother regarding the Castle of Mey and the garden at Pitmmedden for the National Trust.

He suffered a major heart attack in 1969, and died, in North Berwick on 12 September 1970 at the age of 86.

== Guidebooks ==
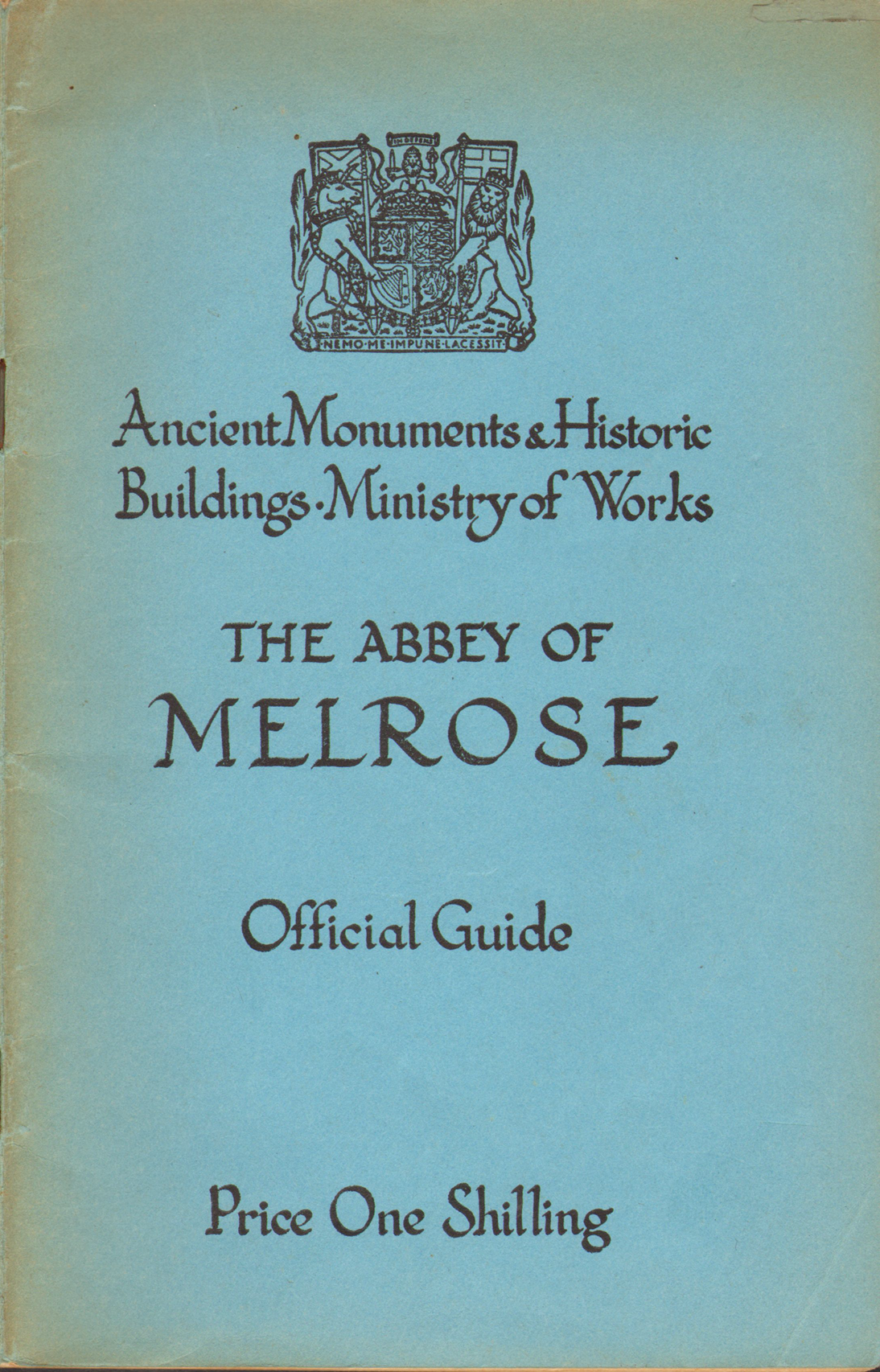
Front Cover of the Guide to Melrose Abbey

Richardson wrote and published numerous official guide-books to the monuments in public care. The following titles were made available (All published by HMSO):

- Edinburgh Castle (with Marguerite Wood), 1929. Full text of Second Edition 1948 available here
- Huntingtower, 1931. Full text of Second Edition 1950 available here
- Dryburgh Abbey (with Marguerite Wood), 1932. Full text of Second Edition 1948 available here
- Melrose Abbey (with Marguerite Wood), 1932. Full text of Second Edition 1949 available here
- Tantallon Castle, 1932. Full text of Second Edition 1950 available here
- Hailes Castle, 1933
- The Castle of Dirleton, 1934. Full text of Second Edition 1950 available here
- The Abbey of Dundrennan, 1934
- The Abbey of Sweetheart, 1934. Full text of Second Edition 1950 available here
- The Cathedral Kirk of Moray: Elgin (with H.B. Mackintosh), 1934. Full text of Second Edition 1950 available here
- Linlithgow Palace (with James Beveridge), 1934. Full text of Second Edition 1948 available here
- The Abbey and Palace of Holyroodhouse, 1936. Full text of Third Edition 1950 available here
- The Castle of Balvenie (With Margaret Simpson), 1936
- The Castle of Stirling (with Margaret Simpson), 1936. Full text of Second Edition 1948 available here
- Inchmahome Priory (with Margaret Simpson), 1937
- The Broch of Gurness, Aikerness, 1948. Full text available here
Some illustrations from the guide-books
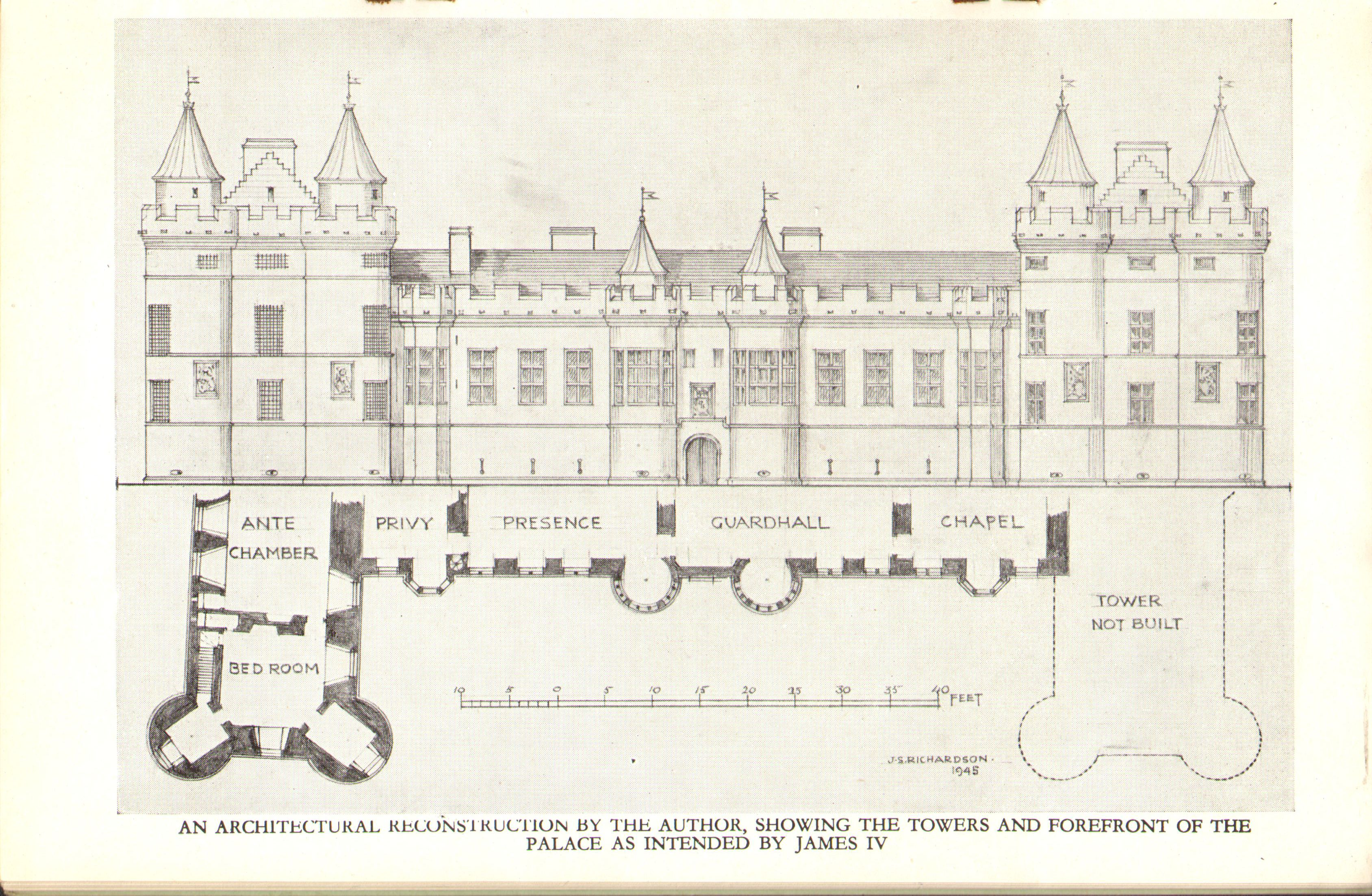
Architectural reconstruction of Holyrood Palace

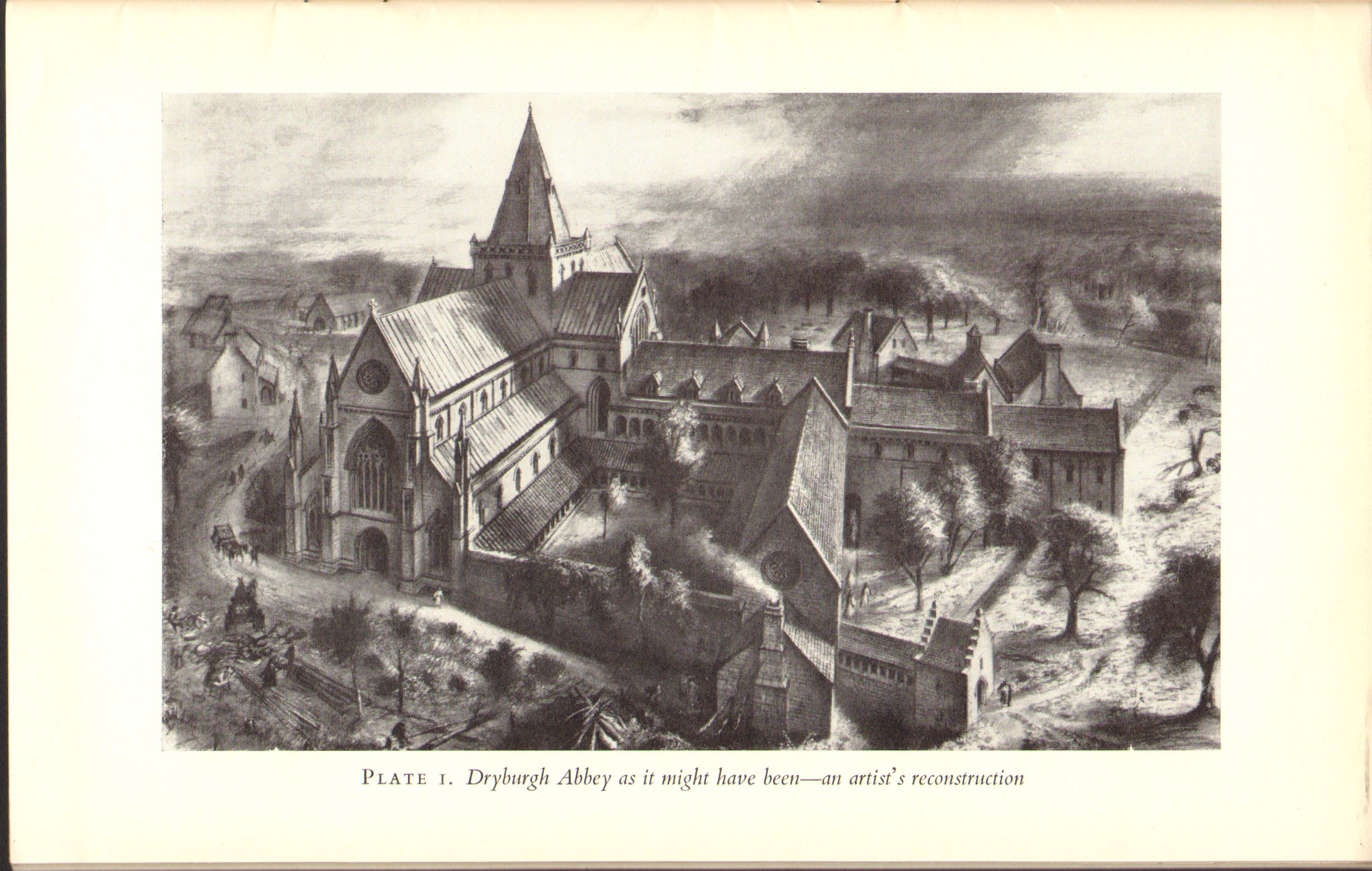
Artist's reconstruction of Dryburgh Abbey

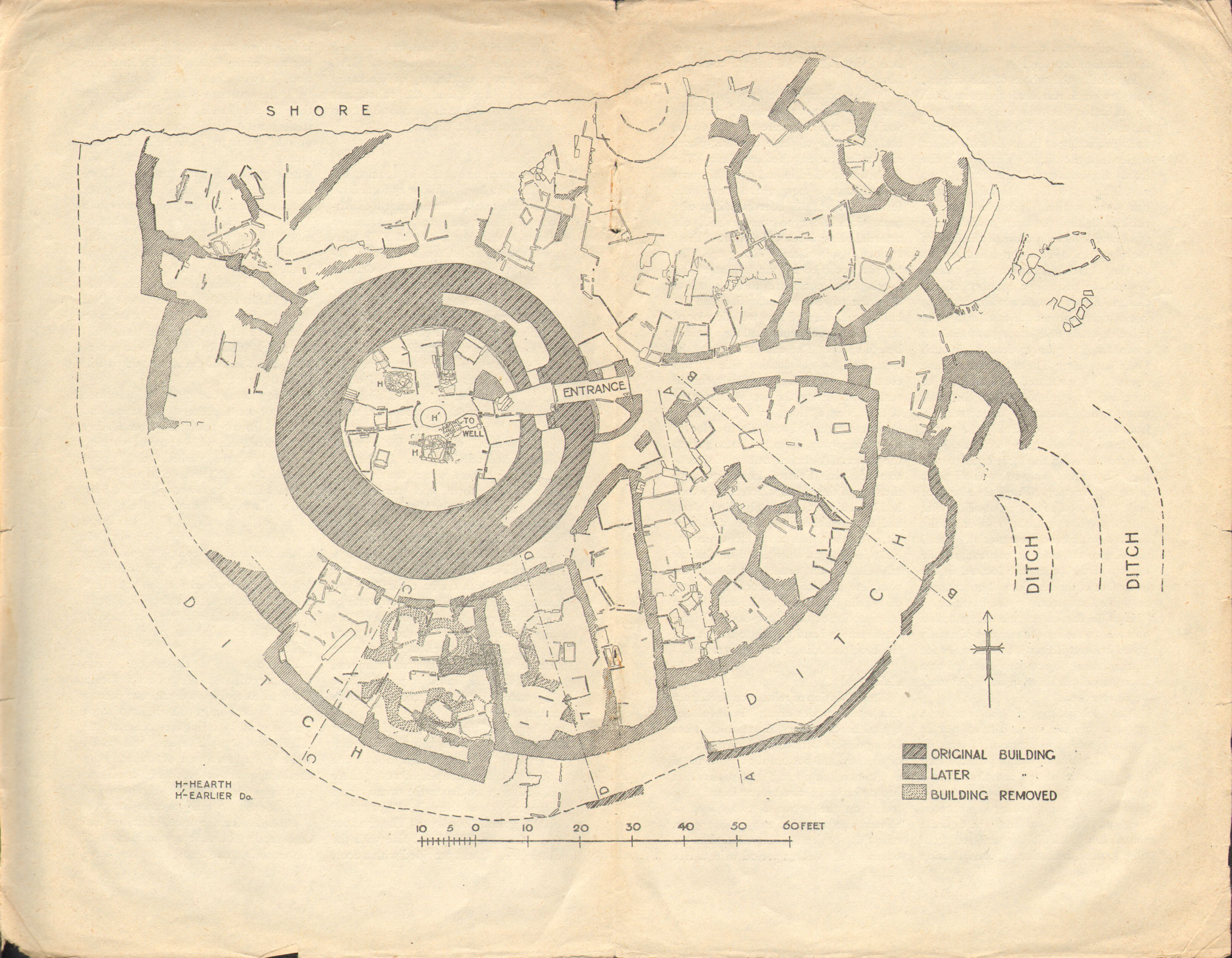
Plan of the excavations at the Broch of Gurness

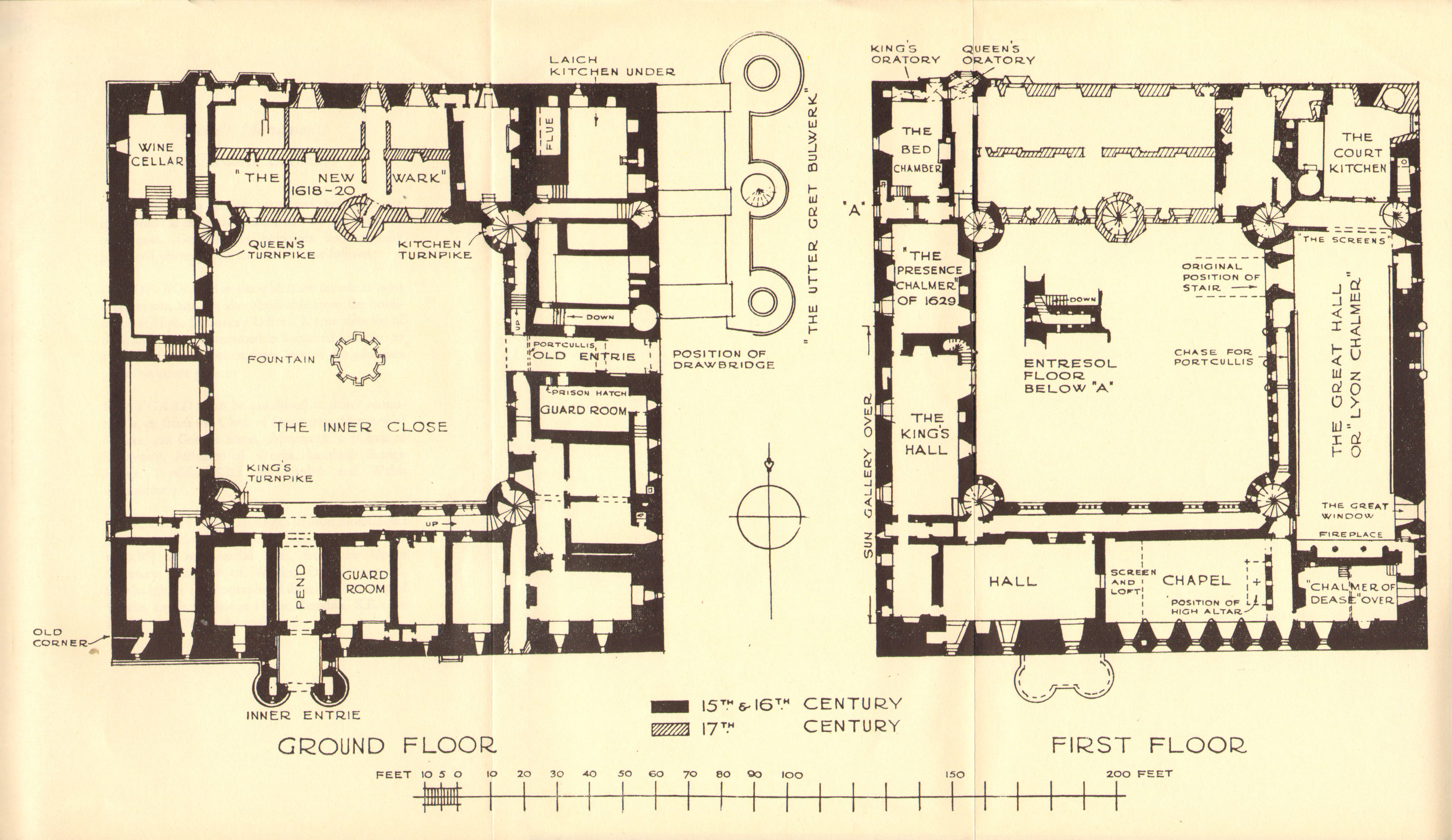
Ground plan of Linlithgow Palace

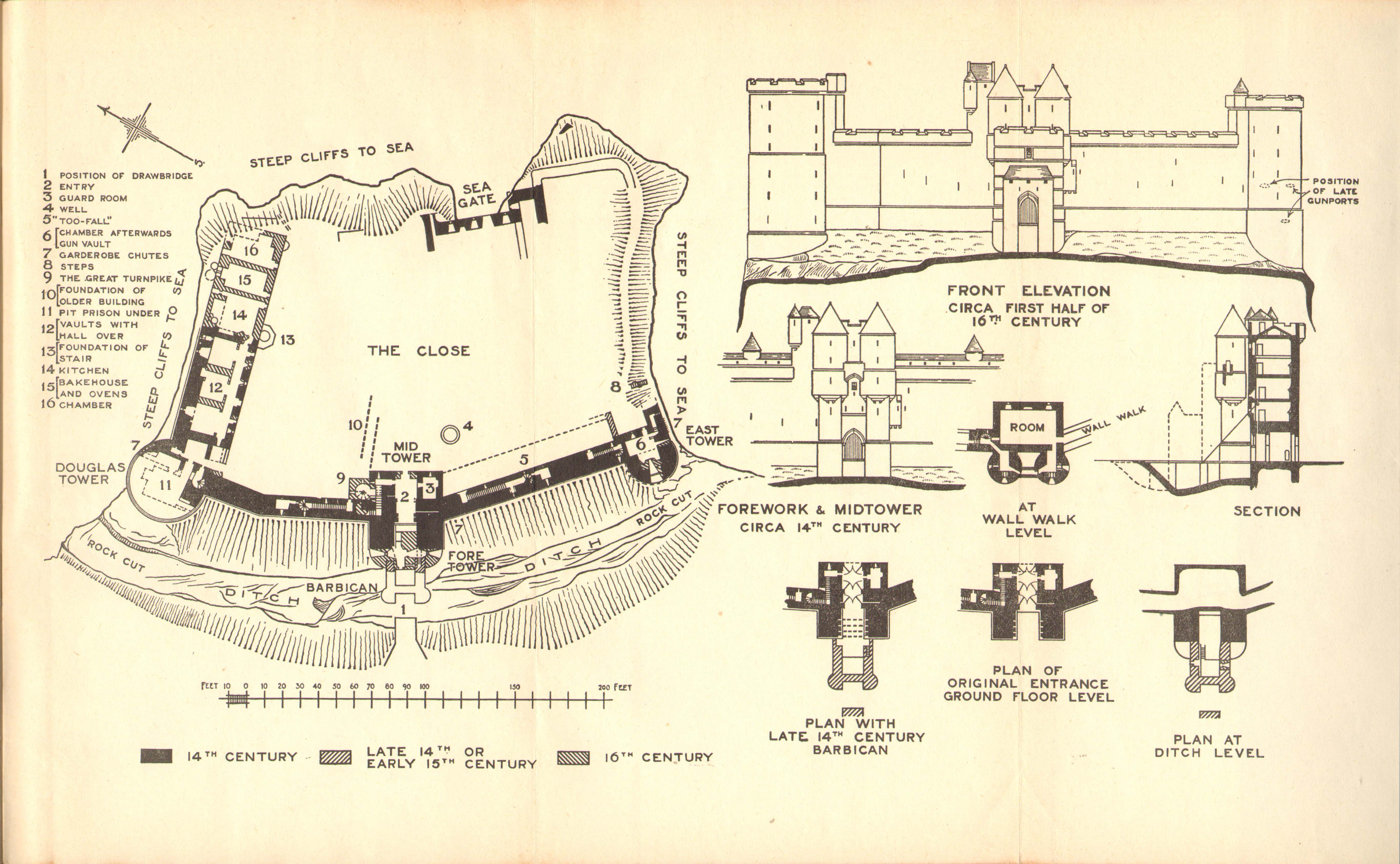
Plan and elevation of Tantallon Castle

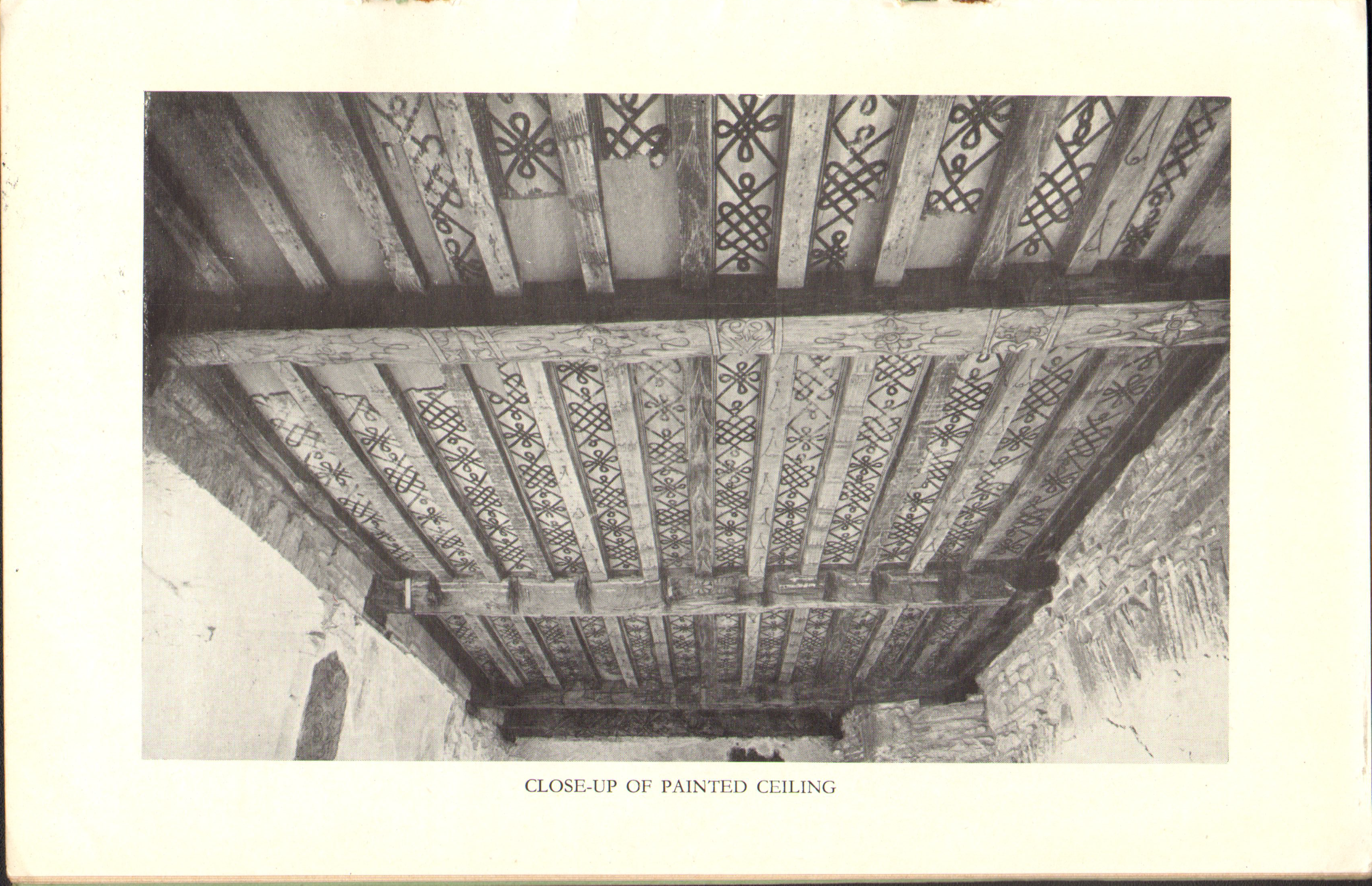
Huntingtower Castle Painted Ceiling

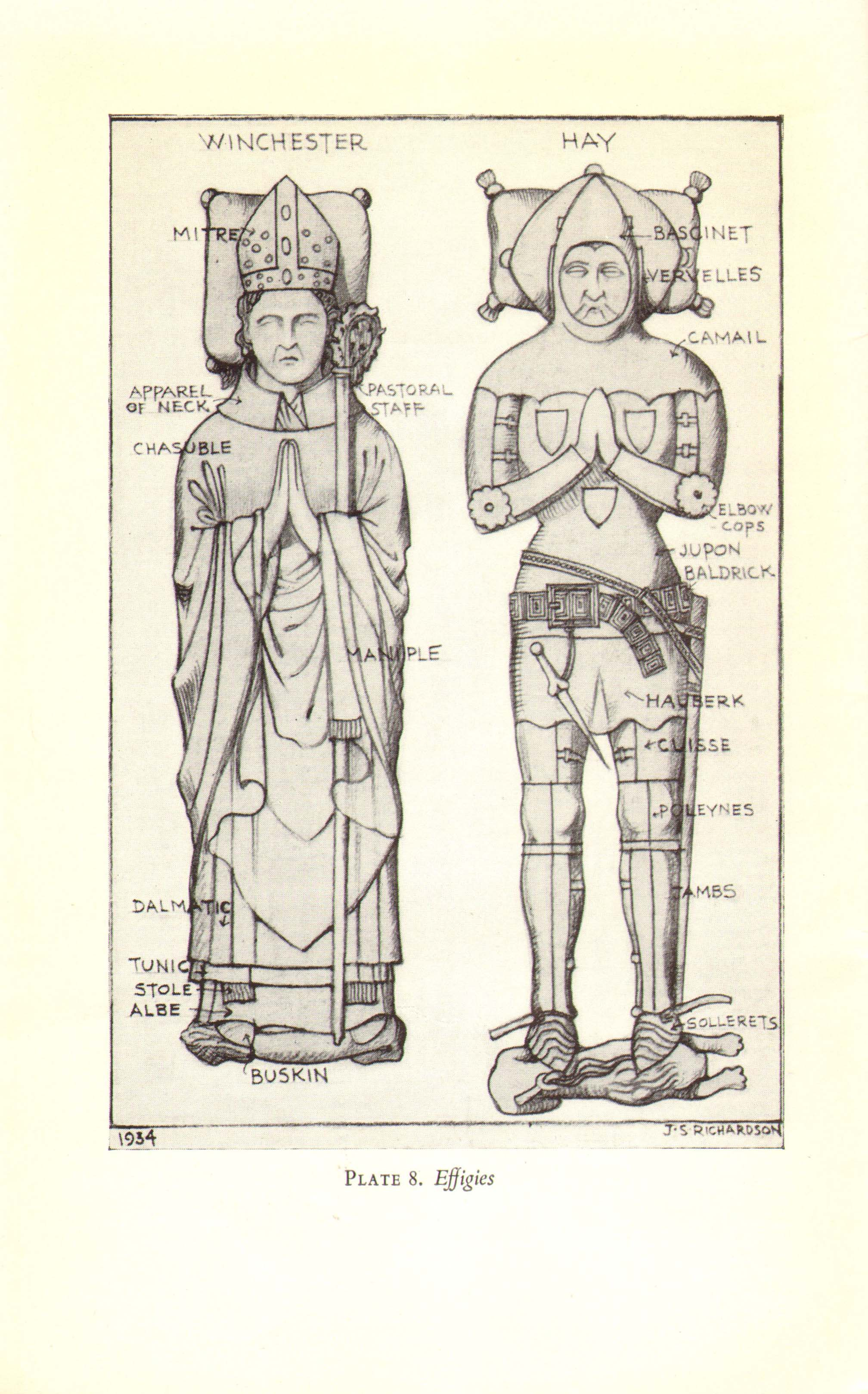
Effigies in Elgin Cathedral

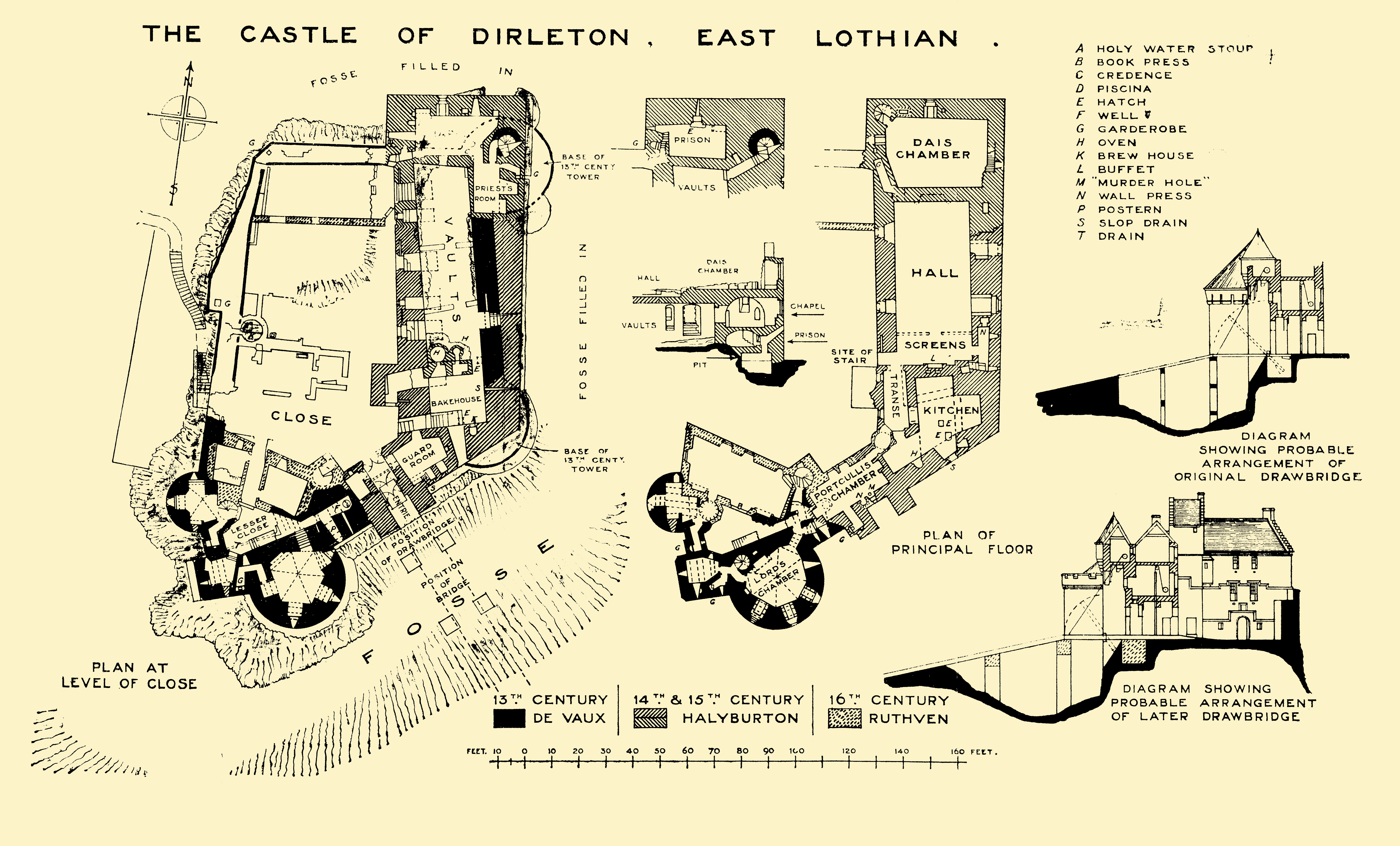
Plans and sections of Dirleton Castle

== Other publications ==
- Richardson, J.T.; Richardson, J.S (1902). "Prehistoric remains near Gullane". Proceedings of the Society of Antiquaries of Scotland. 36: 654–658.
- Cree, J.; Richardson, J.; Crombie, J. F. (1907). "Notice of the Discovery of a Bronze-Age Cist and Urn in the West Links, North Berwick. With Notes on the Bones found in the Cist". Proceedings of the Society of Antiquaries of Scotland. 41: 393–400.
- Richardson, J. (1925). "A Hoard of Bronze Objects from Wester Ord, Ross-shire, and an Early Iron Age Burial at Blackness Castle, Linlithgowshire". Proceedings of the Society of Antiquaries of Scotland. 59: 113–119.
- —— (1926). "Unrecorded Scottish Wood Carvings". Proceedings of the Society of Antiquaries of Scotland. 60: 384–408.
- —— (1927). "The Campbell of Lerags Cross at Kilbride, near Oban, with a Note on Cross-heads of Late Mediaeval Date in the West Highalnds". Proceedings of the Society of Antiquaries of Scotland. 61: 143–162.
- —— (1928). "Fragments of Altar Retables of Late Mediaeval Date in Scotland". Proceedings of the Society of Antiquaries of Scotland. 62: 197–224.
- —— (1929). "A Thirteenth-Century Tile Kiln at North Berwick, East Lothian, and Scottish Mediaeval Ornamented Floor Tiles". Proceedings of the Society of Antiquaries of Scotland. 63: 281–310.
- ——; Lindsay, I. (1951). "Excavation of Kalemouth Cairn, Roxburghshire". Proceedings of the Society of Antiquaries of Scotland. 86: 200–201.
- —— (1964). The Mediaeval stone carver in scotland. Edinburgh University Press.
