= Craiglockhart Hill =

Pair of mountains in Scotland

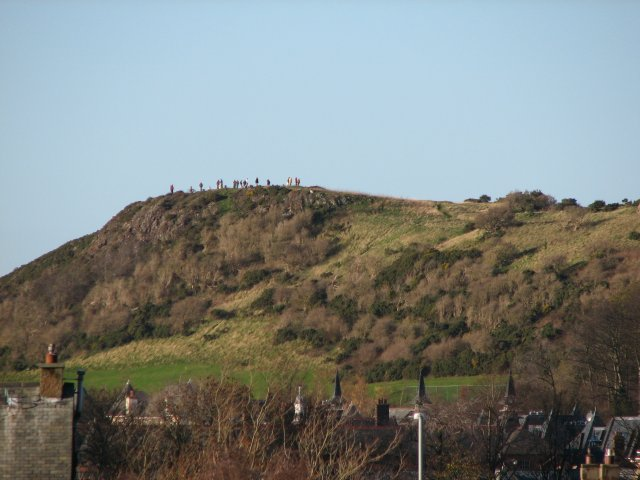
- A small crowd on Wester Craiglockhart Hill gathers to watch the demolition of the tower blocks at Oxgangs

Highest point
- Coordinates: 55°55′6.27″N 3°14′9.59″W

Geography
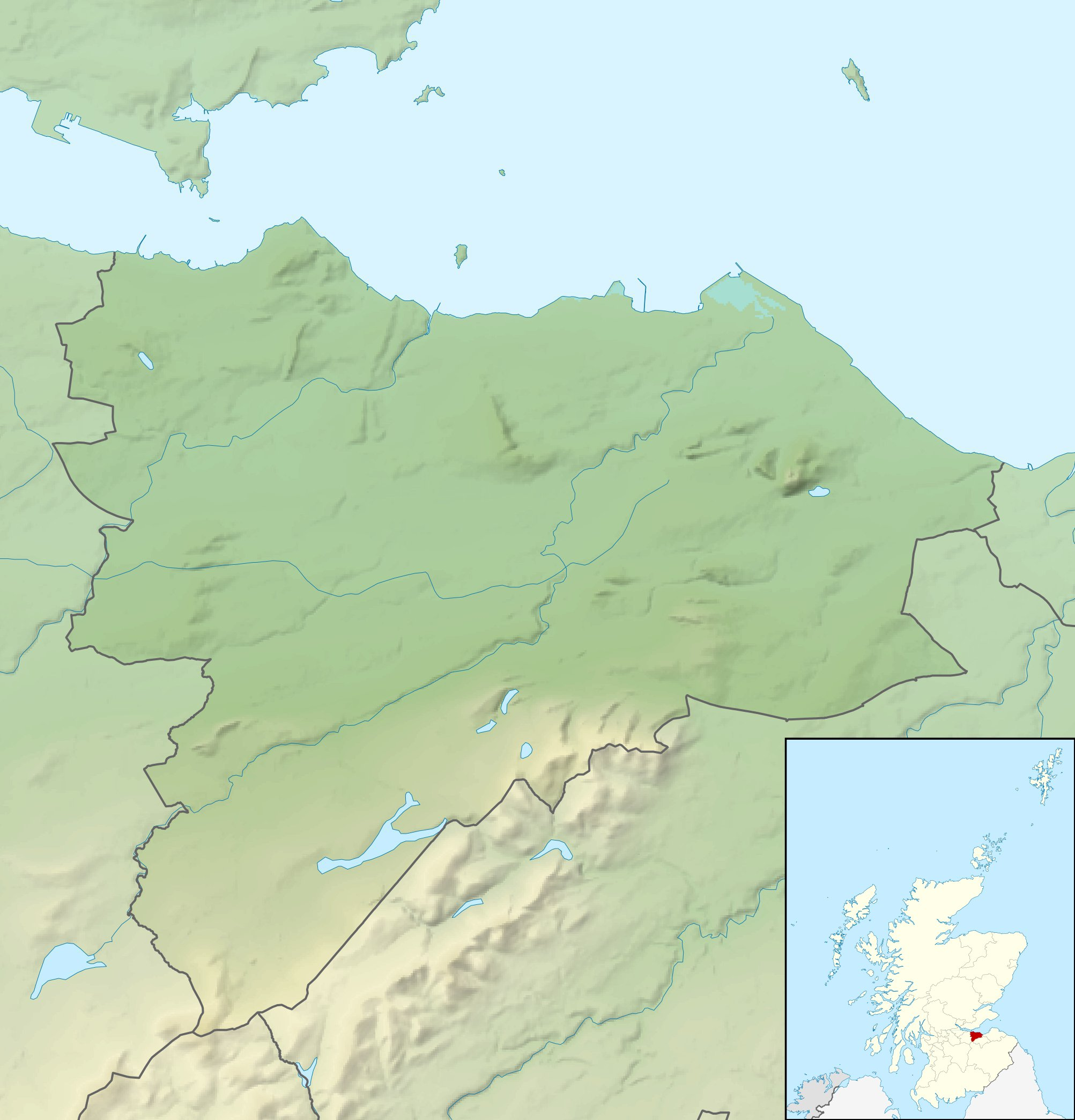
- Location within Edinburgh Location within the City of Edinburgh council area Location within Scotland
- Location: Edinburgh
- OS grid: NT227701

Craiglockhart Hill is a combination of two summits, Easter and Wester Craiglockhart, in the suburb of Craiglockhart, Edinburgh.

Easter Craiglockhart Hill's summit is 158m high. In 2004 this hill was designated a local nature reserve. Wester Craiglockhart Hill has a summit of 175m.

The hills are formed of Carboniferous basaltic lava and ash on sandstone. On part of Wester Craiglockhart an exposed upper lava deposit about 30 metres thick features a central area of well-formed columns. When this lava crystallized, a series of hexagonal cracks produced the columnar structure.

The valley between the two summits is called Glenlockhart. The valley took its present form over 17,000 years ago when an ice sheet covered the area. Meltwater from the Water of Leith, then dammed by ice, cut the channel.
