= Craig House, Edinburgh =

Coordinates: 55°55′23″N 3°13′41″W

Craig House
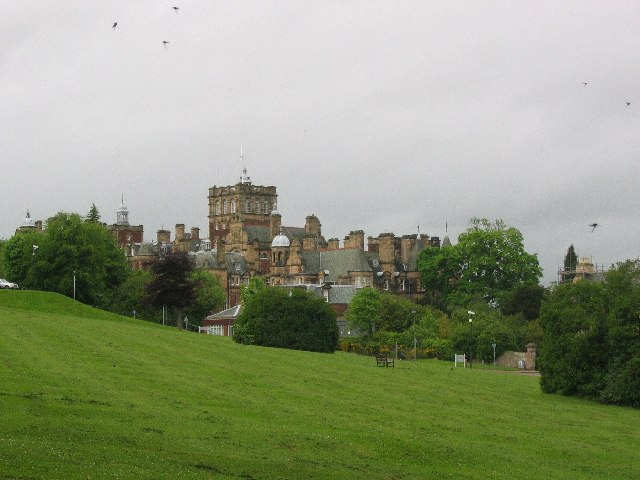
- New Craig House
- Interactive map of Craig House
- Location: Craighouse Road, Edinburgh, EH10 5FA

Listed Building – Category A
- Official name: Craig House (Old)
- Designated: 14 December 1970
- Reference no.: LB28046

Listed Building – Category A
- Official name: Craig House
- Designated: 28 August 1979
- Reference no.: LB27736

Craig House is a historic house and estate located on Easter Craiglockhart Hill, between the Craiglockhart and Morningside areas of Edinburgh, Scotland. Old Craig House dates back to the 16th century, and it succeeded an earlier building. In the late 19th century it was purchased by the Royal Edinburgh Hospital, and the site was developed as Craig House Hospital, a psychiatric hospital, which included substantial new buildings. Following refurbishment, the site was opened in 1996 as the Craighouse Campus of Edinburgh Napier University.

== History ==
Craig House is recorded in the reign of King David II, and in 1528 the Abbot of Newbattle granted a charter here. The original house was burned down by the Earl of Hertford in 1544, during the Rough Wooing.

=== Old Craig House ===
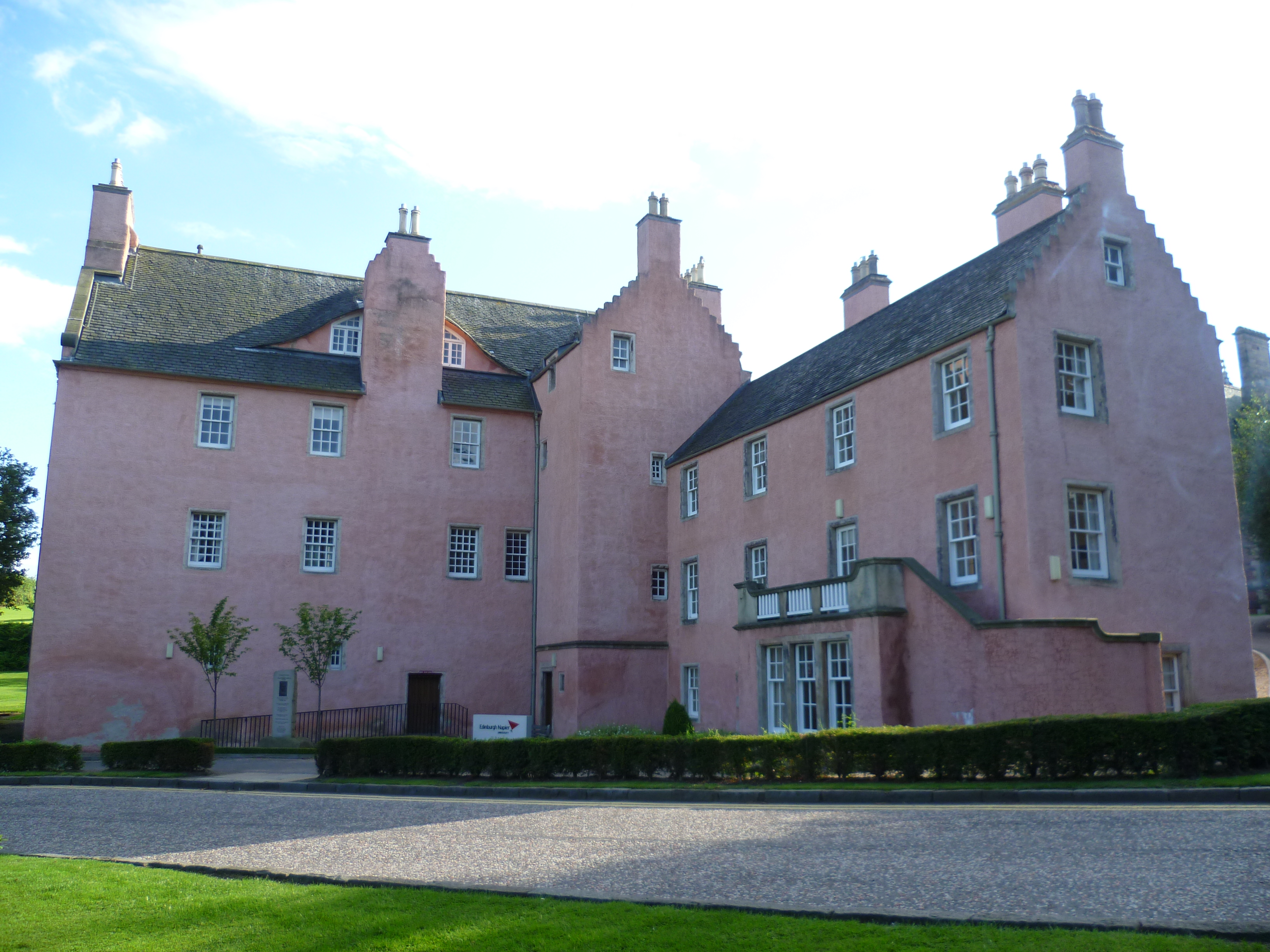
Old Craig House

The present Old Craig House is dated 1565, although the architecture suggests a later date. It was built for the Symsounes of Craighouse. It later belonged to the Dick family, and was extended to the north-west around 1746. The historian John Hill Burton (1809–1881) lived at Craig House. There is a monument commemorating his son WK Burton's contribution to Japan at the garden wall.

In the 1880s it was described as "a weird-looking mansion, alleged to be ghost-haunted" in Cassell's Old and New Edinburgh.

=== Craig House Hospital ===
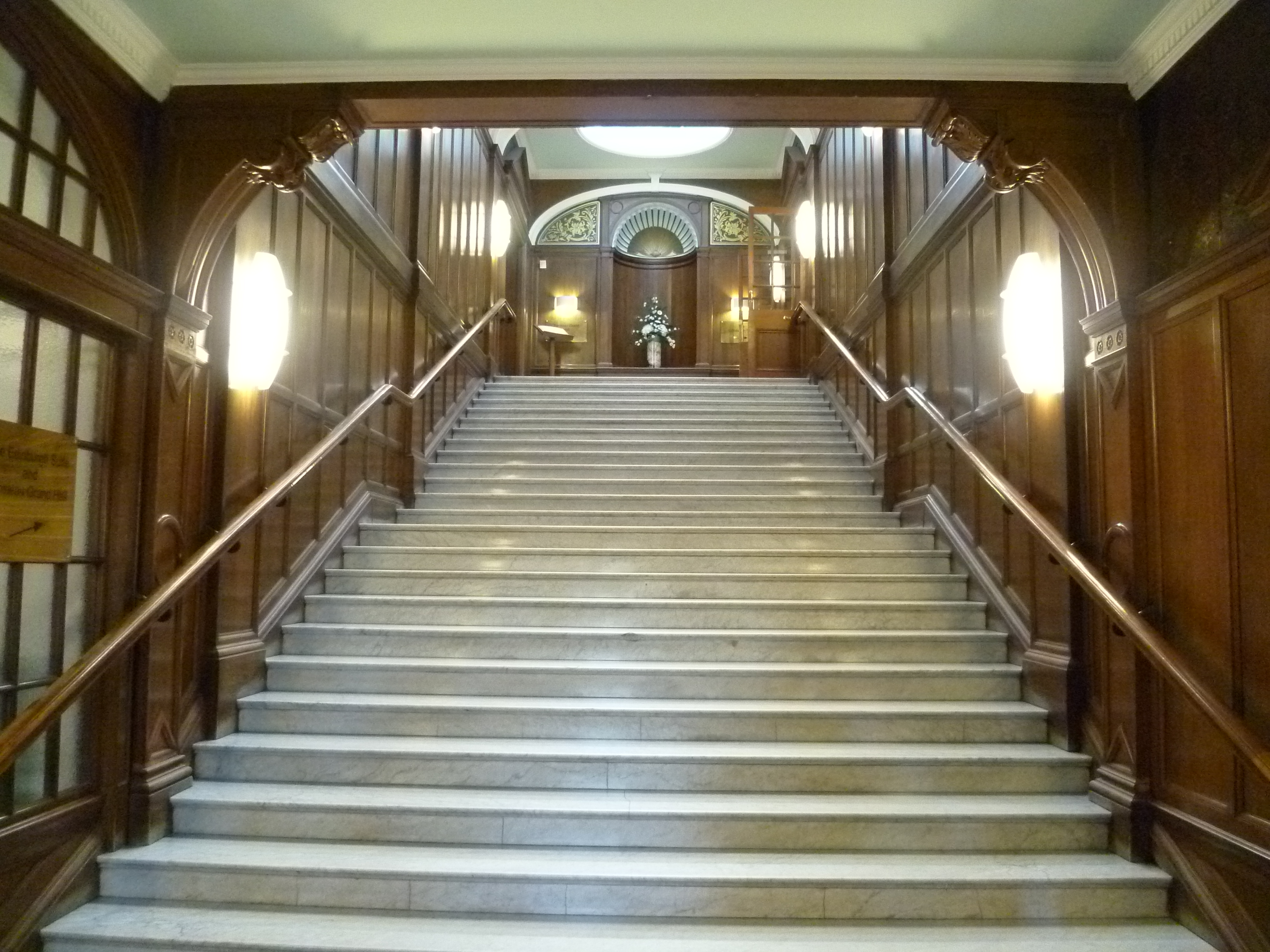
Stairway in the main hospital block

In the 1880s, Dr Thomas Clouston, Physician Superintendent of the Edinburgh Lunatic Asylum (later the Royal Edinburgh Hospital), oversaw the purchase of Craig House by the managers of the Asylum in 1878. The site was intended for paying patients, and development was funded through the sale of land at the existing Asylum in Morningside. The new buildings at Craig House were planned by Clouston, and designed under the control of architect Sydney Mitchell in 1887 (whose father Dr Arthur Mitchell was on the board of directors at the asylum). The actual job architect responsible for the design was Charles Henry Greig rather than Mitchell himself, despite Mitchell being widely credited for the design. Work began in 1889 on the large main building, a hospital block, and three detached villas, all of which were completed by 1894. The main building, New Craig House, was intentionally grand, resembling a country house or hotel rather than an institution. It is designed in a picturesque "free Renaissance" style, with elements taken from French Renaissance architecture. The interiors include a great hall and a billiard room.

From 1906 to 1914 work was executed by Mitchell's assistant Ernest Auldjo Jamieson (acting as sole partner from 1909).

The hospital was renamed the Thomas Clouston Clinic in 1972 but, after the introduction of Care in the Community in the early 1980s, the hospital went into a period of decline and closed in the early 1990s.

=== Craighouse Campus ===
In 1994, Edinburgh Napier University purchased the 60 acres (24 ha) estate, and commenced a £14 million refurbishment, funded by a Historic Building Grant. The new campus opened in September 1996. The campus was home to the social science and communication arts courses, as well as the Ian Tomlin School of Music.

In March 2011, Edinburgh Napier University sold the campus for residential development, and had moved out completely by 2013. The students and staff who were based at the Craighouse campus were moved to Edinburgh Napier University's Sighthill, Merchiston and Craiglockhart campuses.

=== Redevelopment ===
The Craighouse estate had been acquired by Mountgrange Real Estate Opportunity Fund (MoREOF) through Craighouse Limited (Isle of Man) with the MoREOF fund being administered by Mountgrange Investment Management LLP. A consortium was formed by Edinburgh Napier University, Mountgrange and Sundial Properties for the purpose of undertaking development on the estate. The planned development comprised renovation of the existing buildings and extensive residential new build throughout the grounds of the estate, totaling approximately 116 new units.

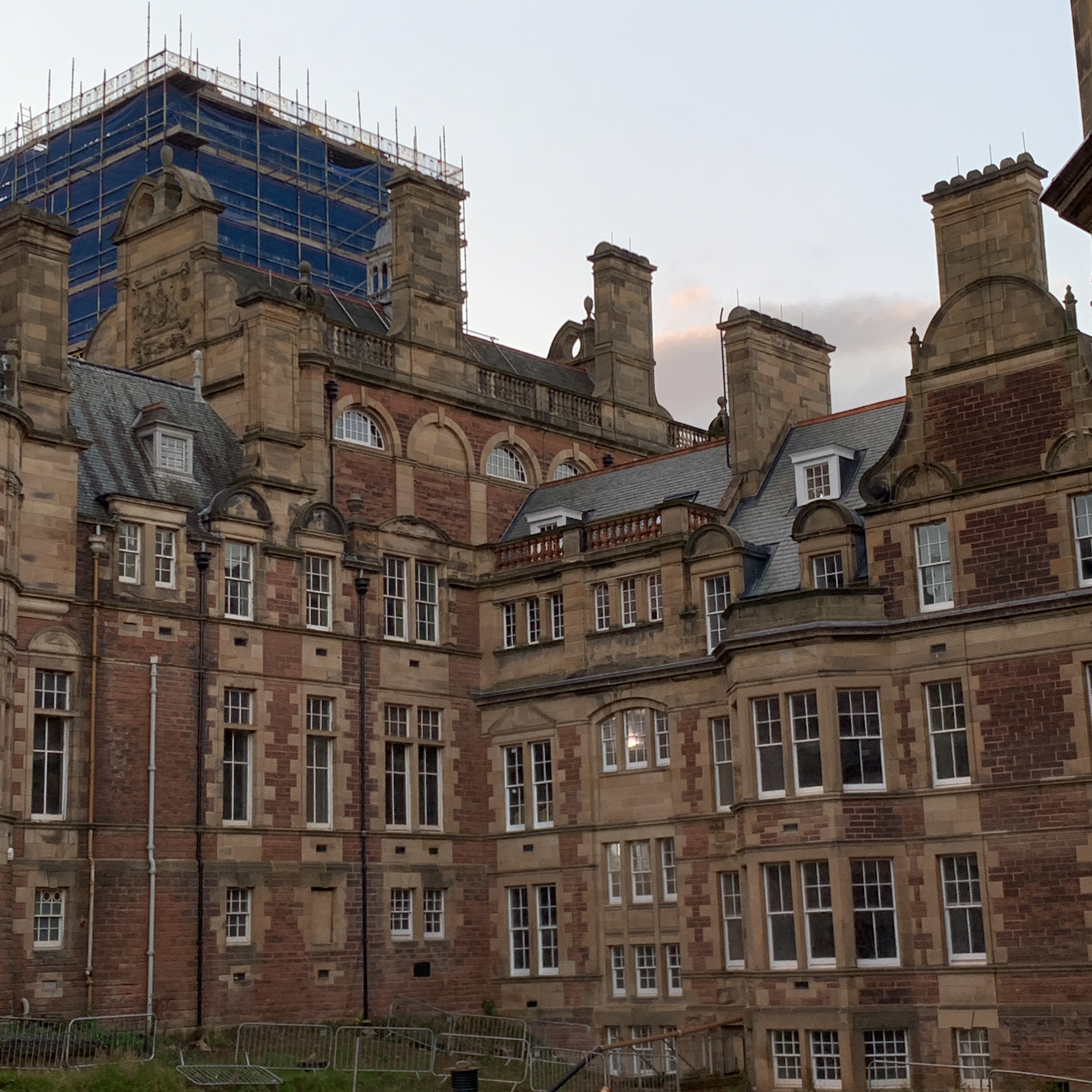
New Craig House

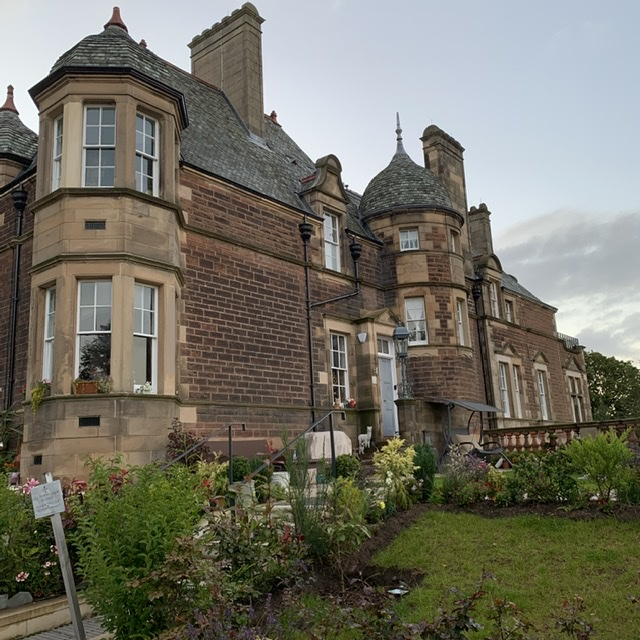
South Craig

The proposals as advanced by The Craighouse Partnership met with considerable opposition due to the plans to build on the open green space within the estate. The Friends of Craighouse, a campaign group opposing any new build at Craighouse, collected some 5,000 signatures on a petition against new build development. However, the development went ahead and the first residents moved into the building in July 2019.

== Notable inmates ==
- John Ross McKay, an architect, died here in 1962
