= Craiglockhart =

Suburb of Edinburgh, Scotland

Coordinates: 55.918117°N 3.240194°W

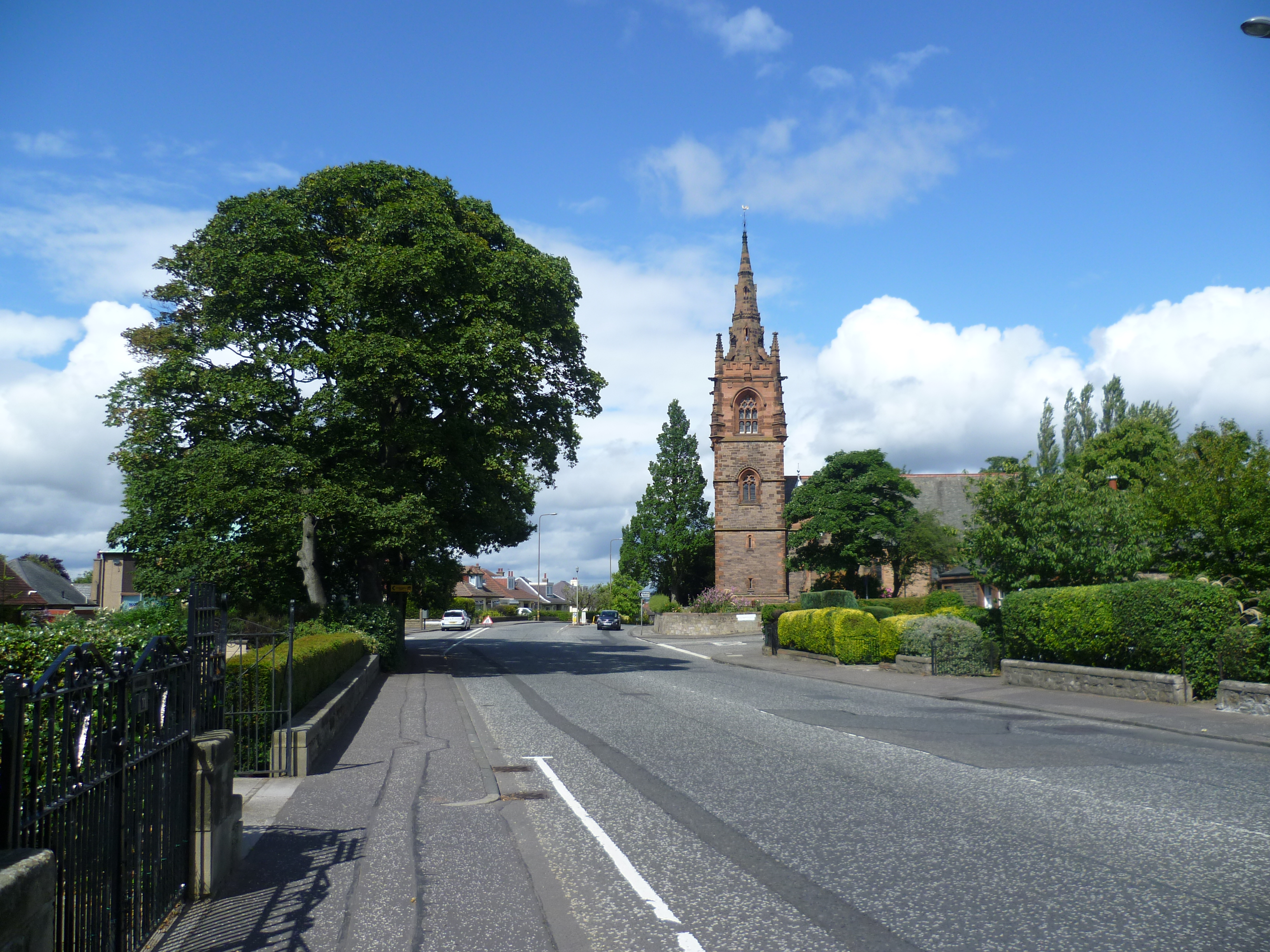
Craiglockhart

Craiglockhart (/kreɪɡˈlɒkərt/; Scottish Gaelic: Creag Longairt) is a suburb in the south west of Edinburgh, Scotland, lying between Colinton to the south, Morningside to the east Merchiston to the north east, and Longstone and Kingsknowe to the west. The Water of Leith is also to the west.

== History ==
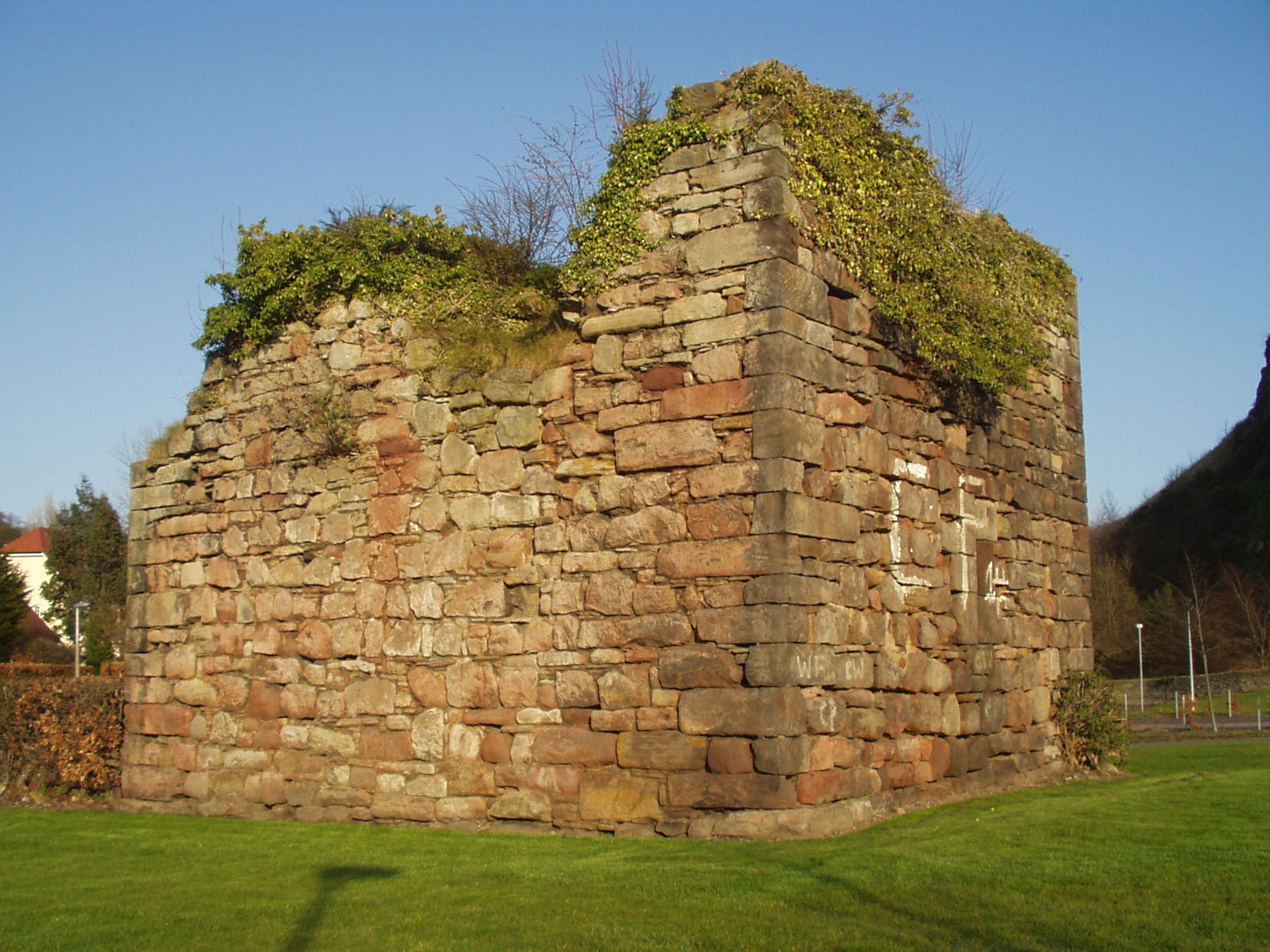
Craiglockhart Castle

The name is first recorded in 1278 as "Crag quam Stephanus Loccard miles tenuit", thus "Craig (or rock) of Loccard". The family, whose name was changed to Lockhart, are credited by Historic Scotland with building Craiglockhart Castle in the fifteenth century.

The oldest "structure" in the area is the remains of a vitrified fort on the top of Wester Craiglockhart Hill, which is of prehistoric origin. This was somewhat mutilated by the addition of gun-emplacements in World War II, guarding against aerial attack. Excavations show the fort was re-occupied during Roman times. Craiglockhart Castle dates from the 15th century but is now ruined. The hill is also a Site of Special Scientific Interest (SSSI) due to its diverse biological habitat.

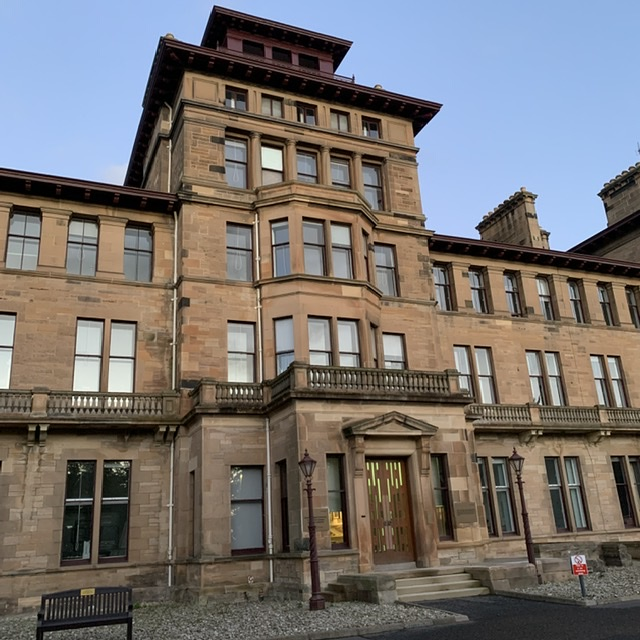
Edinburgh Napier University

Redhall (also known was Reidhall) was a castle on the border between Longstone and Craiglockhart beside the Water of Leith. The castle was owned by Adam Otterburn, a Scottish lawyer in the 16th century. It was later besieged and taken by the forces of Oliver Cromwell in 1650. In the 18th century, the castle was demolished and the stones used to build Redhall House in 1756 under the ownership of George Inglis of Auchendinny. The associated gardens were designed by James Bowie in 1758. The castle's octagonal doocot was kept and a walled garden also created on the north side of the Water of Leith in Longstone. The house was subsequently inherited by his nephew, Vice-Admiral John Inglis. By the early 20th century, the House was purchased by the Edinburgh Corporation and converted to a children's home, now since defunct. Some of the adjacent estate has been converted to housing, with the doocot restored, although the main house remains abandoned.

In Victorian times the area was dominated by hospital buildings: The City Hospital (1896); Old Craig House (1565) converted to an asylum in 1878; its "modern" partner, Craighouse, purpose-built as part of the Royal Edinburgh Asylum (1889); the City Poorhouse (1867) later converted to Greenlea's Old People's Home; and Craiglockhart Hydropathic Institution, and in the years 1871-1982 this building rose dramatically above and directly overlooked the home playing grounds of Edinburgh University RFC. Craighouse and The Hydropathic are now part of the campus of Edinburgh Napier University. During the First World War, the hospital was used to house officers suffering from the symptoms of shell-shock. Invalids here included the poets Wilfred Owen and Siegfried Sassoon, who met while patients. After the war this the building served as a convent and then a theological school, before passing to the then Napier College.

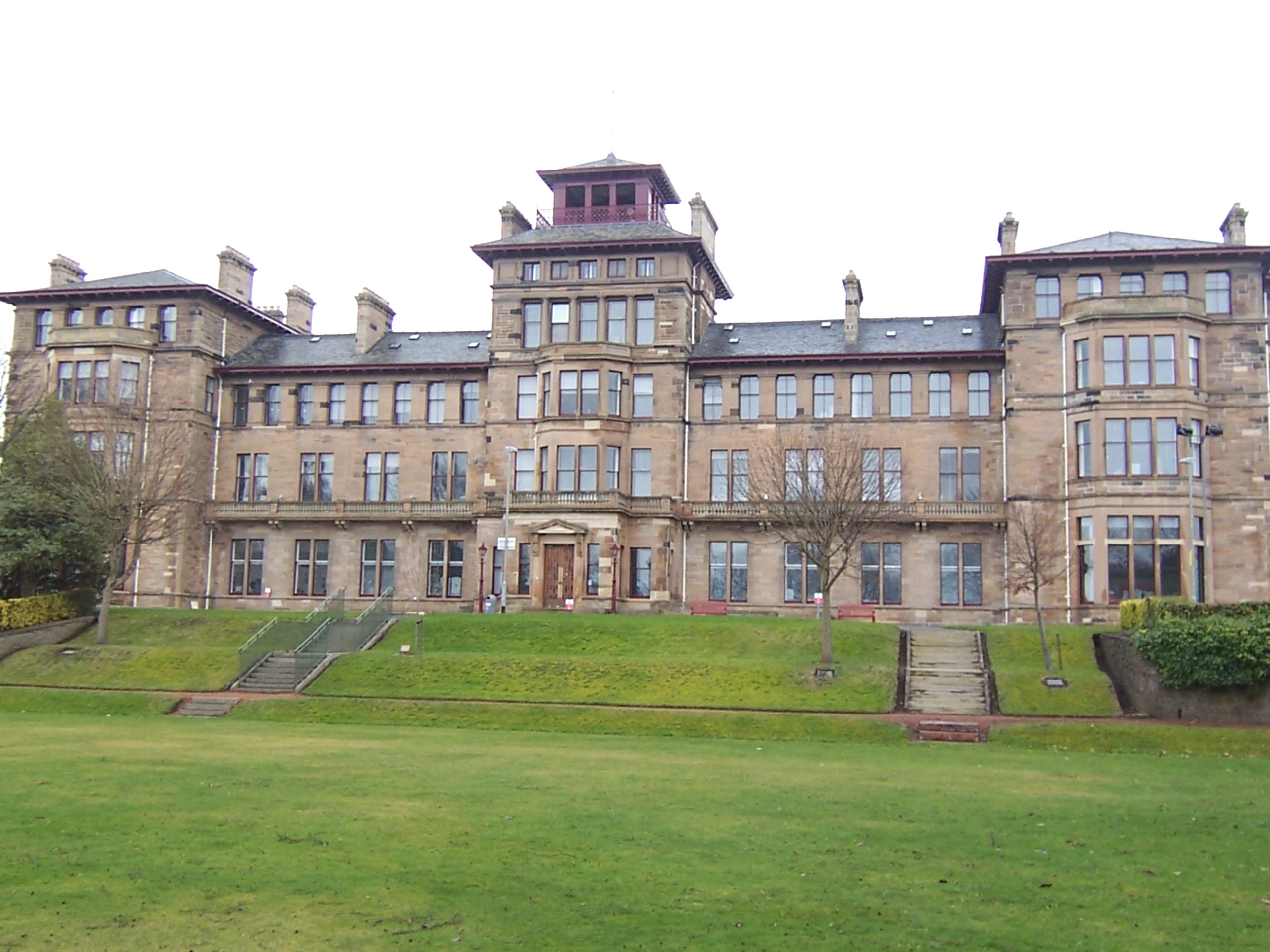
Main front showing the scale of the Hydropathic (The building now forms part of Edinburgh Napier University Business School)

The area became part of Edinburgh City in 1920 and consequently the area was developed in the 1930s, largely with bungalows and low density housing on the low-lying ground around the Wester and Easter Craiglockhart Hills.

Approximately at the boundary point between Craiglockhart and Merchiston runs the Edinburgh Suburban railway line. There was once a station just off Colinton Road, and this may return, since the line is mooted for re-opening as part of Edinburgh's future transport strategy.

Not until 1899 was Craiglockhart granted its own church, designed by Hay and Henderson, technically a quoad sacra church linked to Colinton parish. Its first minister was Robert Walker Mackersy (1833-1902). He was replaced by Alfred William Anderson (b. 1869) in 1903.

Craiglockhart today is chiefly residential, with a small proportion of commercial properties, and is in general considered to be a comfortable middle-class area, with a mixture of terraced and detached villas, of a variety of ages.

== Demographics ==
Ethnicity	Fountainbridge/Craiglockhart	Edinburgh
White	83.4%	84.9%
Asian	10.8%	8.6%
Black	1.5%	2.1%
Mixed	1.9%	2.5%
Other	2.4%	1.9%

== Attractions and amenities ==
Craiglockhart Tennis Centre plays host to large international tennis competitions, with a series of well kept indoor and outdoor courts. One famous product of the centre is Andy Murray, who often trained there. On the same ground is Craiglockhart Sport And Leisure Centre which has a small boating pond which was built in 1887. Today the pond is no longer used for boating, and now serves as an important nest and roost site for urban water birds.

A small cluster of commercial premises remain close to the station site, with a further group located opposite the Craiglockhart Tennis Centre. A small Tesco "Express" supermarket has been built on the site of a former petrol station adjacent to the Meggetland playing fields. The opening of this branch of Tesco was vociferously opposed by the Scottish food writer Joanna Blythman, who claimed that opening the store would damage the local grocery store at Happy Valley.

There is a Craiglockhart Primary School, although this is a little to the north of Craiglockhart itself, technically within North Merchiston (though commonly described as within Polwarth or Shandon.)
