= Pate's Grammar School =

School in Cheltenham, England

Location
- Princess Elizabeth Way; Cheltenham, Gloucestershire, GL51 0HG; England
- 51.907°N 2.117°W

Information
- Type: Grammar school; Academy
- Motto: Latin: Patebit tum quod Latuit; English: That which is hidden shall be revealed
- Established: 1574; 452 years ago
- Founder: Richard Pate
- Department for Education URN: 136353 Tables
- Ofsted: Reports
- Head teacher: James Richardson
- Staff: 87 teaching, 35 support
- Gender: Coeducational
- Age: 11 to 18
- Enrolment: 995
- Houses: Beaufort; Gloucester; Richmond; York; Pembroke
- Colours: Black, grey, white, red
- Publication: Reveal; Pate's Progress; The Grammar School Gazette
- Alumni: Old Patesians
- Website: www.patesgs.org

Pate's Grammar School is a grammar school with academy status in Cheltenham, Gloucestershire, England. It caters for pupils aged 11 to 18. The school was founded with a fund bestowed to Corpus Christi College, Oxford, by Richard Pate in 1574. The school became co-educational in 1986, when Pate's Grammar School for Girls merged with Cheltenham Grammar School.

Pate's has been awarded 'State Secondary School of the Year' twice by The Sunday Times in their Good Schools Guide in 2012 and 2020. In 2013, and again in 2024, the school was given an Outstanding judgement by Ofsted.

== Academic achievements ==
At GCSE level in 2004, 100% of pupils entered earned five A* to C grades, and the school came twelfth in the BBC table of performance in A-/AS-Level. Again in 2005, 100% of pupils earned five A* to C grades at GCSE, and in 2006, 100% of pupils passed in at least seven subjects with grades A* to C.

The physics department was recognised as the best in the country in a survey published by The Observer in May 2006.

In 2012 Pate's achieved the fourth best state secondary school results in the United Kingdom. It was also awarded with 'State Secondary School of the Year'. In 2019 the school was ranked as one of the top secondary state schools in the UK with 95.6% of grades at A*-B at A-level and 87.5% of grades at 9–7 at GCSE.

== Sporting achievements ==
The senior rugby team was coached by ex-England scrum-half Peter Kingston until his retirement in 2009. In 2007 Pate's senior rugby teams completed a season unbeaten for the first time in 21 years.

The Old Patesians club has grounds and a clubhouse in Leckhampton, which was built when their previous premises were demolished to make way for Cheltenham's tallest building, Eagle Tower.

== Community ==
The school competes in the Young Enterprise competition held amongst schools nationwide. The school was also named as one of the four winners of the annual BBC School's Question Time competition in 2009.

The current headmaster is James Richardson, who took over from Russel Ellicot in September 2023.

=== Developments ===
The boys' school was established in 1586. The Gothic premises in the High Street were demolished in 1967 to make way for a concrete supermarket, at a time when many other historic buildings, which would now be listed and protected, were also lost. The school playing field existed quite remote from the school in Hesters Way, and a replacement school was built there, after the boundaries had been altered to make way for the Princess Elizabeth Way and Coronation Square council developments. The majority of pupils lived in more affluent areas on the opposite side of the town and needed to commute by public transport. The building opened in 1965 and was designed by the architects Chamberlin, Powell & Bon, and featured innovative use of concrete and brick construction, a copper-clad dome over the library and a moat, but its striking appearance was not universally popular, frequently drawing comparisons with a prison. By the 1980s the concrete had developed significant structural problems. Following the merger with the girls grammar school in 1986, the school became multi-site for a time, utilising the former Monkscroft school buildings on a nearby site, predominantly for lower school pupils. The combination of the issues with running a split-site school, and the decaying condition of both buildings led to their replacement from 1994 with new buildings. During this period the school somehow lost its nomenclature with Richard Pate, becoming known instead as Cheltenham Grammar School, and Pate's name instead became associated with the girls' school at Pittville.

The school converted from a voluntary aided school into an academy in November 2010.

In summer 2012, Pate's Grammar completed the construction of a new refectory, costing £1.75 million. This also involved upgrading the school canteen to a cashless catering system operated by sQuid. It was opened by the Duke of Gloucester on 5 October 2012. The new sixth form block was built and completed in summer 2019.

In 2013, a new school block was opened named 'The George and Eve Tatam Block', after alumni who also sponsor higher level study at both Corpus Christi, Oxford and Corpus Christi, Cambridge.

In spring 2019, a new sixth form block opened following a grant received in 2017. The three-storey building comprises study spaces and IT facilities on the lower two floors, whilst the upper floor houses the senior library. The building links directly to the George and Eve Tatum Block next to which it is constructed.

== Notable alumni ==
=== Pate's Grammar School ===
- Ben Chacko, editor since 2014 of the Morning Star
- Stephanie Collie, costume designer
- Siân Berry, Green MP since 2024 for Brighton Pavilion and former leader of the Green Party of England and Wales
- Matt Smith, professional footballer
- Sue Limb, novelist
- Laura Winter, Sport Commentator, With F1TV Since 2019

=== Cheltenham Grammar School ===
==== Music ====
- Gustav Holst, composer
- Brian Jones, musician and founder of The Rolling Stones
- Philip Lane, composer

==== Sport ====
- Gilbert Jessop, cricketer
- Robert Lanchbury, Gloucestershire cricketer
- Alfred Payne, cricketer

==== Engineers ====
- Sir Benjamin Baker, engineer of the Forth Bridge
- Sir Frederick Handley Page, founder of the aircraft company Handley Page
- Gordon Lewis, aeronautical engineer, and designer of the Olympus and Pegasus engines with Bristol Siddeley
- Bob Parkinson, rocket engineer with British Aerospace, worked on HOTOL
- Francis Walley, structural engineer who promoted prestressed concrete after the Second World War

==== Academia ====
- William Henry Corfield, revolutionised hygiene and household sanitation in Victorian England.
- Sir Rowland Biffen, developed disease resistant wheat strains
- H. J. Round, scientist, played an important part in the discovery of light-emitting diodes
- Martin Hume Johnson, Professor of Reproductive Sciences from 1992 to 2012 at the University of Cambridge (Christ's College)
- Piers Coleman, theoretical physicist, Professor of Physics Rutgers University and brother of Jaz Coleman.
- Anthony Howe, professor of modern history since 2003 at UEA
- Kit Fine, philosopher

==== Politics ====
- Adrian Bailey, Labour MP from 2000 to 2019 for West Bromwich West.
- John Roberts, Liberal MP from 1885 to 1906 for South Caernarfonshire, Eifion

==== Film & TV ====
- John Ringham, character actor
- Rex Tucker, TV director, Head of BBC TV drama from 1969 to 1981
- Desmond Wilcox, TV reporter, late husband of Dame Esther Rantzen

==== Authors ====
- Robert Hawker, poet
- Geoff Dyer, writer

==== Other ====
- Colonel John Chard, British Army officer; received the Victoria Cross (VC) for his service in January 1879 at Rorke's Drift
- Peter Lampl, founder of the Sutton Trust
- Sir Edgar Vaughan, ambassador from 1960 to 1963 to Panama
- Ernest Blackie, Bishop of Grimsby from 1935 to 1937
- The Baron Christopher, general secretary from 1976 to 1988 of the Inland Revenue Staff Federation
- John Clink, Flag Officer Sea Training since 2015

=== Pate's Grammar School for Girls ===
- Mary Honeyball, Labour MEP 2000 - 2019 for London
- Dame Felicity Lott, soprano
- Dame Lesley Rees, endocrinologist, professor of chemical endocrinology since 1978 at Barts and The London School of Medicine and Dentistry
- Fiona Sampson, poet, professor of poetry since 2013 at the University of Roehampton
- Anne Warner, professor of developmental biology at UCL, and director from 1999 to 2006 of UCL's Centre for Mathematics and Physics in the Life Sciences and Experimental Biology

== See also ==
- Old Patesians RFC
