= HMSO Store, Sighthill =

Listed building in Edinburgh

His Majesty's Stationery Office Store, Sighthill
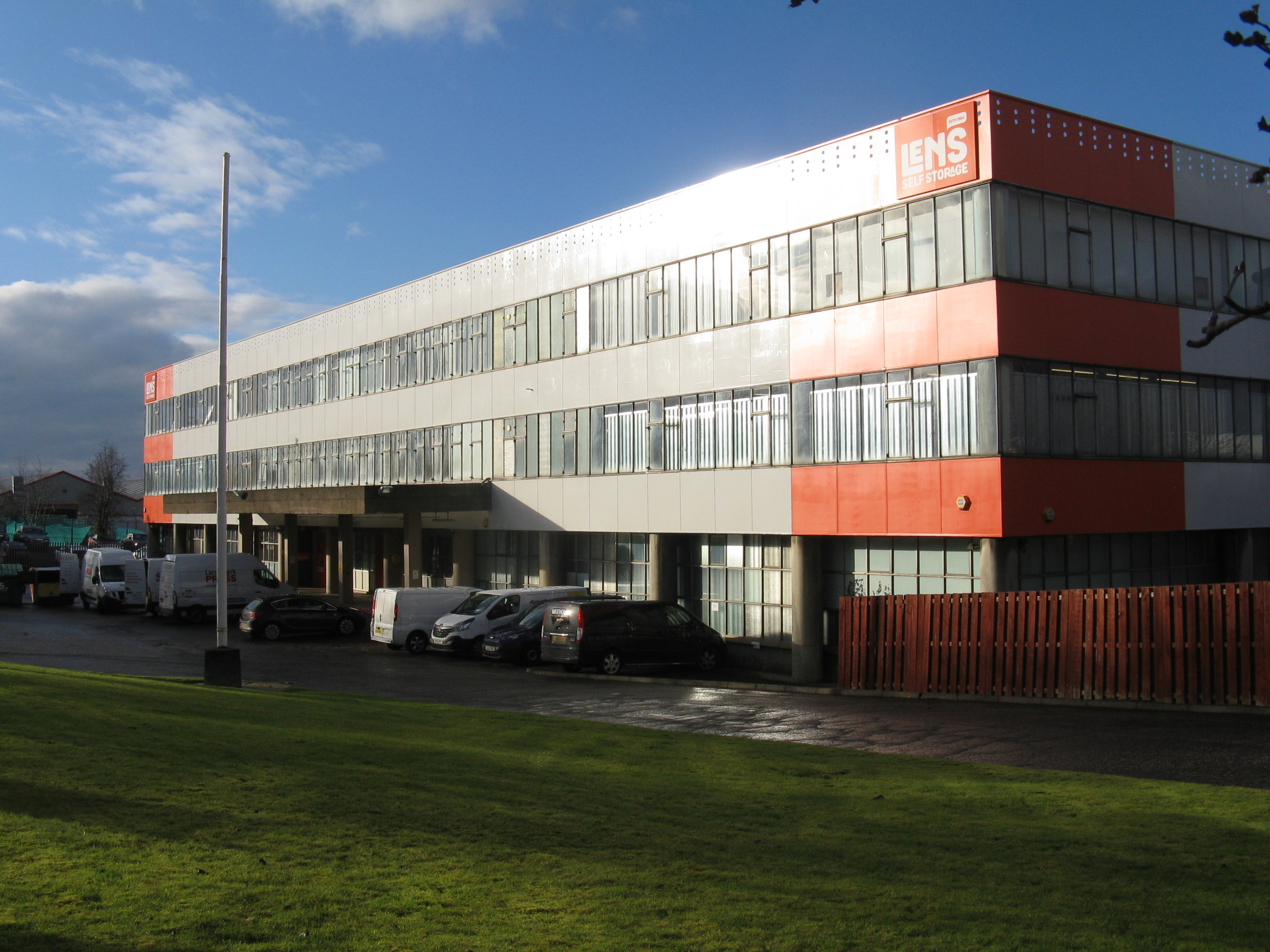
- HMSO Store, February 2017

- Shown in Edinburgh
- 55.92675°N 3.29928°W
- Location: Sighthill Industrial Estate, Edinburgh

History
- Construction started: 31 January 1949
- Built: November 1950
- Built for: His Majesty's Stationery Office
- Original use: Government publications warehouse

Site notes
- Area: Sighthill
- Architect: Stewart Sim
- Architectural style: Modernist architecture
- Current use: Self-service storage

Listed Building – Category A
- Official name: Former HMSO Store, 11 Bankhead Broadway, Sighthill Industrial Estate
- Designated: 29 November 1990
- Reference no.: LB30250

His Majesty's Stationery Office (HMSO) Store, Sighthill is a Category A listed building on the western outskirts of Edinburgh. It is believed to be the first multistorey building in Europe to be constructed with prestressed concrete. It was opened in December 1950 during the reign of King George VI, the building's name was changed to Her Majesty's Stationery Office Store in 1952 with accession of Queen Elizabeth II. Originally the building operated as a warehouse and atelier for HMSO's Scottish operations, but HMSO has ceased to operate the building and it is currently a commercial self-service storage provider.

== Background ==
In December 1946, two British government engineers, Francis Walley and Emil Probst, were sent to Germany and several other European countries to investigate prestressed concrete. This had been deployed on a limited scale during the Second World War, but there were only a few examples in the UK: a former limestone mine in Wiltshire used for ammunition storage had some prestressed beams; two bridges were built using the technique; and railway sleeper production began using prestressed concrete from 1943.

At the time Britain was recovering from wartime damage, there was a rebuilding programme for houses and other buildings, but there were significant constraints on the steel supply needed for this scale of concrete construction. Prestressed concrete used tendons, such as steel wire cables, instead of bulky steel frames, and thus needed significantly less steel overall. Walley quickly appreciated that prestressed concrete was an efficient way of constructing buildings given the circumstances, and pioneered its use. In 1949 Walley designed the Sighthill building as a proof of concept for prestressed concrete in multistorey construction, the first such building in Europe.

Walley's Ministry of Works colleague, Stewart Sim, was the architect for the project, with Webster and Pearson as the structural engineers.

== Construction ==
Construction of the building was contracted to Costain. Since it was the company's first project of this type with prestressed concrete, it was not a straightforward procurement contract. However Costain agreed to contract on the same basis as a traditional steel frame building, taking on the potential financial risk.

The building had an overall floorspace of 75,000 square feet (7,000 m^{2}) with ground floor dimensions of approximately 200 feet (61 m) by 120 feet (37 m). The building had three storeys, with the suspended floors designed for a superimposed load of 336 lb/sq ft (1,640 kg/m^{2}).

The exterior was clad with anodised aluminium panels, with a thickness of 0.125 inch (3.2 mm), which was the first implementation of this sort in the UK.

Some parts of the buildings used reinforced concrete rather than prestressed concrete, namely the liftwells, staircases and the 20 feet (6.1 m) by 30 feet (9.1 m) grid of circular columns that supported each storey.

Construction started in February 1949 and finished in October 1950. During the construction period, the site received around 1,000 visitors, mainly from technical and related professional organisations, and some from overseas, to examine the innovative project.

=== Prestressed concrete beams ===
The focus on prestressed concrete in this project was represented by the construction of the building's concrete beams, for the floors and roof. There were 196 main beams, 18 ft (5.5 m) long, each weighing approximately 5.5 to 9.5 tons, and 752 secondary beams, which weighed 1.25 tons each and were 28 ft (8.5 m) long. The main beam had a wing-shaped ledge on each side, which would be used to support the secondary beams running at right angles to the main beams. The concrete was mixed as 1 cwt (50.8 kilograms) of rapid-hardening Portland cement, 2 cubic feet (56.6 litres) of sand, 2.75 cubic feet (78 litres) of whinstone. This was then mixed with water, to give a water–cement ratio at 0.4 to 0.46 by weight.

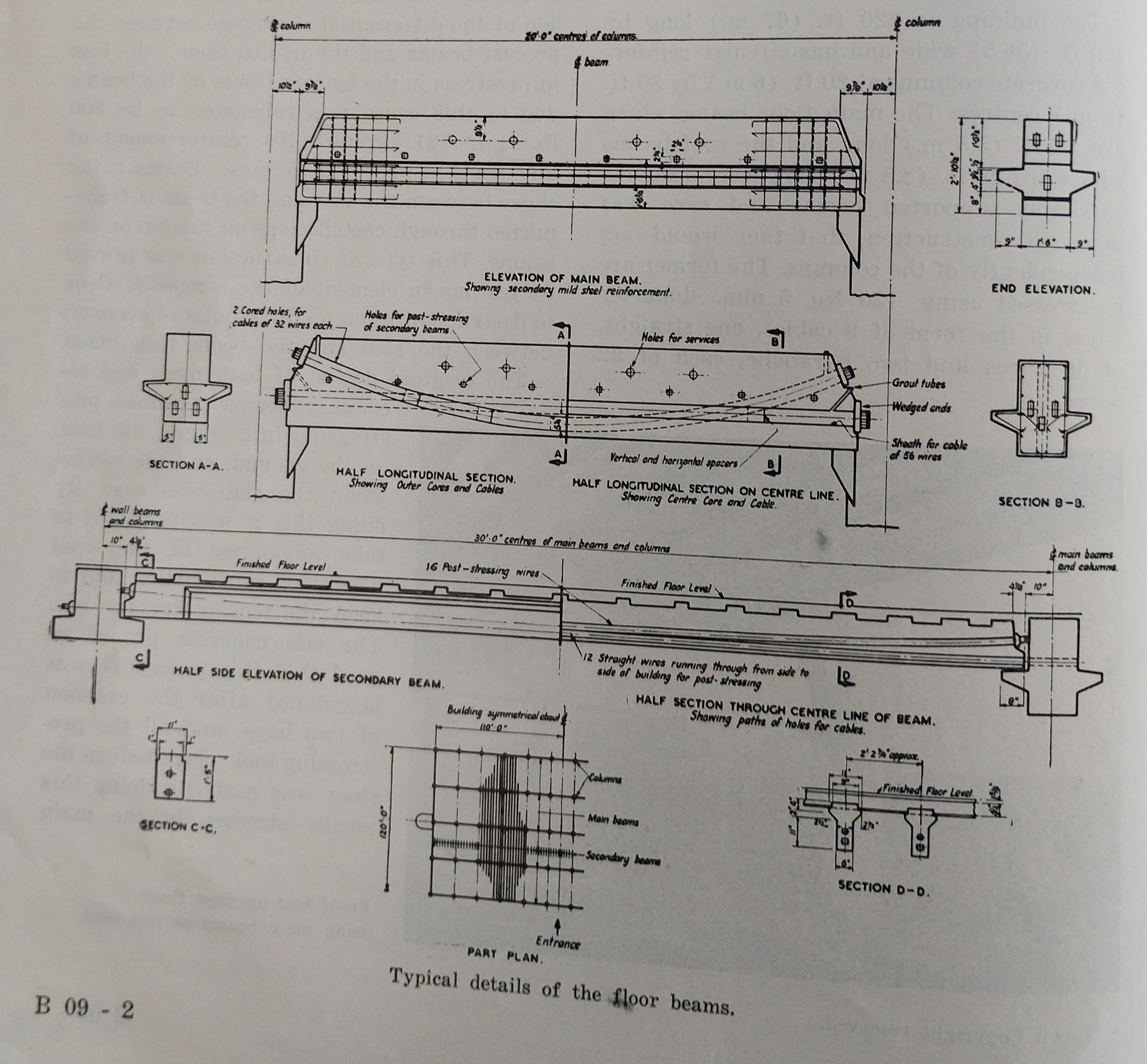
Design of the prestressed concrete beams used in HMSO Store, Sighthill, Scotland

The main beams have three sets of cables running through them, one set of 56 wire cables, which run straight and horizontal through the beam, but the other two sets of cables, with 32 wires each, have a parabolic curve in them. At each end of the beam this pair of cabling was above the straight cable but they curved downwards within the beam to below the level of the straight cable. The secondary beams had two sets of cables running through them, one set straight with 12 wires, and the other set of 16 wires curved upwards through the length of the beam. The wires were made of steel with a diameter of 5 mm.

The secondary roof beams were pretensioned in a factory offsite, while the main beams and the secondary floor beams were cast on the ground floor of the site, and tensioned before being lifted into place. All of the beams employed the Magnel-Blaton anchorage system. The beams were cast at an average rate of 10 per day. The original idea for the main beams was that only the straight cables would be tensioned on the ground, so that the pair of curved cables would be tensioned after being put into their final position. But the contractor decided it would be best to tension all the beams on the ground, so that they would be fully tensioned before the cranes lifted the beams into place. The cables were tensioned using a hydraulic jack set to a stretching force of 3.35 tons. The main beams were tensioned in two stages, with the first performed around 14 days after casting, when the concrete had reached a strength of at least 6,000 pounds per square inch (41.4 megapascals).

== Opening ceremony ==
The building was opened on Saturday 9 December 1950 by Lord Morrison, in his role as parliamentary secretary to the Ministry of Works, with Douglas Jay, Financial Secretary to the Treasury, in attendance. In a speech at the opening ceremony, Morrison said that the total steel usage in the building, including foundations, was 210 tons, instead of the 800 to 950 tons of steel that a traditional design would have required. He hoped that this project had served a useful purpose, in terms of benefit to the civil engineering and building industries.

== Assessment ==
The publicity over the opening did present queries as to why the government was building offices rather than houses, the shortage of which was a particular issue in Scotland at the time. Morrison mentioned the issue in his speech stating that there was also a priority to release back property requisitioned from the owners by the government. He also mentioned that the building was a "guinea pig", a proof of concept. One particular significance of this building was that it used the techniques of precasting and prestressing, as previously used in bridge construction, towards the construction of a full multistoried building. The completion of the HMSO store contributed to the more rapid implementation of the technique and the successful widespread use in Britain.

== Architectural features ==
As of 2017, this building was one of 51 Category A listed buildings in Scotland that were initially completed after the end of World War II in 1945.

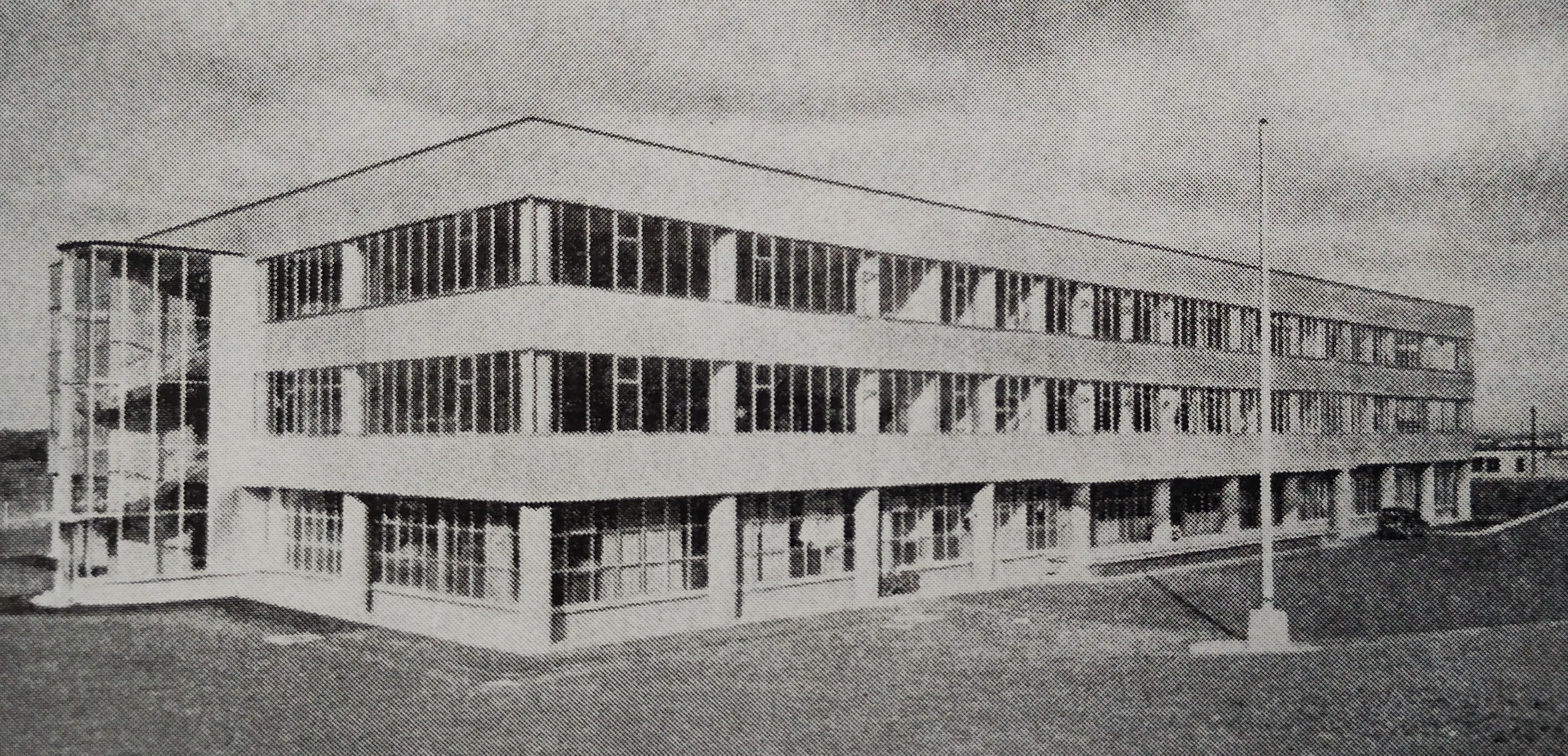
HMSO Store, Sighthill, Edinburgh, November 1950, soon after the building's completion.

The warehouse block was designed in an economical, functionally Modernist style, employing early prestressed concrete frame techniques and anodised aluminium cladding. There are three storeys, with two suspended floors supported by a grid of prestressed beams, anchored to reinforced‑concrete piloti columns. With a ribbed concrete base, the internal partitions were made of plastic. There is a continuous series of steel‑framed windows, set between aluminium panels, to provide light to the storage floors. Rainwater and service pipes are concealed within the structure, with rainwater carried down the beams' centres.

Aethetics were part of this project, with long symmetrical elevations, and vertical glazed stair bays at each end. The original main columns on the building's floors were painted in three pastel colours. The staircases cantilever around a coloured concrete newel, visible through apsidal glazed framed enclosures. Steel rod supported canopies mark the stairway entrances. Canopies were also deployed as shelters for the long loading bay on the building's south side. On the north side there are punched aluminium parapet and porthole openings for the cubic lift‑shaft enclosures.

== Building usage ==
HMSO originally used the facility to consolidate activities that had been spread over several buildings, some of which had been temporarily requisitioned from their owners. Sighthill was the main Edinburgh warehouse and distribution centre for HMSO's publications. It also had a repair shop for office machinery, and a bookbinding workshop.

After HMSO left the site, the building became a self-service storage facility, operated by a local company.
