= Peter Lampl =

British philanthropist

Sir Peter Lampl OBE
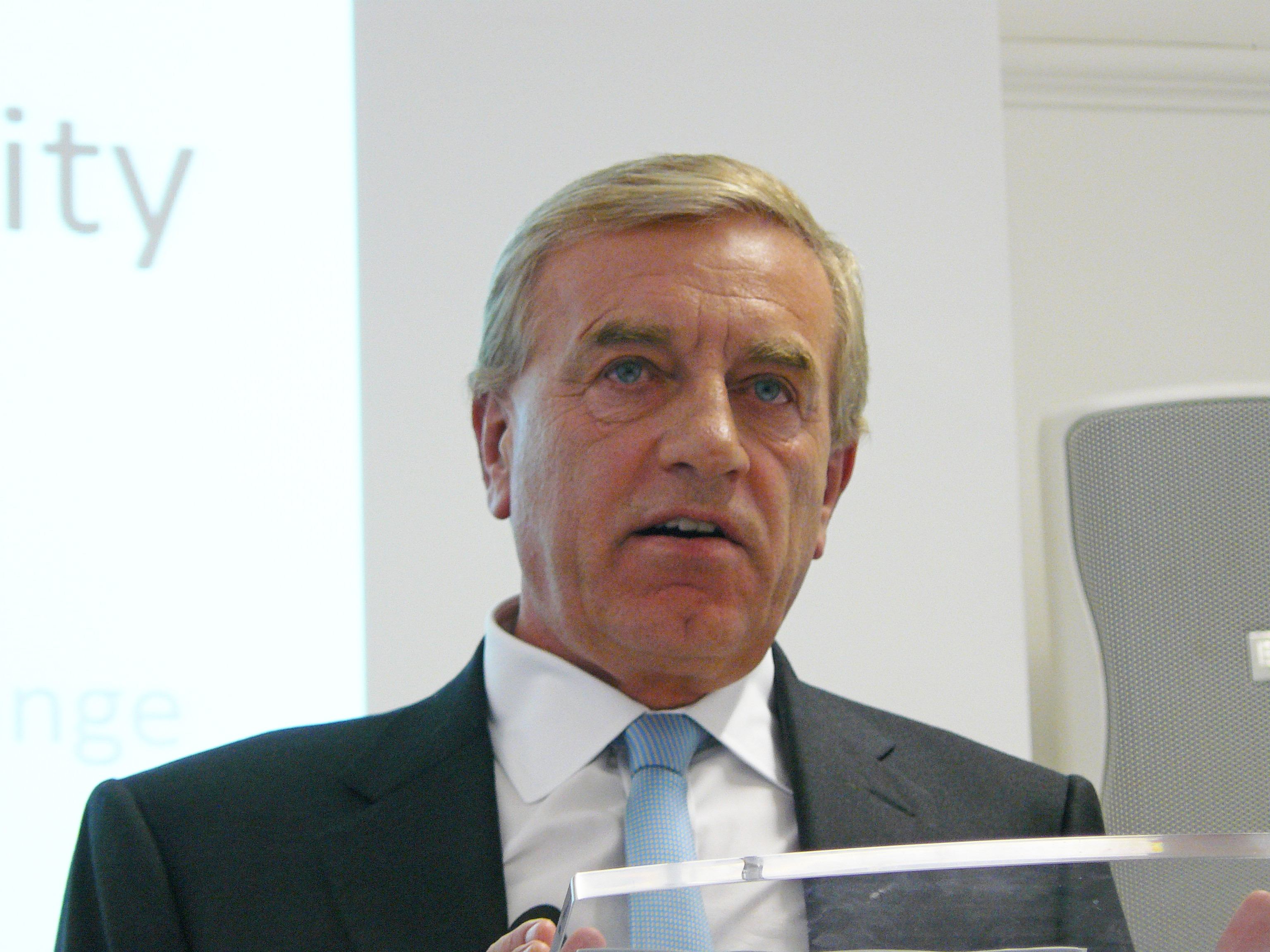
- Peter Lampl speaking at Policy Exchange
- Born: Peter Lampl; 1947 (age 77–78); Borehamwood
- Education: Reigate Grammar School; Cheltenham Grammar School
- Alma mater: Corpus Christi, University of Oxford (BA); London Business School (MBA)
- Employers: Sutton Trust; Education Endowment Foundation; Boston Consulting Group; International Paper

Sir Peter Lampl, OBE (born 1947), is a British philanthropist. He was the founder and chairman of the Sutton Trust and the Education Endowment Foundation.

== Early life and education ==
Lampl's father was a Viennese émigré who came to Britain in 1938. Lampl grew up in Barnsley, Yorkshire, and as the family moved to Surrey when he was 11, he was educated at Reigate Grammar School and Cheltenham Grammar School. He was awarded a Bachelor of Arts degree from the University of Oxford where he was an undergraduate student of Corpus Christi College, Oxford followed by postgraduate study at the London Business School.

== Career ==
Lampl worked outside the UK for over twenty years, initially as a management consultant with the Boston Consulting Group in Boston, Massachusetts, Paris and Munich. He then worked as an executive at International Paper, the world's largest paper and forest products company, where he spent six years in senior management positions.

In 1983, Lampl set up the Sutton Company, a private equity firm with offices in New York City, London and Munich, and by the mid-1990s had become extremely wealthy. Before setting up the Sutton Trust, he funded a campaign to ban handguns in the wake of the Dunblane massacre which resulted in a complete ban on handguns in the UK.

=== Educational philanthropy ===
On his return from America, Lampl was appalled to discover that nowadays "a kid like me had little chance of making it to Oxbridge", noting that his old grammar school was now "all fee-paying" and his old Oxford college "used to have lots of ordinary Welsh kids, but they're not coming through any more."

His first intervention was the creation of the Oxford Summer School, which gave bright 17-year-olds (from families where no one has been to university) the opportunity to spend a week at Oxford living in college, going to seminars and "hanging out with students who are already there." The scheme has since been rolled out to eleven other top universities.

Lampl founded the Sutton Trust in 1997 "to improve educational opportunities for young people from non-privileged backgrounds and increase social mobility." The trust funds a variety of research, campaigning and philanthropical projects, including the "Open Access" programme which funded 70% of places at the academically selective Belvedere School in Liverpool, a scheme which Lampl says the state should eventually expand to 100 or 200 independent day schools who would like to provide "needs-blind" admissions. In this model:

I agree that there will be selection. You are not increasing selection as those [independent] schools are already selective, you are just democratising selection. At present well-off people have the opportunity to opt out of the state sector into what are by and large academically the best schools in the country.... when I was at school you could go to the best academic school in this country for free and that is the way it should be.

Lampl is also chairman of the Education Endowment Foundation which was set up in 2011 by the Sutton Trust with support from Impetus Trust. It was funded by an endowment of £135 million from Government to improve the performance of the poorest children in the worst performing schools.

Lampl was appointed an Order of the British Empire (OBE) in 1999 for services to Access to Higher Education, and knighted in June 2003.

Lampl has Honorary Doctorates from the University of Birmingham, Bristol, Brunel, City University, London, College of Law, Durham, Exeter, Imperial College London, Nottingham, Open University, St Andrews. And Honorary Fellowships from: Birkbeck College (London), Corpus Christi College (Oxford), Institute of Education, London Business School, London School of Economics.
