= Leslie Rees =

Leslie Rees may refer to:

- Leslie Lloyd Rees (1919–2013), Anglican bishop and chaplain
- Leslie Rees (writer) (1905–2000), Australian writer

== See also ==
- Lesley Rees, professor of chemical endocrinology
