= Arnold Hartley Gibson =

British mechanical engineer (1878–1959)

Professor Arnold Hartley Gibson (1878–1959) was a British mechanical engineer who was Professor of Engineering at the University of Manchester from 1920 to 1949. He won a James Alfred Ewing Medal in 1938.
