= James Alfred Ewing Medal =

This is an award of the Institution of Civil Engineers in memory of James Alfred Ewing made by the council on the joint nomination of the president and the President of the Royal Society. It is made to a person, whether a member of the Institution or not, for special meritorious contributions to the science of engineering in the field of research.

== Incomplete list of winners ==
- 1937 Charles Samuel Franklin
- 1938 Prof. Arnold Hartley Gibson
- 1939 Prof. Geoffrey Ingram Taylor
- 1940 ?
- 1941 Dr. Frederick W. Lanchester
- 1942 Dr. Reginald Edward Stradling
- 1943 Group Captain Frank Whittle
- 1944 Barnes Wallis
- 1945 Prof. Richard V. Southwell
- 1946 Sir Clifford Paterson
- 1947 Sir John Cockcroft
- 1948 Sir Edward Appleton
- 1949-51 ?
- 1952 John Fleetwood Baker
- 1953-57 not awarded
- 1958 Sir Claude Inglis
- 1959 ?
- 1960 Karl Terzaghi
- 1961 Sir William Henry Glanville
- 1962 ?
- 1963 Professor Stephen Timoshenko
- 1964-66 ?
- 1967 Sir Alan Howard Cottrell
- 1968 Alec Skempton
- 1969 ?
- 1970 Lord Penney of East Hendred
- 1971 Sir James Lighthill
- 1972-75 ?
- 1976 Sir Eric Eastwood
- 1977 Sir Christopher Cockerell
- 1978 Professor Edward Bullard
- 1979 Professor Sir Alfred Pugsley
- 1980 Professor Olgierd Zienkiewicz
- 1981 Professor Sir Charles Oatley
- 1982 Professor Sir Hugh Ford
- 1983 Professor Peter John Lawrenson
- 1984 Sir Alan Muir Wood
- 1985 Sir Diarmuid Downs
- 1986 Professor John Imbrie
- 1987 Professor William Jason Morgan
- 1988 Professor D. Dowson
- 1989 Dr. C. S. Smith
- 1990 Brigadier Ralph Alger Bagnold
- 1991 Dr. Eric Harold Mansfield
- 1992 Professor J. Michael T. Thompson
- 1993 Professor Andrew N. Schofield
- 1994 Professor William Geraint Price
- 1995 Professor F. Michael Burdekin
- 1996 Professor Vidal Ashkenazi
- 1997 Professor Stephen F. Brown
- 1998 Professor Christopher R. Calladine
- 1999 Professor Arnold L Gordon
- 2000 Professor Joseph L. Reid
- 2001 Professor Sir John Horlock
- 2002 Professor William Alexander Gambling
- 2003 Professor Anthony Kelly (1929-2014)
- 2004 Professor John Spence
- 2005 Professor Anthony Unsworth
- 2006 Professor Patrick J. Dowling
- 2007 Professor William M. Banks
- 2008 Professor Miriam Kastner
- 2009 Professor Adrian Ernest Long
- 2010 William J. Jenkins
- 2011 Professor Joseph Pedlosky
- 2012 Ellen Thomas
- 2013 Mark A. Cane
- 2014 Professor John A. Whitehead
- 2015 Professor Russ E. Davis
- 2016 Peter George Brewer
- 2017 Professor Donald W. Forsyth

== See also ==
- List of engineering awards
