= Becky Francis =

British educationalist and academic

Becky Francis CBE FAcSS FBA
- Born: 7 November 1969 (age 56); Keynsham, Somerset, England

Academic background
- Education: University of Wales, Swansea; University of North London

Academic work
- Discipline: Educationalist
- Sub-discipline: Educational inequality; sex differences in education; primary education; educational attainment
- Institutions: University of Greenwich; London Metropolitan University; Roehampton University; King's College London; Institute of Education, University College London; Education Endowment Foundation

Rebecca Jane Francis, CBE, FAcSS, FBA (born 7 November 1969) is a British educationalist and academic, who specialises in educational inequalities. Since January 2020, she has been Chief Executive of the Education Endowment Foundation (EEF).

== Early life and education ==
Francis was born on 7 November 1969 in Keynsham, Somerset, England. She was educated at the Ralph Allen School, a comprehensive school outside of Bath, Somerset. She studied English at the University of Wales, Swansea, graduating with a Bachelor of Arts (BA) degree in 1992. She then undertook a Doctor of Philosophy (PhD) degree in women's studies and education at the University of North London.

== Career ==
She taught and researched at the University of Greenwich, London Metropolitan University, and Roehampton University. From 2012 to 2016, she was Professor of Education and Social Justice at King's College London.

In 2016, she became the first female director and dean in the 114-year history of the UCL Institute of Education.[1][2] During her tenure, the institute maintained its first-place position for education in the QS World University Rankings.UCL Institute of Education at University College London.

In January 2020, she became the chief executive officer of the Education Endowment Foundation (EEF), an independent charity focused on improving the educational attainment of socio-economically disadvantaged pupils.

Since 2022, Francis has served on the governing board of UNESCO Mahatma Gandhi Institute of Education for Peace and Sustainable Development.

She has also been Director of Education at the Royal Society of Arts (2010–12) and an advisor to the Education Select Committee of the House of Commons since 2015.

In July 2024, the Department for Education appointed her to chair its independent Curriculum and Assessment Review for the English school system." The Review final report was published in November 2025, and the Government accepted the majority of its recommendations.

Since 2025, Francis has been a member of the Economic and Social Research Council (ESRC) Council.

In July 2026, Francis was listed as the most influential person in UK education in Education Business UK's annual rankings.

== Honours ==
Since 2015, Francis has been an elected Fellow of the Academy of Social Sciences (FAcSS).

In 2018, Francis was selected as the inaugural Charles Yidan Global Fellow at the Harward Graduate School of Education.

In 2021, Francis was elected a Fellow of the British Academy (FBA).

Francis was appointed Commander of the Order of the British Empire (CBE) in the 2023 New Year Honours for services to education.

On the 11 September 2024, Francis was awarded an honorary degree: Doctor of Letters (D.Litt.) from the University of Worcester.

== Selected works ==
- Francis, Becky (1998). Power plays: primary school children's constructions of gender, power, and adult work. Staffordshire: Trentham Books. ISBN 978-1858560977.
- Francis, Becky (2000). Boys, girls and achievement: addressing the classroom issues. London: Routledge Falmer. ISBN 978-0415231626.
- Francis, Becky; Skelton, Christine, eds. (2001). Investigating gender: contemporary perspectives in education. Buckingham: Open University Press. ISBN 978-0335207886.
- Francis, Becky; Skelton, Christine, eds. (2003). Boys and girls in the primary classroom. Maidenhead: Open University Press. ISBN 978-0335211555.
- Francis, Becky; Skelton, Christine (2005). Reassessing gender and achievement: questioning contemporary key debates. London: Routledge. ISBN 978-0415333245.
- Skelton, Christine; Francis, Becky, eds. (2005). A feminist critique of education: fifteen years of gender education. London: Routledge. ISBN 978-0415363914.
- Leathwood, Carole; Francis, Becky, eds. (2006). Gender and lifelong learning: critical feminist engagements. London: Routledge. ISBN 978-0415374842.
- Skelton, Christine; Francis, Becky; Smulyan, Lisa, eds. (2006). The Sage Handbook of gender and education. London: SAGE. ISBN 978-1412907927.
- Archer, Louise; Francis, Becky (2006). Understanding minority ethnic achievement: race, gender, class and 'success'. London: Routledge. ISBN 978-0415372817.
- Skelton, Christine; Francis, Becky (2009). Feminism and 'the schooling scandal'. London: Routledge. ISBN 978-0415455091.
- Francis, Becky; Skelton, Christine; Read, Barbara (2012). The identities and practices of high-achieving pupils: negotiating achievement and peer cultures. London: Continuum. ISBN 978-1441157195.
- Francis, Becky; Taylor, Becky; Tereshchenko, Antonina (2020). Reassessing 'ability' grouping: improving practice for equity and attainment. Abingdon, Oxon; New York, NY: Routledge. ISBN 978-1138348837.
