= Eric Harold Mansfield =

English aeronautical engineer (1923–2016)

Eric Harold Mansfield FRS FREng FRAeS FIMA

Chief Scientific Officer, Royal Aircraft Establishment
- In office 1980–1983

Personal details
- Born: 24 May 1923 Croydon, Surrey, England
- Died: 20 October 2016 (aged 93)

Eric Harold Mansfield (24 May 1923 – 20 October 2016) was an aeronautical engineer who won the Royal Medal in 1994, "for his many fundamental and analytical contributions to our knowledge of advanced aeronautical structures, and more recently to the biological sciences."

== Biography ==
Mansfield was born in Croydon, Surrey, England to Harold Goldsmith Mansfield, and Grace Pfundt. He attended St. Lawrence College, Ramsgate, and Trinity Hall, Cambridge. He read Mechanical Sciences at University, graduating in 1943, an earlier intention to read Mathematics being overruled by wartime necessities. Directed to do applied mathematical research on aircraft structures at the Royal Aircraft (later Aerospace) Establishment at Farnborough, he stayed until retiring as Chief Scientific Officer. This was followed by six years as visiting professor at Surrey University where he took as interest in biological and other aspects of surface tension.

He was also a founder member of the Institute of Mathematics and its Applications, and the Royal Academy of Engineering. He was an Elector to the Professorships of Engineering at Cambridge, and served on the Editorial Advisory Board of the International Journal of Non-linear Mechanics and the International Journal of Mechanical Sciences. He was also a Member of the General Assembly of the International Union of Theoretical and Applied Mechanics. He died on 20 October 2016.

== Awards ==
- 1957 awarded Doctorate of Science by Cambridge University
- 1960 elected to the Fellowship of the Royal Aeronautical Society
- 1971 elected Fellow of the Royal Society
- 1991 awarded the James Alfred Ewing Medal by the Institution of Civil Engineers
- 1994 awarded the Royal Medal by the Royal Society
