= Reginald Stradling =

British engineer and scientist (1891-1952

Sir Reginald Edward Stradling CB MC FRS
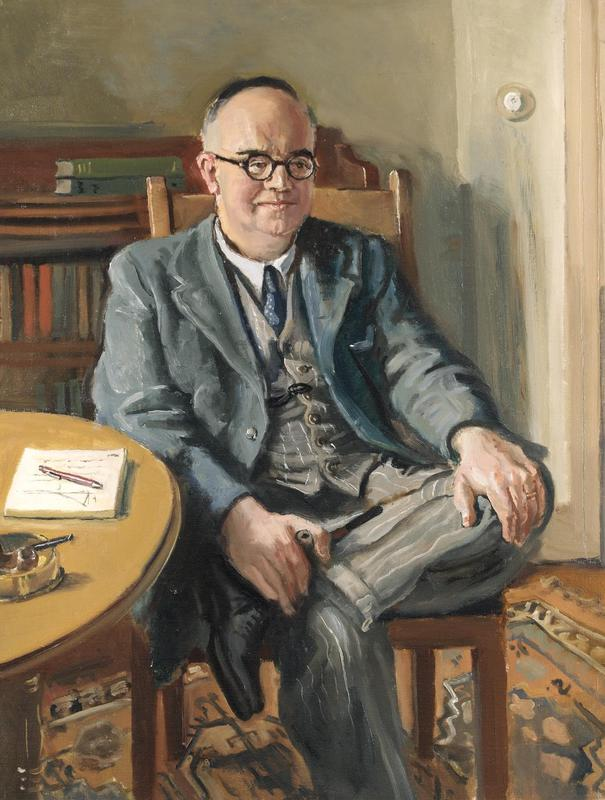
- Painting of Stradling in 1945, by war artist Rodney Joseph Burn
- Born: 12 May 1891; Bedminster, Bristol, County Borough of Bristol
- Died: 26 January 1952 (aged 60); Shrivenham, Oxfordshire
- Resting place: Oxford Crematorium, County Borough of Oxford
- Citizenship: British
- Education: University of Bristol: BSc(Eng) and DSc(Eng); University of Birmingham: PhD
- Occupations: Engineer and government scientist
- Known for: Development of modern building techniques; improvement to civilian defence during WWII
- Spouse: Inda (née Pippard)
- Children: One son, one daughter

Sir Reginald Edward Stradling (12 May 1891 – 26 January 1952) was an engineer and government scientist who had a leading role in the development of modern housing techniques in Britain. He led scientific research into aspects of the Second World War, with a particular interest in improving civilian defence against incendiary bombs dropped during German air raids.

== Early life ==
Reginald Stradling was the second of three children of Edward and Sarah (née Bennet) Stradling. His father was a forage merchant.

Stradling attended Bristol Grammar School. His initial desire was to become a physician, however he had poor eyesight and it was accepted that this would inhibit his medical ambitions. Instead Stradling read engineering at the University of Bristol. This was achieved by winning a scholarship sponsored by the Surveyors Institute, now known as the Royal Institution of Chartered Surveyors (RICS), which would have required him to train as a surveyor at the end of his undergraduate studies. As a student with myopia he was shy and found it hard to develop a social circle. He was interested in the psychical writings of Frederic W. H. Myers, particularly his posthumous book Human Personality and its Survival of Bodily Death, and separately he was attracted to socialism.

After graduating in 1912 he entered into training with the Bristol engineering consultants A. P. I. Cotterell and Son, which specialised in water supply engineering, before taking up posts in Bolton and Birmingham.

== First World War ==
Between 1914 and 1918, Stradling was deployed into the Royal Engineers. He had previously indicated that he was a pacifist, but when war started he volunteered, and Stradling was given a commission. He enjoyed his time in the army, despite maintaining an opposition to war as a concept. He spent part of his service in France, and rose to the rank of captain adjutant to 16 Division at the time of discharge. His physical and mental health began to fail towards the end of the war, but he found that studying psychology helped him get through to the end of his service.

== Academic career ==
After the end of the war, Stradling was released from his obligation to the Surveyors Institute to train as a surveyor. Instead he became a lecturer in civil engineering at the University of Birmingham, where he obtained his PhD in 1922. In the same year he moved to Bradford Technical College in Yorkshire, where he was appointed to the role of head of civil engineering, architecture and building. He obtained his DSc from the University of Bristol in 1925.

== Building Research Station ==
In 1924 Stradling was appointed as Director of the Building Research Station (BRS), now known as the Building Research Establishment, but at that stage a newly created unit within the Department of Scientific and Industrial Research. This was to become his most fruitful period of research activity and a role that he greatly enjoyed. The station was originally in Acton but then moved to Watford. A separate reorganisation moved the equivalent research unit for roads into his department, consequently he acquired the additional title of Director of Road Research.

The purpose of the research station was to promote modern methods of building construction. An example was setting standards and recommendations for the use of steel and steel frames in buildings and bridges, and liaising with the steel industry to assist with supply lines. The BRS researched and tested different building materials for suitability and safety. As the prospect of another war loomed, the BRS turned its attention to civil defence measures.

== Second World War ==
In 1938, in his role as BRS director, Stradling was commissioned by the Home Office to prepare a report on the scientific aspects of civil defence. His report led to the establishment of the Research and Experiments (RE) department of the Air Raid Precautions (ARP) Department initially within the Home Office, and later part of the Ministry of Home Security. He was appointed head of this new department. It was originally based in Horseferry House in Horseferry Road, Westminster, then moved to Cleland House in nearby John Islip Street, and finally was evacuated to a forestry research laboratory near Princes Risborough. Staff numbers rose from an initial 24 to 110 in the first year.

Under Stradling's leadership, a coordinated programme of scientific research and practical work on civil defence was developed, including systematic analysis of German bombing raids and their impact. Twelve sections were eventually set up within the Research and Experiments department, of which RE8 was of particular note. This was originally known as the "Appreciation" section, but from 1942 was restructured under the title of "Operational Research". It performed analysis on bombs and their explosive impact, and made recommendations to the public as to how to reduce the risks to them, such as by the design of entrances to bomb shelters and how to minimise injuries from shattered window panes. Stradling made use of former University of Bristol engineering colleagues, including John Baker. This research had implications for attack operations as well as defence. One of the areas that became a part of civilian life at this time was the rollout of Anderson and Morrison air raid shelters. The Anderson shelter was designed before the creation of Research and Experiments, but in due course both shelters were specified, tested and modified by the RE department.

In 1944 Stradling became chief scientific adviser to the Ministry of Works to advise on post-war rebuilding efforts, particularly non-traditional approaches to housing. This was a pressing matter in terms of national priorities, given the damage caused by the war, the number of troops returning home, and the expectations of the public. Against this was the conservatism of the building industry which was not always responsive to new ways of working. Part of the answer came in the form of prefabricated housing. He advocated the use of steel-framed, prestressed and reinforced concrete techniques.

== Career after 1945 ==
Stradling's spell as chief scientific adviser was relatively short, due to health issues in early 1949. Consequently the government offered him the role as dean of the Military College of Science in Shrivenham, Oxfordshire. This was a part-time role.

== Personal life and death ==
He married Inda (née Pippard) in 1918, they had one son and one daughter.

Reginald Stradling died on 26 January 1952 at the Military College of Science. His body was cremated at Oxford Crematorium on 30 January 1952, in a service led by a Methodist minister.

== Assessment ==
After his death, a senior civil servant at the Home Office said that Stradling's research and advisory efforts during World War II had immense value in respect of civilian defence against incendiary bombs, and was a pioneering example of operational research. "All who worked with or for him will remember him as a loyal and enthusiastic colleague, an inspiring chief, and a kind friend." His loyalty was represented by his friendship and offers of help to Emil Probst, a Germany based engineer whose Jewish ancestry led to him fleeing to the United Kingdom after the rise of the Nazi régime. Probst later became a British citizen. The irony was that Stradling and Probst had both been awarded military crosses from their respective governments for similar service in opposing sides of World War One. Stradling rated Probst's abilities as an academic engineer, and helped Probst with job opportunities.

== Recognition ==
For his service in the First World War, Stradling was awarded the Military Cross, and was twice mentioned in dispatches. He was made a Companion of the Order of the Bath in the 1934 Birthday Honours list, and awarded a knighthood in the 1945 New Year Honours list.

Stradling was made an honorary associate of RIBA in 1926, in 1939 he was elected to the council of the Institution of Civil Engineers, became vice-president in 1945 and was due to become president in 1949, until ill health meant that he had to withdraw his nomination.

In 1942 he was awarded the James Alfred Ewing Medal by the Institution of Civil Engineers. He was made a fellow of the Royal Society in 1943. He was awarded the United States' Medal for Merit in 1947, for his research into explosives, which contributed to the United States' development of the atomic bomb. The medal's citation included the following sentences: "He welcomed and trained many young Americans at his Princes Risborough Station in the techniques he had discovered. Sir Reginald's contributions were of invaluable aid to the Allies in time of great peril."
