= Francis Walley =

British structural engineer (1918–2012)

Francis Walley CB FICE FIStructE FREng
- Born: 30 December 1918; Hereford, England
- Died: 18 October 2012 (aged 93); Hastings, England
- Education: Cheltenham Grammar School
- Alma mater: University of Bristol
- Occupation: Structural engineer
- Known for: Pioneering the use of prestressed concrete
- Notable work: Former HMSO warehouse, Edinburgh, Blue Bridge in St James's Park, London

Francis Walley (30 December 1918 – 18 October 2012) was a British structural engineer and civil servant, who had a key role in advancing the use of prestressed concrete. During the Second World War he became an expert in the blast impact of explosives on concrete. Therefore much of his work no longer exists, and some of it destroyed by Walley himself. One notable structure to have survived this destructive onslaught is the Blue Bridge, a footbridge that crosses the lake in the centre of St James's Park in London.

== Early years ==
Francis Walley was born in Hereford, as the youngest of five children. His father, Reginald Walley, was a customs and excise officer, his mother was Maria (née Thomas). His eldest brother was to become Sir John Walley, a senior civil servant in the Ministry of Pensions and National Insurance, who had a significant part in the roll-out of the Beveridge reforms.

== Education ==
Walley attended Cheltenham Grammar School and then went on to the University of Bristol. He wanted to take a degree in forestry, but he ended up studying engineering under John Baker, at that stage the professor of the department — he was later to become Lord Baker. Baker developed the 'plastic theory of design', which when used with steel structures gave a lower bound calculation before load collapse. This became a central theory to Walley's future career in the fields of explosives and concrete. At Bristol he met Margaret Probert, who was studying languages and who became his wife in 1946. Walley obtained a First for his undergraduate degree. He later obtained a master's degree in 1945 and a PhD in 1968.

== Early career ==
His first full-time job was with Westland Aircraft, where one of his early assignments was to design an automated valve for Westland Welkin fighter aircraft, the world's first pressurised aircraft, which had previously been prone to depressurisation faults.

== Wartime deployments ==
Walley spent the war studying and advising in the use of explosives. His first such role was in 1941 as part of the Ministry of Home Security. Initially, and at Baker's behest, this resulted in a study of how to improve the protective qualities of bomb shelters, which became the subject of his master's degree. His work was both on the defensive side, how to protect from explosives, and also on the attack side: how to inflict the greatest damage, such as on underground factories in Germany and occupied France. In 1943 he went to Italy, on behalf of the Chief of the Imperial General Staff (CIGS) to study the Allied bombing of Pantelleria. Later he was involved with using explosives as a mechanism to clear mines. He was injured in 1944 due to a premature detonation. He also went to France to study the impact of wartime bombing around Calais, which including his destroying German gun emplacements.

In 1945 he went to Japan to investigate the impact of the atomic bombings of Hiroshima and Nagasaki, as part of a joint UK and US team, again on behalf of CIGS. In 1953 he went to Australia to research the impact of atomic bomb explosions in nuclear weapons tests held there. As a result he became known as Britain's foremost expert in the assessment of blast effects on structures, and in the ways to mitigate blast damage.

== Prestressed concrete ==
Prestressed concrete originated in France and Germany, with an early patent issued in 1928. It was a technique for constructing concrete structures with relatively little steel, compared to the heavy steel frames used in earlier buildings. Instead the concrete would have tendons, typically steel cables, running inside or just outside the concrete, which could be tensioned during the construction process. When the tension was released towards the end of the process, the tendons would compress the concrete, thus strengthening it and enabling the structure to be placed into service already prestressed to its maximum strength. In the post-war reconstruction era, when steel production in Britain and across Europe suffered from a large excess of demand over supply, the use of prestressed concrete allowed for buildings and other infrastructure to be constructed quickly, relatively cheaply and without adding further pressure on to the steel industry.

Francis Walley's career had a turning point in December 1946 when he was invited to accompany Emil Probst on a tour of Europe, to research concrete developments that had taken place during the war. Probst was a former professor at the Karlsruhe Institute of Technology and a noted expert on concrete. They visited examples of prestressed concrete in France, Switzerland, Belgium and Germany, and as the technical secretary to the government's Standard Flats Committee Walley realised the far-reaching potential of the technique.

Back in the UK, Walley initiated a programme of testing, wrote up the findings, published Prestressed Concrete: Design and Construction in 1953, authored a Code of Practice (known as CP115) in 1957, and undertook lectures to share the findings. His wife was not spared this rush of enthusiasm: she used her linguistic skills to help Francis Walley with the translation of a key technical manual by Gustave Magnel from German into English in 1948. He designed the WR range of bridge beams in 1948 for Costain Concrete, the first manufactured and standardised bridge beams for prestressed concrete, variants of which are still used by the construction industry and which were considered a landmark development. One reason for his activities was that by putting information into the public domain it would help to prevent any additional patents being granted: Walley was fearful of the potential cost implications for public bodies. He promoted the use of prestressed concrete in his different roles in the civil service, and this played a notable part in the reconstruction of Britain, and other countries, in the aftermath of the damage caused by World War II.

His first significant structure using this technique was the former His Majesty's Stationery Office (HMSO) warehouse (Note: Some sources erroneously refer to a GPO building in Sighthill. In his Sutherland History Lecture, delivered on 9 March 2000 to the Institution of Structural Engineers, Walley identified the building as the former HMSO building.) in Sighthill, Edinburgh. Walley was the building's designer, with his Ministry of Works colleague Stewart Sim as architect, deploying innovative and economic functional Modernism on a large warehouse block. This was the first multistorey building in Europe built using prestressed concrete. It was officially opened on 9 December 1950. The warehouse was given a Category A listing in 1990 by Historic Scotland, the highest level of building protection.

== Post-war career ==
After the end of the Second World War Walley joined the civil service as a structural engineer and worked in several different departments.

Walley started in the Ministry of Works in 1945 as an engineer with design responsibilities. In 1962 he was appointed superintending engineer, which ended most of his design work, and then in 1965 deputy director of building development. He had a period working as director of the Estate Management Overseas in 1969, which led to his involvement in the siting of the British Embassy in Moscow, and a UK government supported highway in Nepal. He had a sideways move in 1971 as director of Post Office services, at that time a central government agency within the civil service with a large property portfolio. In 1973 he was transferred to the new Department of the Environment as under-secretary director of Civil Engineering Services until 1976. His final civil service role, which took him until retirement in 1978 was as director of civil engineering with the Property Services Agency, thus marking his return to the successor body to the Ministry of Works.

Walley was involved with the government's efforts in setting up a series of research laboratories, including the construction of the Atomic Weapons Research Establishment in Foulness, and was involved with building the testing facility for Concorde at Farnborough Airport, where he worked with his brother-in-law, Rhys Probert. He designed structures for the Blue Streak missile project in Spadeadam, Cumbria, which he described as probably the most expensive concrete ever made. The missile project was abandoned, but one of the silos has become a Scheduled Monument and thus protected. He supervised the building of the One-Mile Telescope for Cambridge University in 1963, a new glasshouse structure at the Royal Botanic Gardens Edinburgh in 1967, and structural repairs to the Post Office Tower in London, after a bomb exploded inside the building in 1971.

In the summer of 1968 Walley attended the Ronan Point inquiry, chaired by Hugh Griffiths, as a member of the team of experts. This investigated the partial collapse of a block of flats in Canning Town after a gas explosion in May 1968.

== Blue Bridge, St James's Park ==
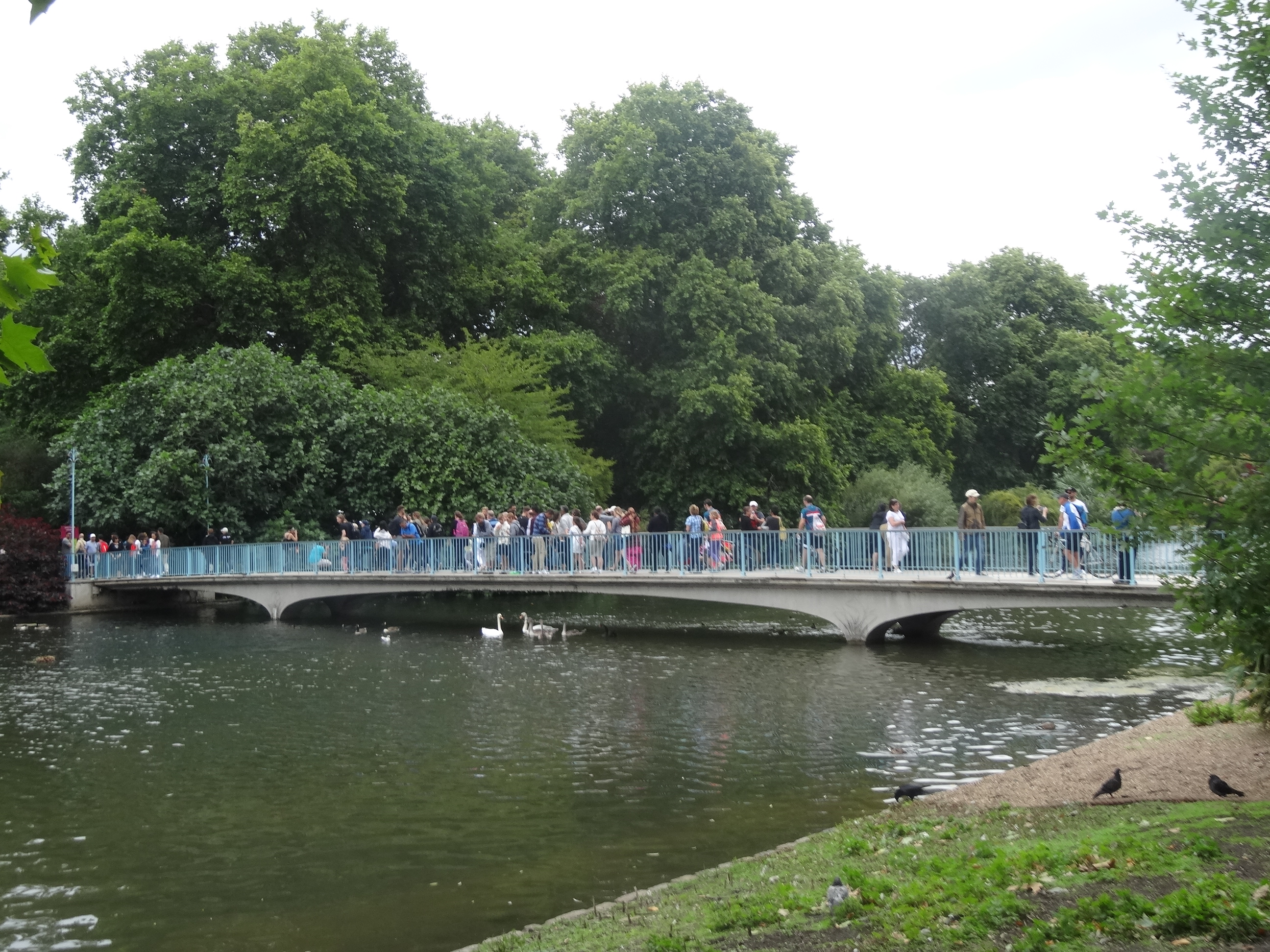
The Blue Bridge, St James's Park, London

The Blue Bridge, sometimes known as the Bridge of Spies, in St. James's Park, London, is Walley's most visited legacy. It stretches over the park's lake, on the main pedestrian thoroughfare through the park. The architect was Eric Bedford, and Francis Walley was the structural engineer. It replaced a one hundred year old iron suspension bridge which had become expensive to maintain, and was made using white Portland stone as the aggregate for the prestressed concrete, the first time this arrangement had been used. Prestressed concrete was a particularly useful application of the technology since with a pedestrian bridge it would be possible to estimate the maximum potential load. The nature of prestressed concrete meant that a relatively straightforward set of mathematical calculations could be completed ahead of construction to guarantee the bridge's load-bearing abilities without further modifications. The bridge's concrete was cast over a single night, beginning on 6 June 1957.

Walley later said it was not the load stress that concerned him, but the frequency - how the bridge reacts to oscillations. The bridge's keynote position in the heart of London meant that Walley was not prepared to take chances. Among the precautions taken, Walley was to orchestrate the march of 300 guardsmen, based at the nearby Wellington Barracks, over the newly cast bridge, to assess the structure's performance, before the public opening. (Note: There is a photograph of the guardsmen marching on the bridge in The Structural Engineer volume 79 issue 4, page 20.) He wrote about his engineering approach in a paper presented to the Institution of Civil Engineers.

== Retirement ==
After retirement in 1978 he spent more time in his home in Coulsdon, where he lived in the same house for 63 years, working on the garden and beekeeping. He and his wife were stalwarts of the local Methodist church, which structurally benefited from his unpaid stewardship. He was a letter writer to engineering journals and stayed active in the Institution of Structural Engineers, of which he was vice-president in 1982-83 and honorary secretary from 1979 to 1981. He was also elected to the council of the Institution of Civil Engineers from 1978 to 1981. He acted as a consultant to Ove Arup and Partners from 1979.

== Death ==
Illness and ageing led to Walley and his wife moving from Coulsdon to Hastings in March 2012, to be closer to one of their two daughters. He died of heart failure in Hastings on 18 October 2012.

== Legacy ==
After his death, Mike Puttnam, chairman of Network Rail, wrote in the New Civil Engineer journal that Walley was an unassuming man who was "one of the most innovative and influential structural engineers of the 20th-century." His biographer in the Dictionary of National Biography said that the ethos of public service pervaded his whole life. His promotion of prestressed concrete had a significant role in shaping the urban landscape of Britain and other countries.

== Recognition ==
He was appointed a Companion the Order of the Bath in 1978 when he retired. He was a fellow of the Institution of Chartered Engineers, the Institution of Structural Engineers, and the Royal Academy of Engineering. The latter was originally awarded when it was the Fellowship of Engineering, the academy's previous name.
