= Vidal Ashkenazi =

Vidal Ashkenazi (1933–2026) was a Turkish geodesist who taught at the University of Nottingham for 33 years. He won a Harold Spencer Jones award from the Royal Institute of Navigation and an Alfred Ewing Medal. Ashkenazi was awarded an OBE in the 2017 New Year Honours for services to Science.
