= J. Michael T. Thompson =

British mathematician

Professor John Michael Tutill Thompson
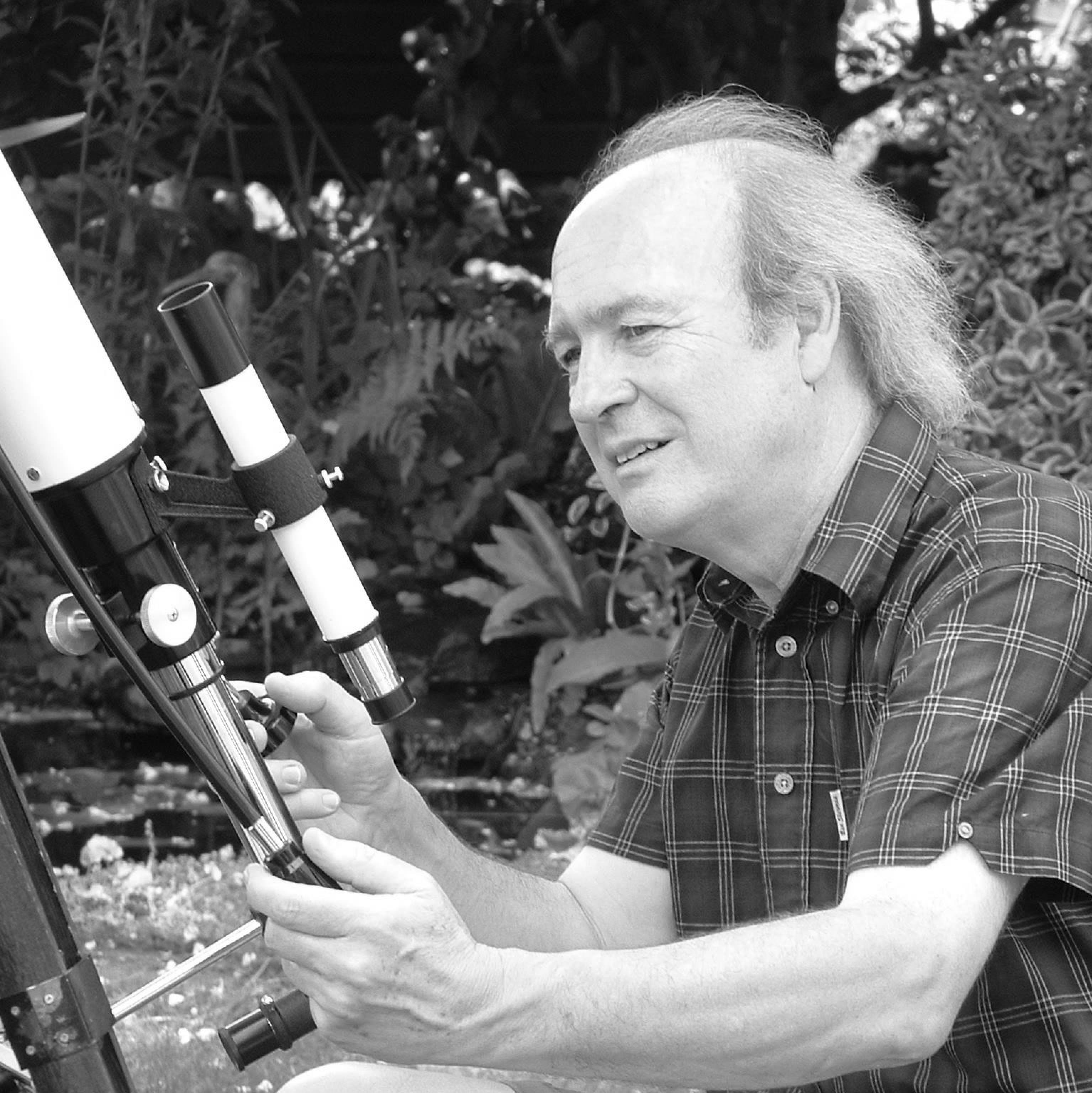
- Professor J. Michael T. Thompson
- Born: June 7, 1937 (age 89); Cottingham, England
- Occupations: Honorary Fellow, Department of Applied Mathematics & Theoretical Physics, Cambridge University, Emeritus Professor of Nonlinear Dynamics, Dept of Civil, Environmental & Geomatic Engineering, University College London
- Known for: Shell buckling and nonlinear dynamics
- Awards: James Alfred Ewing Medal (1992), Lyapunov Award of ASME (2013)

Academic background
- Education: Cambridge University
- Doctoral advisor: (Lord) Henry Chilver

John Michael Tutill Thompson (born 7 June 1937 in Cottingham, England) is an Honorary Fellow in the Department of Applied Mathematics and Theoretical Physics at the University of Cambridge. He is married with two children.

== Education and career ==
Thompson attended the Hull Grammar School, and studied Mechanical Sciences at Cambridge University (Clare College, 1955–61), winning the three top prizes of the Engineering Faculty: the Rex Moir Prize for Part I of the Tripos, the Archibald Denny Prize for Part II, and the John Winbolt Prize for a research essay. His doctoral thesis (PhD, 1962) under the supervision of (Lord) Henry Chilver was devoted to the buckling of thin spherical shells. He spent three more years at Cambridge as a research fellow at Peterhouse.

He joined the department of Civil and Environmental Engineering at University College London (UCL) in 1964, where he was professor from 1977-2002. Here he built up an internationally recognized group in structural stability, organized an IUTAM (International Union of Theoretical and Applied Mechanics) Symposium and wrote an authoritative book on the underlying general theory. Two more books on the buckling of engineering structures quickly followed and he was elected as a Fellow of the Royal Society in 1985.

His research interests were shifting to dynamics and his book Nonlinear Dynamics and Chaos (1986) sold 14,000 copies and had a major world-wide impact by introducing recent mathematical developments to engineers and applied scientists. His research activity in this period included the discovery of chaos in impacting system, and the establishment of a new design criterion for the integrity of systems against basin erosion by incursive fractals.

He was a senior fellow of the UK Science and Engineering Research Council (1988–93). He also was the founder and director of the UCL Centre for Nonlinear Dynamics and its Applications (1991-2002) which was renowned for its application of advanced mathematics to practical problems in (for example) off-shore engineering. The centre hosted an IUTAM Symposium in 1993, and Thompson was for 10 years (1998-2007) a vigorous and innovative editor of the Philosophical Transactions of the Royal Society of London, the world’s longest running scientific journal. His later research developed the static-dynamic analogy, delineating spatial chaos in twisted rods and buckling cylinders; together with some ideas regarding climate change.

A workshop in Thompson's honour was held at UCL in April, 2003. The proceedings, published in the journal Nonlinear Dynamics included a biographical article by Lord Chilver. Later, for his 75th birthday, a special issue of Phil. Trans. R. Soc. was edited by Isaac Elishakoff, for which Thompson wrote a paper offering advice to young researchers.

== Appointments ==
- Fulbright Research Associate, Dept. Aeronautics & Astronautics, Stanford University (1962-3)
- Lecturer & Professor, Civil & Environmental Engineering, University College London (1964-2002)
- Visiting Professor, Faculté des Sciences, Université Libre de Bruxelles (1976-8)
- Visiting Mathematician, Brookhaven National Laboratory, New York (1984)
- Senior Fellow of the UK Science and Engineering Research Council (1988–93)
- Distinguished 6th Century Chair, Theoretical & Applied Dynamics, University of Aberdeen 2006-16
- Honorary Fellow, Dept Applied Maths & Theoretical Physics, Cambridge University (2003–present)

== IUTAM Symposia organised at UCL ==
- Collapse: the buckling of structures in theory and practice, 1982
- Nonlinearity and chaos in engineering dynamics, 1993

== Principal honours and awards ==
- Sc.D. (Cambridge), 1977
- Council of the Institute of Mathematics and its Applications, 1989–92
- Fellow of the Royal Society, 1985. Elected to the Council, 11 July 2002
- OMAE Award, American Society of Mechanical Engineers (ASME), 1985
- James Alfred Ewing Medal, Institution of Civil Engineers & the Royal Society, 1992
- Editor, Philosophical Transactions of the Royal Society (A), 1998-2007
- Honorary Doctor of Science (DSc), University of Aberdeen, 2004
- Gold Medal of the Institute of Mathematics and its Applications, for lifetime contributions to mathematics, 2004
- Hungarian Academy of Sciences, elected Honorary Member, 2010
- Academy of Europe (Academia Europaea), elected to Academy, 2010
- Lyapunov Award (American Society of Mechanical Engineers) for work in nonlinear dynamics, 2013

== Books published ==
- A General Theory of Elastic Stability, Wiley, London, 1973
- Instabilities & Catastrophes in Science and Engineering, Wiley, Chichester, 1982 (Translations: Russian, Japanese)
- Elastic Instability Phenomena, Wiley, Chichester, 1984
- Nonlinear Dynamics and Chaos, geometrical methods for engineers and scientists, Wiley, Chichester, 1986 (Translations: Japanese, Italian). Second Edition, 2002.

== Sources ==
- Who’s Who 2016 (copyright © A & C Black, an imprint of Bloomsbury Publishing plc)
- JMT Thompson’s Home page: http://www.homepages.ucl.ac.uk/~ucess21
