= Alec Gambling =

British electrical engineer (1926–2021)

Professor Alec Gambling FRS FREng

BT Professor of Optical Communication, University of Southampton
- In office 1980–1995

Professor of Electronics, University of Southampton
- In office 1964–1980

Personal details
- Born: William Alexander Gambling; 11 October 1926
- Died: 9 January 2021 (aged 94) Spain

William Alexander Gambling FRS (11 October 1926 – 9 January 2021) was a British electrical engineer known for pioneering work in the field of optoelectronics.

== Life ==
From 1950 to 1955, he was lecturer in electric power engineering at the University of Liverpool. He taught at the University of Southampton and was dean of Engineering and Applied Sciences from 1972 to 1975.

He was president of Institution of Electronic and Radio Engineers in 1978. In 1979, he was elected a Fellow of the Royal Academy of Engineering, and Fellow of the Royal Society in 1983.

He was BT professor of optical communications from 1980 to 1995 and founder and director of the Optoelectronics Research Centre from 1989 to 1995.

He was Royal Society Kan Tong Po visiting professor at the University of Hong Kong from 1996 to 2001. He was director of Research and Development at Optoelectronics LTK Industries Ltd from 2002 to 2007.

He was awarded the James Alfred Ewing Medal in 2002. He died in Spain on 9 January 2021.

== Works ==
- Electronics in transition, University of Southampton, 1968
- Photons and fibres: the new world of communications, Royal Academy of Engineering, 1992
- S. T. Lee, P. S. Chung, William Alexander Gambling, C. S. Lee, Papers presented at the Asia-Pacific Symposium on Organic Electrolumuniscent Materials and Devices, City University of Hong Kong, 2000
