= Lesley Rees =

Dame Lesley Howard Rees DBE
- Born: 17 November 1942
- Education: St Bartholomew's Hospital Medical College
- Awards: DBE
- Scientific career
- Fields: Endocrinology
- Workplaces: St Bartholomew's Hospital Medical College

Dame Lesley Howard Rees DBE is a British professor, medical doctor, and endocrinologist. She was Dean of St Bartholomew's Hospital Medical College (Bart's) from 1989 to 1995, the first and only woman to hold this post. Rees led the college to a successful merger with the London Hospital Medical College as part of Queen Mary University of London in 1995. She is currently emeritus professor of chemical endocrinology at Bart's.

Rees was educated at Pate's Grammar School for Girls, Cheltenham. Rees studied at Bart's and qualified in 1965. She went on to specialise in clinical endocrinology and was appointed professor of chemical endocrinology in 1980. She also became the University of London's public orator, the first science graduate to hold this post. She has published more than 300 articles in peer-reviewed journals, and in 1980 delivered the Goulstonian lecture of the Royal College of Physicians.

In 1983, as subdean at Bart's, Rees "was given" the task of reforming medical education. An innovative development was the building of a Clinical Skills Laboratory for medical students, nursing and midwifery training. This was modelled on a laboratory at the University of Limburg in Maastricht which had been shown to raise the performance of clinical skills in medical students.

In 1984, Rees became the first woman to serve as chairman of the UK Society for Endocrinology and was awarded its Jubilee Medal in 1989. She was chair of the editorial board of the society's academic journal Clinical Endocrinology for 10 years until 2010. She served as Secretary General of the International Society of Endocrinology, the first time the post was held outside the USA.

Rees became the first Director of Education at the Royal College of Physicians in 1997. In 2001, Rees was awarded a DBE for services to medical education.

== Personal life ==
She is a niece of the conductor, Sir Colin Davis.
