= Education Endowment Foundation =

British charitable organization

Education Endowment Foundation (EEF)
- Education Endowment Foundation (EEF) logo
- Founded: 2011
- Purpose: Education
- Headquarters: London, England
- Executive Chair: Dame Christine Gilbert CBE
- Chief Executive: Professor Becky Francis CBE (FBA, FAcSS, PhD)
- Website: https://educationendowmentfoundation.org.uk/

The Education Endowment Foundation (EEF) is a charity established in 2011 to improve the educational attainment of the poorest pupils in English schools. It aims to support teachers and senior leaders by providing evidence-based resources designed to improve practice and boost learning.

On its creation, the EEF became the biggest funder of schools research in England.

== History ==
The Education Endowment Foundation (EEF) was founded in 2011 by lead charity the Sutton Trust, in partnership with Impetus Trust (now part of Impetus - Private Equity Foundation), with a £125 million founding grant from the Department for Education.

The EEF was initiated in November 2010, when the Secretary of State for Education, Michael Gove, announced plans to establish an education endowment foundation intended to help raise standards in challenging schools, inspired by the Obama administration's Race to the Top initiative in the US.

The EEF was formally launched in July 2011, with Chairman Sir Peter Lampl declaring its aim would be to "develop initiatives to raise the attainment of the poorest pupils in the most challenging schools". The EEF took over from the Sutton Trust the development of the Teaching and Learning Toolkit, and Sir Kevan Collins, former Chief Executive of the London Borough of Tower Hamlets, was appointed the EEF's first chief executive.

In 2012, the EEF was awarded a further £10 million by the Department for Education to identify and evaluate high-potential interventions aimed at improving literacy for 10 and 11 year-olds at the transition from primary to secondary school.

In October 2019, it was announced that Professor Becky Francis would replace Sir Kevan Collins as chief executive of the EEF.

== Activities ==
=== Teaching and Learning Toolkit ===
The Sutton Trust-EEF Teaching and Learning Toolkit was developed from the Pupil Premium Toolkit commissioned by the Sutton Trust and produced by Durham University in May 2011. The Toolkit summarises the findings of more than 13,000 trials from around the world.

=== Projects ===
In the autumn of 2012, the EEF announced trials of its first four grant-funded projects. Since 2012, the EEF has funded a total of 145 projects involving 9,400 schools, nurseries and colleges.

In 2014, the EEF published its first independent project evaluation. To date, 84 evaluations have been published, with the majority of these designed as randomised controlled trials. The EEF have commissioned more than 10 per cent of all known trials in education around the world.

=== Families of Schools database ===
The EEF Families of Schools database, launched in 2015, is an interactive tool that puts schools into families of 50 based on factors including prior attainment, percentage of pupils eligible for free school meals and the number of children with English as an additional language. The attainment of pupils on a range of measures can then be compared with similar schools.

It allows schools to understand the size and nature of their attainment gap in relation to other similar institutions and provides new information, with the aim of helping schools to learn from the best performing school in each family.

=== Early years ===
In 2014, the EEF extended its remit to include early years, with the aim of developing an understanding of how to support the learning of 3-4 year olds, in particular those eligible for free school meals.

The EEF launched the Early Years Toolkit in 2015, which aims to provide guidance for early years professionals on how to use their resources to improve the learning of disadvantaged children. The toolkit covers 12 topics and summarises research from 1,600 studies.

=== Research Schools Network ===
The Research Schools Network is a collaboration between the EEF and the Institute for Effective Education (IEE) to create a network of schools to support the use of evidence to improve teaching practice.

Research Schools act as regional hubs for the Research Schools Network. Through the network, they attempt to share what they know about putting research into practice, and support schools to make better use of evidence to inform their teaching and learning.

Launched in 2016, the Network initially consisted of 11 schools. In 2017, Education Secretary Justine Greening announced plans to set up 12 new research schools in the government's "opportunity areas" – identified as social mobility 'coldspots' – areas with both poor social mobility and schools that face challenges.

The Network currently numbers 32 schools.

=== International partnerships ===
In 2014, the EEF began working with school systems in Australia to develop an Australian version of the Teaching and Learning Toolkit, taking the global evidence base that underpins the Toolkit and contextualising it with recent examples of local research to enhance its relevance for Australian teachers.

The Australian work was joined in February 2017 by the work of Education Scotland, which has led to the development of a Scottish version of the Toolkit to strengthen the use of evidence underpinning the Scottish Attainment Challenge.

In July 2017, the EEF entered into a new partnership in Latin America and the Caribbean with SUMMA (the Laboratory of Education Research and Innovation for Latin America and the Caribbean).

== See also ==
- Department for Education
- Education in England
- Pupil premium
