= Sutton Trust =

Educational charity in the UK

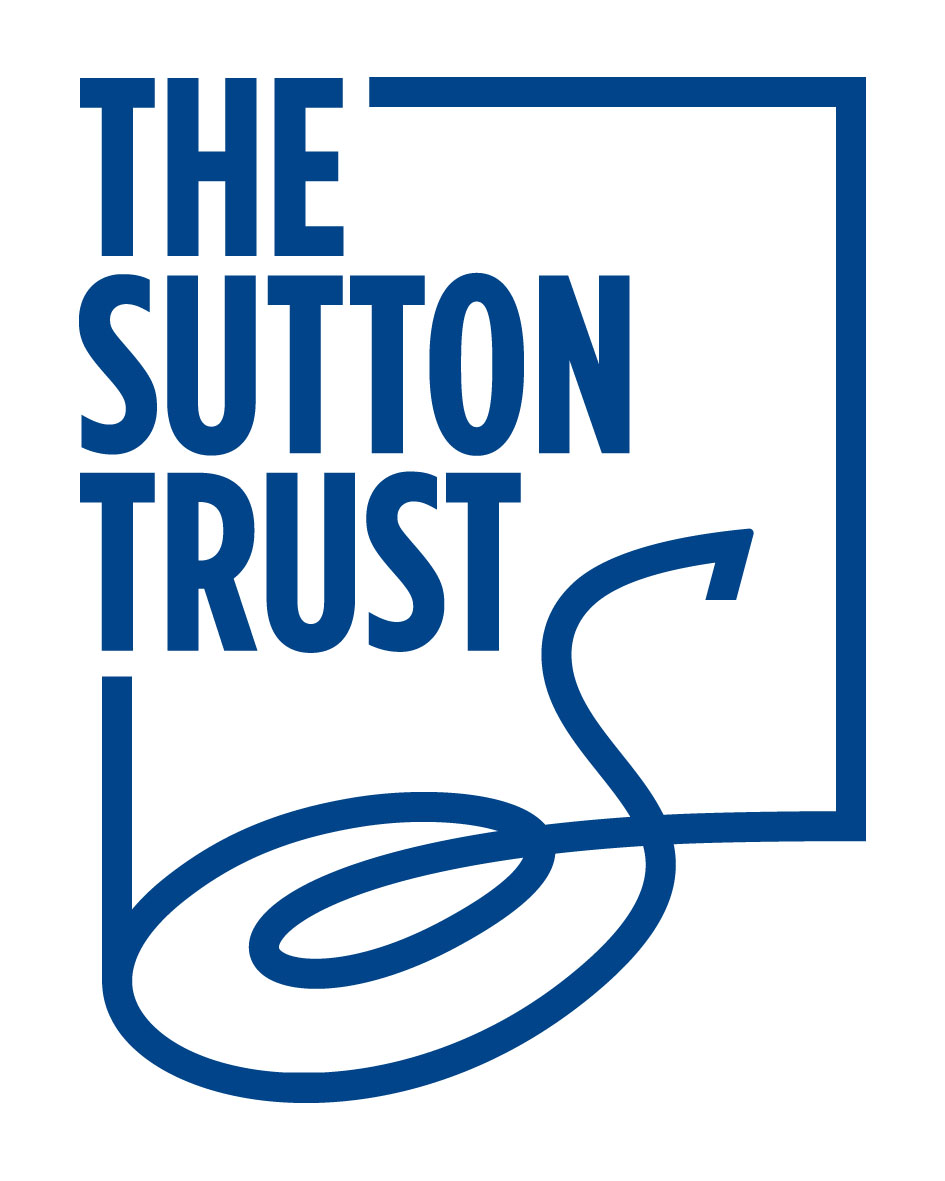
Sutton Trust logo

The Sutton Trust is an educational charity in the United Kingdom which aims to improve social mobility and address educational disadvantage. The charity was set up by educational philanthropist, Sir Peter Lampl in 1997.

Since then, it has undertaken over 150 research studies and funded a wide range of practical programmes for young people in early years, primary and secondary school, with the aim of increasing access to higher education and the professions. The charity's Chief Executive is Nick Harrison.

== Funding ==
Since its founding in 1997, the Trust has received the majority of its funding from its founder and executive chairman, British business executive Sir Peter Lampl. In recent years the trust has diversified its income and now also secures contributions from a range of major corporates, trusts and foundations, university partners, and individual donors. The Sutton Trust is actively fundraising, and has attracted a number of senior figures from banking, industry, trusts and foundations to join its Strategic Advisory and Development Board and its Fellowship.

The trust is investing over £4 million per year in research and programmes designed to improve social mobility. An independent study in 2007 by the Boston Consulting Group found that the trust's investments were cost-effective: on average, programmes generated a return to beneficiaries of £15 for every pound invested.

== Early years programmes ==
In 2014 the Sutton Trust established a £1.25 million fund in partnership with the Esmée Fairbairn Foundation. The fund will support projects aimed at improving parental engagement in the early years.

== School programmes ==
=== Sutton Scholars ===
The trust's Sutton Scholars programme aims to support highly able low- and middle-income students in early secondary school. The programme provides a multi-year course of enrichment activities for each student, with content delivered by four Universities: Cambridge, Nottingham, UCL and Warwick. The programme aims to foster talent at an early age, increasing the pool of students attending the trust's university summer schools.

=== Open Access ===
Open Access is a voluntary scheme proposed by the trust that would open private day schools to students from all backgrounds, with places awarded on merit alone. The schools would remain independent, entrance would be competitive and fees would be paid on a sliding scale. Over 80 independent day schools have backed the scheme, including St Paul's School.

A seven-year pilot at the Belvedere School in Liverpool was funded jointly by the Sutton Trust and the Girls' Day School Trust and all places were awarded on merit, with parents paying a sliding scale of fees according to their means. Under the scheme, the social mix of the school became more diverse with 30% of pupils on free places, 40% paying partial fees and 30% paying full fees. The first cohort achieved the school's best ever examination results – and the best in Liverpool – with 99% of students achieving at least five good GCSEs.

== University programmes ==
=== UK summer schools ===
The Sutton Trust ran its first summer school in 1997 at Oxford University, and they continue to be highly popular. It is the largest programme of its kind, with 10,000 applicants for 2,000 places in 2014. The week long summer schools are designed to give bright students from non-privileged homes an insight into life at a leading university. The programme is delivered by the trust's university partners: Bristol, Cambridge, Durham, Edinburgh, Glasgow, Imperial, King's College London, Nottingham, St Andrews, UCL, and the Royal Veterinary College.

A report published by the trust in 2012, showed that summer school attendees were more likely to get into a highly competitive university than children with similar academic profiles who hadn't attended a summer school. Researchers at the University of Bristol revealed that more than three-quarters (76%) of children who attend a summer school are awarded places at a leading university, compared with just over half (55%) of children with a similar academic and social background who did not apply for a summer school place.

=== US programme ===
The Sutton Trust US programme was launched in 2012 with the UK/US Fulbright Commission. The programme helps low-income students apply to universities and colleges in the US and apply for financial aid packages. The programme, which is free for students, includes a week-long trip to an Ivy League institution, four residential courses in London, intense mentoring throughout the application process, plus payment of examination fees.

The programme took 64 students in its first year in 2012, before expanding to 150 in its second year and 175 in its third year. Students on the 2014 programme attended summer schools at Harvard, Yale, and MIT. In 2014, 61 students from the summer school were awarded places at 37 US institutions to pursue their undergraduate degrees. 60% of these students come from households with an income of less than £25,000 per annum. In its first two years the programme has enabled 82 students to gain scholarships to American universities, including Harvard, Princeton, Yale, MIT and Dartmouth, accessing $20m of financial aid. In its third year, 58 students from the programme were awarded places at 39 different institutions, accessing over $14m in financial aid.

=== Teacher summer school ===
The Sutton Trust runs the country's largest programme of subject specific teacher summer schools aimed at boosting access to the country's leading universities. The teacher summer schools are free to attend and are aimed at teachers in schools and colleges which have relatively few students accessing highly selective universities and which serve areas of socio-economic need.

=== Academic apprenticeship ===
This project aims to increase the number of offers made to non-privileged students by elite universities through an e-mentoring programme. Each student is assigned an e-mentor who assists them through a subject specific pathway.

=== Oxford Pathways ===
This programme offers sustained support to students in years 10–13 to help them make strong applications to Oxford University. The programme provides information, advice and guidance to academically able students and staff members, in non-selective state schools with little history of progression to Oxford. In its first year the programme worked with nearly 3,000 students and 400 teachers from across the UK.

=== University access scheme ===
The university access scheme is run by the Kent Academies Network, in partnership with the Sutton Trust and Fitzwilliam College, University of Cambridge. Participating schools identify students in Year 9 based on their academic potential to begin a four-year programme of support. In each of the four years of the programme, the group of students spend one week at Easter and one week in the summer on a residential course in Kent.

== Professions ==
The Sutton Trust is developing a comprehensive programmes model to enable young people from non-privileged backgrounds to enter the professions – including Law, Medicine, Banking, Insurance, accounting and consulting. The programme will support pupils from Key Stage 4 through to their undergraduate years. The trust's current Pathways programmes are listed below:

=== Pathways to Law ===
Pathways to Law is a programme developed by the Sutton Trust and the College of Law (now the Legal Education Foundation), to widen access to the legal profession. It was established in 2006 and is delivered by twelve universities, in collaboration with ten partnering organisations from the legal profession. The Pathways programme provides various interventions over two years: university-based sessions, including academic lectures and seminar discussions; careers and university advice; e-mentoring by current law students; a guaranteed work placement with a leading law firm; a three-night residential conference; and the use of a library of law-related information and news.

=== Pathways Plus ===
This programme extends the support provided by Pathways to Law. Undergraduates studying law receive academic and careers support both in person and online, in partnership with leading law firms.

=== Pathways to Medicine ===
This programme is delivered in partnership with Imperial College London. Launched in 2014, Pathways to Medicine provides support for aspiring medics from non-privileged backgrounds, starting in year 11 and running throughout the two sixth form years. The programme provides students with a work placement, a mentor in the profession, soft skills sessions and academic activities.

=== Pathways to Property ===
Established in 2012, Pathways to property is open to Year 12 students from UK state schools who are interested in finding out about careers in the property sector. The programme offers a range of activities including a Summer School at the University of Reading in July, a mentoring programme and work experience.

== Research ==
The Sutton Trust produces research on education and social mobility that spans the early years, school, universities and access to the professions.

=== Social mobility ===
A 2005 report commissioned by the Sutton Trust revealed that the UK, alongside the United States, has the lowest level of social mobility of any developed country for which there is data. Researchers from the London School of Economics found that one reason for this trend was that the expansion of higher education in the UK disproportionately benefited those from better-off backgrounds. A follow-up report by the LSE group in 2008 concluded that social mobility had levelled off, with children born in 2000 facing the same mobility prospects as those children born 30 years earlier.

==== Sutton Trust 13 ====
In 2000, the Sutton Trust created a list of 13 UK universities which are research-intensive and ranked highest based on the average rankings of surveys by The Daily Telegraph, The Times, the Financial Times and The Sunday Times (i.e. a combination of UK domestic rankings). The universities are regarded as the UK's "most prestigious", "elite" and "most selective" universities offering around 30,000 places annually. The 13 universities are used as a benchmark for monitoring social mobility by academics, educational organisations and the government. Graduates from the 13 universities are expected to "earn on average £4,300 per year (17%) more than graduates from post-1992 universities, and are 12 percentage points more likely to be in professional employment" 5 years after graduation. The universities are listed below in alphabetical order:

University of Birmingham, University of Bristol, University of Cambridge, Durham University, University of Edinburgh, Imperial College London, London School of Economics, University of Nottingham, University of Oxford, University of St Andrews, University College London, University of Warwick, University of York.

| University | Offer Rate (%)^{a} | Average Entry Tariff^{b} | ARWU 2025 (Global) | QS 2026 (Global) | THE 2026 (Global) | Complete University Guide 2026 (National) | The Guardian 2026 (National) | The Times/ The Sunday Times 2026 (National) |
|---|---|---|---|---|---|---|---|---|
| University of Birmingham | 61.3 | 158 (26) | 151–200 | 76 | =98 | 14 | 28 | 16 |
| University of Bristol | 52.2 | 174 (17) | 98 | 51 | =80 | 15 | 15 | 10 |
| University of Cambridge | 21.8 | 209 (3) | 4 | 6 | =3 | 1 | 3 | =4 |
| Durham University | 48.0 | 185 (10) | 201-300 | =94 | 175 | 5 | 5 | 3 |
| University of Edinburgh | 29.7 | 197 (7) | 37 | 34 | =29 | 18 | 13 | 25 |
| Imperial College London | 30.1 | 206 (5) | 26 | 2 | 8 | 6 | 6 | 6 |
| London School of Economics | 26.1 | 195 (8) | 151–200 | 56 | 52 | 3 | 4 | 1 |
| University of Nottingham | 67.7 | 154 (32) | 101–150 | 97 | =145 | =26 | 51 | 30 |
| University of Oxford | 19.2 | 205 (6) | 6 | 4 | 1 | 2 | 1 | =4 |
| University of St Andrews | 24.7 | 212 (1) | 301–400 | 113 | =162 | 4 | 2 | 2 |
| UCL (University College London) | 29.5 | 190 (9) | 14 | 9 | 22 | 13 | 10 | 9 |
| University of Warwick | 62.0 | 173 (18) | 101–150 | 74 | =122 | 9 | 7 | 8 |
| University of York | 78.7 | 157 (27) | 201-300 | 169 | =154 | 12 | 38 | 20 |

Notes:

^{a} The average offer rate for June deadline undergraduate applicants (all ages) in 2022.
^{b} The average UCAS Tariff achieved by new undergraduate students entering the university in 2021–22. This is based on qualifications achieved, for example A-levels: A* = 56, A = 48, B = 40 UCAS points; Scottish Highers: A = 33, B = 27 UCAS point etc.

==== Sutton Trust 30 ====
In 2011, the trust updated its methodology to include the 30 "most highly selective" British universities, which were "also the 30 most selective according to the Times University Guide" for the purpose of illustrating the relative number of students from poor backgrounds enrolled here against the rest of the institutions. These are, in alphabetical order:

University of Bath, University of Birmingham, University of Bristol, University of Cambridge, Cardiff University, Durham University, University of Edinburgh, University of Exeter, University of Glasgow, Imperial College, King's College London, University of Lancaster, University of Leeds, University of Leicester, University of Liverpool, London School of Economics, University of Manchester, Newcastle University, University of Nottingham, University of Oxford, University of Reading, Royal Holloway, University of London, University of Sheffield, University of Southampton, University of St Andrews, University of Strathclyde, University of Surrey, University College London, University of Warwick and University of York.

=== Teaching and learning toolkit ===
In 2011 the trust developed a teaching and learning toolkit in collaboration with Durham University, which guides teachers and schools in how best to use Pupil Premium funding to improve the attainment of disadvantaged pupils. The toolkit is now managed in conjunction with the Education Endowment Foundation.

=== Access to university ===
In 2014, the trust published a report highlighting the high proportion of Oxford and Cambridge undergraduates who come from a small cadre of elite 'feeder' [mostly fee-paying] schools. Three private schools and two elite colleges sent more students to Oxbridge over three years than 1,800 schools and colleges across the UK. This updated earlier research from 2011.

A report for the trust in 2015 by Oxford University researchers, Subject to Background, showed that disadvantaged pupils were only half as likely as other students to get the A-levels needed to go to elite universities. Drawing on the Effective Pre-School, Primary and Secondary Education longitudinal study of 3,000 children, it cited good pre-schools and schools, regular homework and enrichment activities outside the school curriculum as factors influencing later student choices.

=== Tuition fees ===
In 2014 the Sutton Trust published a report by the Institute for Fiscal Studies investigating the impact of tuition fee reforms. It found that students will leave university with higher debts than before, averaging more than £44,000.

=== Apprenticeships ===
A report published by the trust in 2013 compared apprenticeships across several countries, showing that young people in England had access to poorer quality opportunities than their counterparts in countries like Germany and Switzerland. The report was followed by a summit in 2014.

=== Educational backgrounds ===
In 2012, the trust published Leading People, a report showing that 44% of those at the top of their professions attended fee-paying schools and Oxbridge. This was based on analysis of those featured in national newspaper birthday lists.

The study found that over 35% of MPs, 51% of medics, 54% of leading journalists, 51% of senior bankers and 70% of high court judges attended private schools.

=== Grammar schools ===
A report published by the trust in 2013 investigated the socio-economic backgrounds of grammar school entrants. The report revealed that 2.7% of entrants to grammar schools are entitled to free school meals, whereas 12.7% of entrants come from outside the state sector, largely from independent schools.

=== Postgraduate students ===
A report published by the trust in 2013 showed that 11% of those aged 25–60 in the labour force now hold a postgraduate degree, compared with 4% in 1996. The LSE report estimated the postgraduate earnings premium to be £200,000 greater than for first degree holders. The research was cited in the Chancellor of the Exchequer's 2014 Autumn Statement as a rationale for the introduction of postgraduate loans.

=== Academies ===
The trust published the first index of the performance of academy chains in 2014. The analysis, Chain Effects, showed significant differences in the performance of different academy chains. The Department for Education decided to publish such data in 2015, a recommendation of the report.

=== Teaching ===
The trust's 2014 literature review What Makes Great Teaching, by Dr Rob Coe of Durham University, highlighted the dos and don'ts of effective pedagogy.

=== Early years ===
The trust published a literature review Baby Bonds in 2014 by researchers from Columbia and Princeton universities highlighting the importance of secure attachment for babies.

Another 2014 report, Sound Foundations, by Oxford University academics showed the importance of qualified early years staff working with disadvantaged young children.

== Education Endowment Foundation ==
In 2011 the Sutton Trust was awarded a £135 million arm's length grant by the Government to establish a new initiative to boost the attainment of disadvantaged children. This fund was used to launch the Education Endowment Foundation (EEF), which initiates grants and seeks proposals from schools, teachers, local authorities and charities to improve attainment in schools.

== Past programmes ==
=== PEEP Transition Project ===
The pilot project aims to help prepare parents, carers and children for the transition from home to pre-school, particularly targeting those who lack confidence and understanding of how they can help with their children's learning, feel alienated from the education system and experience social isolation and/or speak English as an additional language.

Through various sessions, including a home visit, group sessions to the pre-school setting, and a settling-in session on the child's first day, it is hoped that not only will the children feel more supported, but the confidence and ability of parents to help and value their child's learning and development will be improved.

=== Room to Play ===
Designed to provide support to hard-to-reach families, through drop-in style provision based in a shopping centre in one of the most deprived parts of Oxford. The service provides activities for children, and teaches parents how to facilitate their child's learning through everyday play and interactions.

=== One-to-one Tuition Pilot ===
In 2011 the Sutton Trust, with support from Greater London Tutors, piloted a project that offered private tuition in mathematics to 100-150 academically able Year 11 pupils from non-privileged homes who would not otherwise be able to afford it. The programme supported pupils with the potential to achieve A or A* grades in their maths GCSE who were at risk of not doing so, and provided 10 hours of private tuition either one-to-one or in pairs in the run-up to the GCSE exam.

=== Future First ===
Future First works to introduce alumni networks to state schools by bringing back former students to inspire, advise and guide current pupils. The programme aims to help students define their career goals and educational aspirations, as well as offering practical help, including putting together effective CVs. The scheme allows face-to-face alumni contact and the development of individual interactive alumni websites for each schools. The programme also offers work placements through its network, including work-shadowing opportunities with leading barristers.

=== Reach for Excellence ===
The Reach for Excellence programme has been running at the University of Leeds for a number of years and is funded by Lloyds TSB in partnership with the Sutton Trust. The programme aims to raise the aspirations of non-privileged young people who have the potential to attend research-led universities. The students are from schools and colleges with low higher-education participation rates in the area around the university.

As part of the programme, each student receives a package of guidance throughout their A-Levels including subject taster sessions, skills workshops, financial advice, e-mentoring and a residential summer school.

=== The Subject Matters ===
A number of the Sutton Trust's research studies have pointed to the importance of students making well-informed choices at A-Level. The trust has funded the university's The Subject Matters sessions for Year 11 students and teachers in target schools, which are designed to support and inform the decision making process.

== See also ==
- Widening participation
- List of think tanks in the United Kingdom
