= Emil Probst =

Engineer and academic (1877–1950)

Emil Heinrich Israel Probst
- Born: 10 October 1877; Dobromyl, Austrian Galicia
- Died: 27 January 1950 (aged 72); Willesden, London
- Citizenship: Austrian until 1912; Prussian until 1918; German until 1942; British from 1948
- Occupations: Engineer and professor
- Known for: Contributions to the development of reinforced concrete
- Notable work: Civil Engineer's Reference Book (1951)

Emil Heinrich Israel Probst (10 October 1877 – 27 January 1950) was an engineer and professor based in Germany, who made a significant contribution to the development of reinforced concrete. He was a Christian, however he had Jewish heritage and fled to Britain to escape the Nazi régime.

== Early life ==
Emil Probst was born on 10 October 1877 in Dobromyl, then part of Austrian Galicia, and now Ukraine. He had Jewish parents who both died while Probst was a young child. His father was a merchant. He grew up with his aunts in Vienna and, much to the dismay of his relatives, converted to the Lutheran church on 10 October 1900, his 23rd birthday. He attended a Realgymnasium (grammar school) in Vienna until his graduation in 1895 and initially studied medicine at the University of Vienna. From 1896, he studied engineering at the Vienna University of Technology, graduating in 1903. His initial course was in mechanical engineering, then he took up structural engineering from 1898.

== Interest in reinforced concrete ==
He completed his military service as a one-year volunteer in 1899-1900. After graduating, he studied reinforced concrete construction in Paris. He worked as an engineer in the USA in 1904, where he visited the St. Louis World's Fair. In 1905-1906, he was an assistant to Franz Schüle at ETH Zurich. Schüle was a leading figure in the development of reinforced concrete and had at his disposal one of Europe's best equipped laboratories. Probst published his first paper in 1906, 'Das Zusammenwirken von Beton und Eisen' (the bond between concrete and iron), and in it referred to his research in the Zurich laboratory.

From 1906 Probst worked as a civil engineer in Berlin. In 1908, he received his doctorate from the Berlin-Charlottenburg University of Technology with a dissertation on the influence of reinforcement and cracks in concrete on structural safety (A Critique of Existing Regulations for Reinforced Concrete Structures). He subsequently qualified as a university lecturer at the Technical University of Berlin-Charlottenburg and became a private lecturer. He became a Prussian citizen in 1912. During the First World War, from 1914 to 1918, he served in the Prussian Landwehrpionieren (pioneer reserve infantry), building fortifications on the Eastern Front and Belgian coastline.

== Appointment as professor ==
In 1915, Probst was appointed full professor of reinforced concrete construction at the Karlsruhe Institute of Technology, but was unable to take up the position until 1918 due to the requirement to complete his military service. Soon after, in 1919, he established the structural engineering testing institute in Karlsruhe, which undertook research for government and industry, particularly in respect of road construction and the use of reinforced concrete. He served as rector in 1926–1927. Probst advocated curriculum reform, arguing against subject-specific specialism: Probst emphasised the need for a broad, interdisciplinary education. For many years he was the liaison between the professors and the student union. In 1933, he was expelled from his position by the National Socialists, despite lobbying from his colleagues. The exemption for Jewish veterans serving in the First World War was not recognized in his case, because he worked in fortress construction rather than on active service.

== Escape to Britain ==
Probst emigrated to Britain at some point before October 1939, when he was recorded in the national census as living in Oxford. There he received support from British colleagues such as Sir Reginald Stradling, became a lecturer at the University of Bristol from 1943 to 1945, and subsequently worked as an independent engineer and research associate in the research department of the British Ministry of Works. In 1947, he was formally reinstated to his professorship in Karlsruhe and simultaneously granted emeritus status. He became a British citizen in 1948, along with his youngest daughter.

== Research activities ==
Probst's first major work was the 1917 publication of the first of what became two substantial volumes, both over 500 pages long, entitled Vorlesungen über Eisenbeton (Lectures on reinforced concrete), based on his academic teachings.

The 1920s were Probst’s most productive and significant period of his research into concrete. Later, in 1931, he said his main research focus areas were the impact of alternating loading on concrete and reinforced concrete, and research into the corrosion of reinforced concrete by sulphates, alkalis and acids.

In the 1920s and 1930s, he was a pioneer in strain measurements on concrete structures, including for domes and dams. Since mathematical models and calculation methods were limited at that time, he preferred measurements directly on the structure. He researched the watertightness of concrete, its use in road construction, and the structural behaviour of concrete. In 1935, after he had been forced out of his academic role, he published his book Principles of plain and reinforced concrete construction, which was translated into English in 1936.

International recognition soon followed. He represented the Verein Deutscher Ingenieure (VDI) (Association of German Engineers) on trips to China, Japan, Sweden, Russia, and the USA. He was one of the founders of the civil engineering journal Bauingenieur, which he edited from 1920 until he relinquished the role in 1934. In October 1931 he came to London to give a lecture to the Institution of Structural Engineers, with the title of 'The influence of rapidly alternating loading on concrete and reinforced concrete'. This attracted the interest of Stradling, director of the Building Research Station, who in comments after the lecture described it as the first time that proof had been given of a critical range for fatigue in concrete structures.

During the Second World War Probst wrote articles for British technical engineering publications, and he attended meetings of the Institution of Civil Engineers in London.

After the war, one notable task Probst undertook in 1946 involved a return to Germany. He accompanied his Ministry of Works colleague, structural engineer Francis Walley, to investigate the use of prestressed concrete that had been used in Germany and other European countries during the Second World War. This encouraged Walley, who was previously unaware of the process, to promote the use of prestressed concrete as part of the post-war rebuilding of Britain, which had a considerable impact on the urban landscape.

His final significant publication was the first edition of the Civil Engineering Reference Book, which he started writing in 1947. He died before the book was published in 1951, and his assistant James Comrie completed the work. In an introduction, Comrie said of Probst that the book had been "one of his ruling interests of his last years and he refused to spare himself in any way up to his untimely death in January 1950.". Renamed as the Civil Engineer's Reference Book, the last (fourth) edition came out in 1989.

== Personal life and death ==
In 1914 Probst married Elisabeth Leitholf (1892–1974), with whom he had four children, 3 daughters and one son. He died on 27 January 1950 at Willesden General Hospital, Willesden, London.

== Recognition ==
In 1918 Probst's service in the First World War were recognised with the award of the Iron Cross, second class.

In 1928, he received the bronze medal from the Institution of Structural Engineers in London, and, in 1929, he was elected as a foreign honorary member of the American Academy of Arts and Sciences in Boston.
