= List of former Aesculapian Club members =

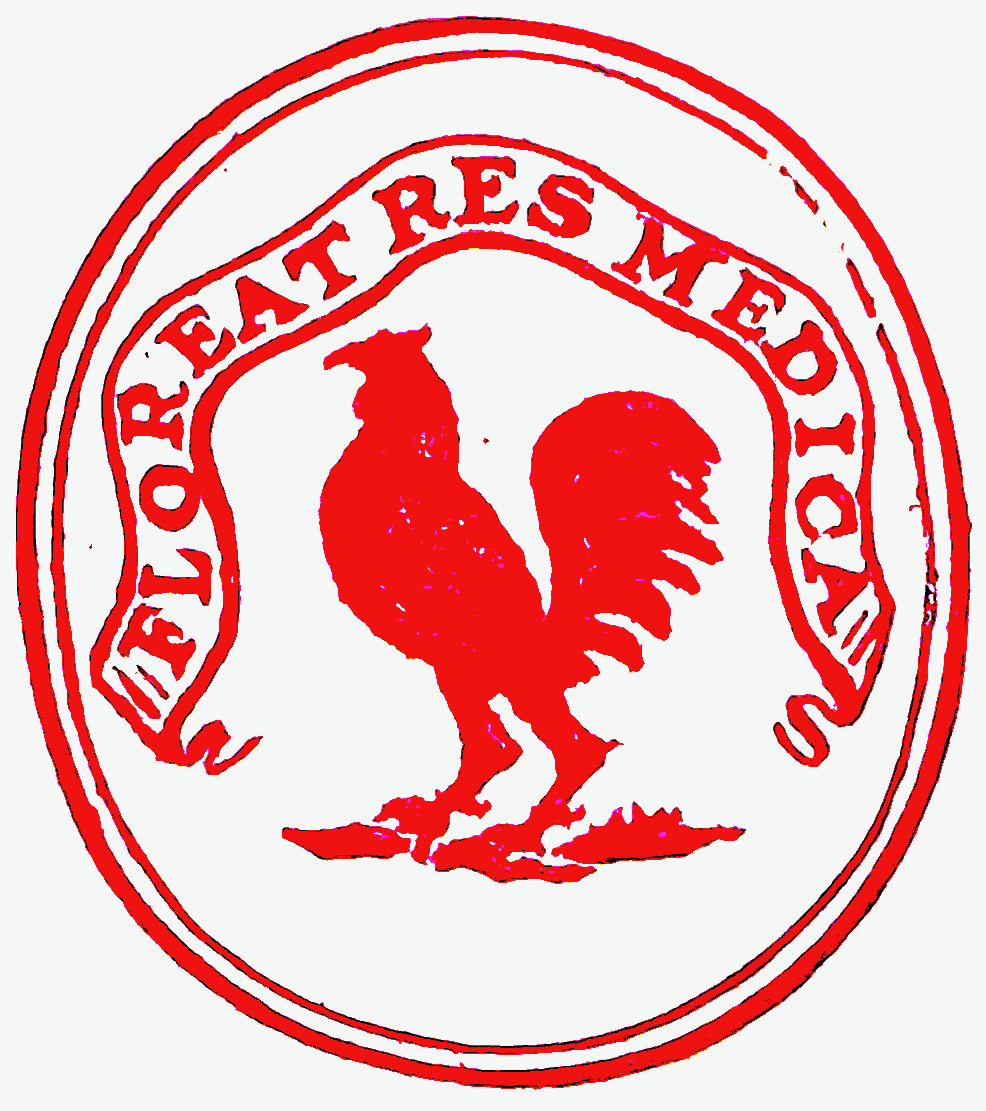
Aesculapian Club badge

The Aesculapian Club has had many notable former members. The following sections give a list of former members of the Club in chronological order of their year of election.

== 1770s ==
List of Members elected in the 1770s.
Number	Name	Year of Election	Year of Resignation/Death
1	Andrew Duncan 'The Elder'	1773	Died 1828
2	William Chalmer	1773	Died 1784
3	Andrew Wood	1773	Resigned 1803; Died 1821
4	James Lind	1773	Resigned 1774; Died 1812
5	James Hamilton "Senior"	1773	Resigned 1798; Died 1835
6	Benjamin Bell	1773	Resigned 1798; Died 1806
7	Thomas Hay	1773	Resigned 1803–11; Died 1816/17
8	Forrest Dewar	1773	Resigned 1803–11; Died 1817
9	Hamilton McLure	1773	Died 1789
10	Colin Lauder	1773	Resigned 1792; Died 1831
11	John Balfour	1773	Died 1779
12	Nathaniel Spens	1773	Resigned 1789; Died 1815
13	Alexander Wood	1773	Died 1807
14	Alexander Hamilton	1773	Resigned 1788; Died 1802
15	James Hay	1774	Resigned 1784; Died 1810
16	John Hope	1774	Resigned 1784; Died 1786
17	Thomas Wood	1777	Resigned 1784
18	Robert Langlands	1779	Died 1792

There are two individuals called James Lind who were Fellows of the Royal College of Physicians of Edinburgh at this time. The older James Lind was born in 1716 and is most famous for conducting research into the cause and treatment of scurvy. His younger cousin James Lind was born in 1736 and was a physician with interests in natural sciences and botany. He was a similar age to the other founding members making it more likely that he was the Aesculapian. Aesculapian Lind resigned membership of the club after only 11 months in March 1774. In 1774, the younger James Lind is known to have failed to secure a professorship in Edinburgh. Andrew Duncan 'The Elder' and Daniel Rutherford were also applicants.

== 1780s ==
List of members elected in the 1780s
Number	Name	Year of Election	Year of Resignation/Death
19	Daniel Rutherford	1784	Died 1819
20	William Inglis	1784	Resigned 1790; Died 1792
21	Alexander Monro Secundus	1784	Resigned 1790; Died 1817
22	Thomas Cochrane	1788	Resigned 1793
23	Charles Congalton	1789	Resigned 1794
24	Thomas Spens	1789	Resigned 1803; Died 1842

== 1790s ==
List of Members elected in the 1790s
Number	Name	Year of Election	Year of Resignation/Death
25	Andrew Wardrop	1790	Resigned 1798; Died 1823
26	Andrew Inglis	1790	Resigned 1798; Died 1834
27	James Home	1792	Resigned 1826; Died 1844
28	Colin Drummond	1793	Resigned 1795
29	John Walker	1794	Resigned 1819; Died 1841
30	James Clark	1794	Resigned 1798
31	Thomas Wood	1796	Resigned 1803–11; Died 1821
32	George Wood	1796	Resigned 1833
33	James Russell	1796	Resigned 1789; Died 1836
34	Henry Johnston	1796	Resigned 1799
35	William Harkness	1796	Resigned 1797
36	William Greenfield	1796	Resigned 1797; Died 1827
37	James Anderson	1798	Resigned 1800; Died 1817
38	William Brown	1799	Resigned 1801; Died 1818
39	James Buchan	1799	Resigned 1832

There is no record of a William Harkness being a Fellow of the Royal College of Surgeons of Edinburgh, but a Walter Harkness became a Fellow in 1792.

There is no record that William Greenfield was a Fellow of either the Royal College of Surgeons of Edinburgh or the Royal College of Physicians of Edinburgh. He was elected a member of the Harveian Society of Edinburgh in 1793 and it was a custom of that Society that non-medical guests who joined in heartily with the proceedings could be invited on multiple occasions and became honorary members by acclamation.

It appears that Thomas Wood was re-elected to the Club in 1796 having resigned membership in 1784.

== 1800s ==
List of members elected in the 1800s
Number	Name	Year of Election	Year of Resignation/Death
40	William Farquharson	1801	Resigned 1819; Died 1823
41	James Bryce	1801	Died 1826
42	John Herdman	1801	Resigned 1803–11; Died 1842
43	Alexander Gillespie	1803	Resigned 1859; Died 1859
44	Thomas Charles Hope	1805	Resigned 1817; Died 1844
45	Andrew Duncan 'The Younger'	1805	Died 1832
46	George Kellie	1805	Resigned 1805–11; Died 1829
47	Charles Anderson	1805	Resigned 1805-11
48	James Wardrop	1805	Resigned 1805-11
49	Alexander Wylie	1809	1817

== 1810s ==
List of members elected in the 1810s
Number	Name	Year of Election	Year of Resignation/Death
50	James Hamilton 'The Younger'	1810	1824; Died 1839
51	John Barclay	1810	Died 1826
52	John Allan (Note: There is no record of Allan being a Fellow of the Royal College of Surgeons of Edinburgh. He became a Member of the Royal College of Surgeons of England in 1811 and became a mate on an 'Indiaman' sailing ship in that same year. Allan and John Barclay were both elected to the Aesculapian Club on 6 May 1810; Allan's publication from 1825 was 'communicated' by Barclay.)	1810	Resigned 1825; Died 1850
53	Henry Dewar	1816	Died 1823

== 1820s ==
List of members elected in the 1820s
Number	Name	Year of Election	Year of Resignation/Death
54	Robert Graham	1820	Resigned 1835; Died 1845
55	John Aitkin	1820	Resigned 1830; Died 1860
56	John Warroch Pursell	1820	Died 1835
57	William Wood	1820	Resigned 1831; Died 1858
58	George Ballingall	1821	Resigned 1841; Died 1855
59	George Augustus Borthwick	1821	Resigned 1839; Died 1844
60	Robert Hamilton	1821	Resigned 1853; Died 1868
61	William Alison	1821	Resigned 1840; Died 1859
62	James Millar (or Miller)	1822	Died 1827
63	Richard Huie	1823	Resigned 1843; Died 1867
64	Henry Cullen	1824	Died 1828
65	William Howison	1825	Resigned 1832
66	John Thatcher	1826	Died 1853
67	John MacWhirter	1826	Resigned 1853; Died 1854
68	William Moncrieff (Note: Moncrieff was appointed physician to the New Town Dispensary, Edinburgh on 1 December 1817 and physician to the Royal Public Dispensary in January 1822. On 12 December 1823 he applied for the vacant position of physician to the Royal Infirmary of Edinburgh. In 1827, Moncrieff was Librarian of the Royal College of Physicians of Edinburgh.)	1826	Died 1836
69	John Argyll Robertson	1827	Resigned 1845; Died 1855
69	John Campbell	1828	Resigned 1838; Died 1867
70	David Maclagan	1828	Resigned 1865; Died 1865
71	Richard Poole	1829	Resigned 1833; Died 1871

== 1830s ==
List of members elected in the 1830s
Number	Name	Year of Election	Year of Resignation/Death
73	Robert Lewins	1830	Resigned 1843
74	William Beilby	1831	Resigned 1841; Died 1849
75	George Hamilton Bell	1832	Resigned 1841; Died 1862
76	Samuel Alexander Pagan	1832	Resigned 1863; Died 1867
77	John Home Peebles	1833	Resigned 1840
78	Thomas Stewart Traill	1833	Resigned 1837; Died 1862
79	William Newbigging	1833	Resigned 1839; Died 1852
80	Alexander Macaulay	1834	Resigned 1844; Died 1868
81	William Gregory	1834	Resigned 1837; Died 1858
82	Robert Nasmyth	1835	Resigned 1860; Died 1870
83	Charles Anderson	1836	Resigned 1846; Died 1855
84	David Hay	1836	Resigned 1841; Died 1843/4
85	Peter David Handyside	1837	Resigned 1849; Died 1881
86	John C Douglas Smith Snr	1838	Died 1879
87	Charles Ransford	1839	Resigned 1848; Died 1886
88	James Simson	1839	Died 1876

== 1840s ==
List of members elected in the 1840s
Number	Name	Year of Election	Year of Resignation/Death
89	Robert Omond	1840	Resigned 1878; Died 1881
90	William Seller	1841	Died 1869
91	Robert Bowes Malcolm	1841	Resigned 1878; Died 1894
92	James Scarth Combe	1843	Resigned 1876; Died 1883
93	Charles Bell	1843	Resigned 1860; Died 1891
94	James Miller	1843	Died 1864
95	Andrew Douglas Maclagan	1843	Died 1900
96	William Henderson	1843	Resigned 1845; Died 1872
97	John Graham MacDonald Burt	1843	Died 1868
98	Andrew Fyfe	1844	Resigned 1844; Died 1861
99	George Andrew Paterson	1845	Resigned 1850, but remained an 'Emeritus Aesculapian'; Died 1893
100	John Coldstream	1845	Resigned 1860; Died 1863
101	Patrick Newbigging	1845	Died 1864
102	John Hutton Balfour	1846	Resigned 1883; Died 1884
103	James Begbie	1848	Resigned 1857; Died 1869
104	James Syme	1849	Resigned 1857; Died 1870

The Aesculapian Club photograph album entry for Charles Bell erroneously includes a copy of the portrait of Charles Bell, whose name is given to unilateral paralysis of the facial nerve (Bell's palsy). Bell died in 1842 and was not a member of the Aesculapian Club. Aesculapian Charles Bell was the nephew of Sir Charles and the younger brother of Aesculapian George Hamilton Bell.

== 1850s ==
List of members elected in the 1850s
Number	Name	Year of Election	Year of Resignation/Death
105	James Young Simpson	1850	Died 1870
106	William Brown	1852	Resigned 1871; Died 1873
107	John Taylor	1854	Died 1856
108	Benjamin Bell	1854	Died 1883
109	Andrew Wood	1857	Died 1881
110	James Dunsmure	1857	Resigned 1886; Died 1886
111	James Donaldson Gillespie	1858	Died 1891

== 1860s ==
List of members elected in the 1860s
Number	Name	Year of Election	Year of Resignation/Death
112	Patrick Heron Watson	1860	Died 1908
113	William Henry Lowe	1860	Resigned 1875; Died 1900
114	Thomas Graham Weir	1861	Resigned 1894; Died 1896
115	Daniel Rutherford Haldane	1864	Died 1887
116	William Rutherford Sanders	1865	Died 1881
117	William Turner	1868	Died 1916

== 1870s ==
List of members elected in the 1870s
Number	Name	Year of Election	Year of Resignation/Death
118	John Duncan	1870	Died 1899
119	James Matthews Duncan	1870	Resigned 1877; Died 1890
120	James Warburton Begbie	1870	Died 1876
121	Joseph Lister	1872	Resigned 1877; Died 1912
122	John Smith Jr.	1876	Resigned 1910; Died 1910
123	Robert Paterson	1876	Resigned 1881; Died 1889
124	Joseph Bell	1876	Resigned 1910; Died 1911
125	Claud Muirhead	1876	Died 1910
126	Douglas Argyll Robertson	1878	Resigned 1904; Died 1909
127	John Wyllie	1878	Died 1916
128	William Rutherford	1878	Died 1899
129	Robert James Blair Cunynghame	1879	Died 1903
130	Thomas Richard Fraser	1879	Resigned 1919; Died 1920

== 1880s ==
List of members elected in 1880s
Number	Name	Year of Election	Year of Resignation/Death
131	Francis Brodie Imlach	1881	Died 1891
132	Thomas Smith Clouston	1881	Died 1915
133	Charles Edward Underhill	1881	Died 1908
134	George William Balfour	1883	Died 1903
135	Alexander Crum Brown	1883	Resigned 1919; Died 1922
136	Thomas Annandale	1886	Died 1907
137	Robert Peel Ritchie	1887	Died 1902

== 1890s ==
List of members elected in the 1890s
Number	Name	Year of Election	Year of Resignation/Death
138	John Chiene	1892	Resigned 1919; Died 1923
139	James Dunsmure	1892	Died 1907
140	John Sibbald	1893	Resigned 1905; Died 1905
141	Francis Cadell	1895	Resigned 1906; Died 1909
142	James Andrew	1899	Died 1911
143	John Halliday Croom	1899	Resigned 1921; Died 1923

In March 1895 Alexander Peddie was elected a member of the club. His photograph was added to the club's album and his name was included in printed list of members for that year. However, he did not attend any dinners and the minutes from October 1895 record that after due consideration Peddie had declined to become a member. In December 1895, Francis Cadell was elected in his place. Cadell was a surgeon and father of the Scottish colourist Francis Cadell.

== 1900s ==
List of members elected in the 1900s
Number	Name	Year of Election	Year of Resignation/Death
144	Sir William Tennant Gairdner	1900	Resigned 1902; Died 1907
145	Sir John Batty Tuke	1902	Died 1913
146	Sir William Allan Jamieson	1903	Died 1916
147	Dr. Alexander James	1903	Died 1932
148	Professor Daniel John Cunningham	1904	Died 1909
149	Sir George Andreas Berry	1904	Resigned 1932; Died 1940
150	Dr. John Playfair	1905	Died 1933
151	Dr. Charles Watson MacGillivray	1907	Resigned 1928; Died 1932
152	Sir Joseph Montagu Cotterill	1907	Resigned 1932; Died 1933
153	Lieutenant-Colonel Russell Elliot Wood	1908	Died 1917
154	Sir Harold Jalland Stiles	1908	Resigned 1937; Died 1946
155	Sir Byrom Bramwell	1908	Resigned 1927; Died 1931

== 1910s ==
List of members elected in 1910s
Number	Name	Year of Election	Year of Resignation/Death
156	Mr. Francis Mitchell Caird	1910	Died 1926
157	Henry Alexis Thomson	1910	Died 1924
158	Dr. George Alexander Gibson	1910	Died 1913
159	Sir David Wallace	1911	Resigned 1946; Died 1952
160	Professor William Russell	1911	Resigned 1926; Died 1940
161	Dr. George Henry 'Harry' Melville Dunlop	1913	Died 1916
162	Sir John Macpherson	1914	Resigned 1922
163	Dr. Alexander Blackhall-Morison	1919	Died 1927

== 1920s ==
List of members elected in 1910s
Number	Name	Year of Election	Year of Resignation/Death
164	Sir Robert William Philip	1920	Died 1939
165	Dr. John James Graham Brown	1920	Died 1925
166	Sir James William Beeman Hodsdon	1920	Died 1928
167	Dr. Henry Harvey Littlejohn	1920	Died 1927
168	Dr. Diarmid Noel Paton	1921	Died 1925
169	Dr. George Matthew Robertson	1921	Died 1932
170	Dr. James Haig Ferguson	1921	Died 1934
171	Francis Darby Boyd	1921	Died 1922
172	John Wheeler Dowden	1921	Died 1936
173	Dr. William Fordyce	1921	Died 1941
174	Dr. George Lovell Gulland	1921	Died 1941
175	Dr. Arthur Logan Turner	1924	Died 1939
176	Alexander Miles	1924	Resigned 1937; Died 1953
177	Dr. Robert Alexander Fleming	1925	Died 1947
178	Dr. Robert Thin	1927	Died 1941
179	Dr. Arthur Henry Havens Sinclair	1927	Resigned 1946; Died 1962
180	Professor Edwin Bramwell	1927	Resigned 1945; Died 1952
181	Dr. Ralph Stockman	1928	Resigned 1945; Died 1946
182	Dr. William Thomas Ritchie	1928	Died 1945
183	Mr. William James Stuart	1928	Died 1958
184	George Lyall Chiene	1929	Resigned 1946; Died 1951

== 1930s ==
List of members elected in the 1930s
Number	Name	Year of Election	Year of Resignation/Death
185	John William Struthers	1932	Resigned 1938; Died 1953
186	Sir Henry Wade	1932	Died 1955
187	Dr. John Dixon Comrie	1932	Died 1939
188	Lt-Col Anderson Gray McKendrick	1933	Died 1943
189	Dr. George Douglas Mathewson	1933	Died 1935
190	Professor Sir David Percival Dalbreck 'DPD' Wilkie	1934	Died 1938
191	Dr. John Orr	1936	Died 1949
192	Dr. Henry 'Harry' Moss Traquair	1936	Resigned 1949; Died 1954
193	Professor Robert William Johnstone	1937	Died 1969
194	Mr. James Methuen Graham	1938	Died 1962
195	Professor Sir John Fraser	1938	Resigned 1946; Died 1947
196	Lt-Col Alexander Dron Stewart	1938	Died 1969
197	Dr. Andrew Fergus Hewat	1939	Died 1957

== 1940s ==
List of members elected in the 1940s
Number	Name	Year of Election	Year of Resignation/Death
198	Professor Charles McNeil	1946	Resigned 1951; Died 1964
199	Dr. William Douglas Denton Small	1946	Died 1964
200	Professor Sir Derrick Melville Dunlop	1946	Died 1980
201	Lt-Col William Frederick Harvey	1946	Died 1948
202	Sir David Kennedy Henderson	1946	Died 1965
203	Francis Evelyn Jardine	1946	Died 1956
204	Professor David Murray Lyon	1946	Died 1956
205	Professor Sir Sydney Alfred Smith	1946	Died 1969
206	Professor Alexander Murray Drennan	1947	Died 1984
207	Professor James Couper Brash	1947	Died 1958
208	Dr. Douglas James Guthrie	1947	Died 1975
209	Dr. William Francis Theodore Haultain	1947	Died 1958
210	Walter Quarry Wood	1947	Died 1958
211	Dr. William Alister Alexander	1948	Died 1976
212	Professor Douglas James Acworth Kerr	1949	Died 1960
213	Professor Sir James Rognvald Learmonth	1949	Died 1967

== 1950s ==
List of members elected in the 1950s
Number	Name	Year of Election	Year of Resignation/Death
214	Professor Sir Leybourne Stanley Davidson	1951	Resigned 1964; Died 1981
215	Dr. James Kirkwood Slater	1952	Died 1965
216	Sir Walter 'Wattie' Mercer	1953	Died 1971
217	Dr. Andrew Rae Gilchrist	1954	Died 1995
218	Professor Sir John Bruce	1955	Died 1975
219	Thomas 'Tommy' McWalter Millar	1956	Resigned 1963; Died 1970
220	Dr. John Alastair Bruce	1958	Died 1971
221	Dr. Clifford Donald Kennedy	1957	Resigned 1988; Died 1989
222	David Skene Middleton	1957	Resigned 1980; Died 1981
223	Professor Sir John Halliday Croom	1958	Resigned 1984; Died 1986
224	Professor Robert J Kellar	1958	Resigned 1979; Died 1981
225	Professor George Lightbody Montgomery	1958	Died 1993
226	Dr. Ranald Malcolm Murray-Lyon	1958	Died 1969
227	James 'Jimmy' Johnston Mason Brown	1959	Died 1964
228	Dr. David Glyn Lamond Lackie	1959	Died 1985

== 1960s ==
List of members elected in the 1960s
Number	Name	Year of Election	Year of Resignation/Death
229	Sir James Davidson Stuart 'JDS' Cameron	1961	Died 1969
230	Professor George John Romanes	1962	Died 2014
231	Mr Thomas 'Tammas' Ian Wilson	1962	Died 1983
232	Professor Sir Ian George Wilson Hill	1963	Died 1982
233	Mr James 'Jim' Sneddon Jeffrey	1964	Died 1989
234	Professor Francis John Gillingham	1965	Died 2010
235	Professor Ronald 'Ronnie' Haxton Girdwood	1965	Died 2006
236	Dr. Neil Macmichael	1965	Resigned 1980; Died 1989
237	Dr. John Duncan 'JDM' Matthews	1969	Died 2009
238	Dr. Ronald 'Ronnie' Foote Robertson	1969	Died 1991

== 1970s ==
List of members elected in the 1970s
Number	Name	Year of Election	Year of Resignation/Death
239	Dr. Robert 'Bobby' M Marquis	1970	Died 1989
240	Professor Michael Oliver	1971	Resigned 1984; Died 2015
241	Mr James Ross	1971	Died 1997
242	Professor Eric Samuel	1972	Resigned 1978; Died 1997
243	Mr Iain MacLaren	1974	Died 2019
244	Dr. Hamish Watson	1976	Died 2001
245	Dr. Michael 'Mike' Matthews	1976	Resigned 1984; Died 2015
246	Mr James 'Jimmy' William Wishart Thomson	1976	Died 1996
247	Mr James 'Jimmy' Scott	1978	Died 2010
248	Professor James 'Jim' Robson	1978	Died 2010
249	Mr John Cook	1979	Resigned 1987; Died 2020
250	Dr. Andrew Doig	1979	Died 2017
251	Mr Peter Edmond	1979	Resigned

James Thomson was appointed a consultant surgeon at the Royal Infirmary of Edinburgh in 1964.

== 1980s ==
List of members elected in the 1980s
Number	Name	Year of Election	Year of Resignation/Death
252	Dr. Tom Philp	1980	Died 1994
253	Dr. William 'Bill' Donald MacLennan	1980	Died 2002
254	Professor Ian Bouchier	1980	Died 2026
255	Professor Sir James Fraser	1982	Died 1997
256	Mr John Chalmers	1982	Resigned 2023
257	Professor Sir Andrew Patrick McEwen Forrest	1983	Died 2021
258	Dr. James Syme	1984	Died June 1999
259	Mr Alasdair Bruce MacGregor	1984	Died 2002
260	Professor Robert 'Bob' Evan Kendell	1984	Resigned 1992; Died 2002
261	Professor Arthur 'ACK' Colville Kennedy	1984	Died 2009
262	Mr Alan Dean	1985	Resigned 2023
263	Dr. Anthony 'Tony' Douglas Toft	1987	Resigned 2021

== 1990s ==
List of members elected in the 1990s
Number	Name	Year of Election	Year of Resignation/Death
265	Professor John Richmond	1990	Died 2008
266	Mr James Christie	1991	Resigned 2023
267	Professor John Cash	1992	Died 2020
269	Professor Robert 'Bertie' Wood	1992	Died 2022
271	Professor Charles Forbes	1993	Resigned 2006; Died 2017
272	Dr. Martin Lees	1993	Died 2015
273	Dr. David Thomson	1994	Resigned
274	Dr. Andrew A. Calder MBE	1996	Resigned
275	Professor John Hunter OBE	1997	Resigned 2026
277	Professor Ray Newton	1999	Died 2022

== 2000s ==
List of members elected in the 2000s
Number	Name	Year of Election	Year of Resignation/Death
279	Professor A Ross Lorimer	2002	Resigned
280	Professor Stuart Macpherson OBE	2003	Resigned 2026
297	Dr. Andrew Flapan	2014	Died 2025
