= List of York Medical Society orators =

This is a list of York Medical Society orators.

- 1890 Sir Jonathan Hutchinson, F.R.S., London
- 1891 Mr. C. G. Wheelhouse, F.R.C.S.
- 1892 Sir T. Clifford Allbutt, K.C.B., F.R.S., Cambridge
- 1893 Sir Victor Horsley, F.R.S., London
- 1894 Sir James Crichton-Browne, F.R.S., London
- 1895 Dr. German Sims Woodhead, F.R.S.E., Cambridge
- 1896 Sir W. F. Mitchell Banks, F.R.C.S., liverpool
- 1897 Sir James F. Goodheart, Bart, London
- 1898 Sir T. Lauder Brunton, Bart, F.R.S., London
- 1899 Dr. H. W. Balfour, F.R.S.E., Edinburgh
- 1900 Professor Alexander Macalister, F.R.S., Cambridge
- 1901 Sir George Savage, London
- 1902 Dr. P. H. Pye-Smith, London
- 1903 Dr. Norman Moore
- 1904 Dr. Newsholme, London
- 1905 Sir William Church, Bart, K.C.B., London
- 1906 Sir William Henry Allchin, F.R.S.E., London
- 1907 Dr. E. Hope, Liverpool
- 1908 Sir Thomas S. Clouston, Edinburgh
- 1909 Sir William Osler, Bart, F.R.S., Oxford
- 1910 Dr. T.D. Acland, London
- 1911 Professor J.W. Smith, Manchester
- 1912 Dr. S. Monkton, Copeman, London
- 1913 Mr. Stephen Paget, F.R.C.S., London
- 1920 Dr. W. A. Potts, Birmingham
- 1921 Professor Wardrop Griffiths, Leeds
- 1922 Professor Louise McIlroy, London
- 1923 Professor Edwin Bramwell
- 1924 Sir Frank Colyer, London
- 1925 Walter Langdon-Brown, London
- 1926 Sir Berkeley Moyhnihan, Bart, Leeds
- 1927 Sir Farquhar Buzzard, London
- 1928 Mr. Dan Mackenzie, F.R.C.S., London
- 1929 Mr. Duncan C. L. Fitzwilliam, F.R.C.S., London
- 1930 Sir Thomas Horder, Bart, K.C.V.O., London
- 1931 Lord Moynihan of Leeds, K.C.M.G., C.B.
- 1932 Professor D.P.D. Wilkie, Edinburgh
- 1933 Sir Charlton Briscoe, Bart, London
- 1934 Col. L.W. Harrison, D.S.O., F.R.C.P., London
- 1935 Lord Dawson of Penn, P.C., G.C.V.O., K.C.B., London
- 1936 Sir Henry Brackenbury, London
- 1937 Sir Maurice Cassidy, London
- 1938 A.E. Barclay, Oxford
- 1946 Professor J.C. Spence, M.D., F.R.C.P., University of Durham
- 1947 Professor R.W. Johnstone, C.B.E., University of Edinburgh
- 1948 Sir Harold Gillies, C.B.E., London
- 1949 Sir Henry Cohen, M.D., F.R.C.P., University of Liverpool
- 1950 Dr. Harley Williams, London
- 1951 Lord Moran of Manton, M.C.
- 1952 Sir Sydney Smith, C.B.E., University of Edinburgh
- 1953 Dr. Keith Simpson, University of London
- 1954 Terence East, King's College Hospital, London
- 1955 Dr. William Pickles, M.D., D.S.C., M.R.C.P., Aysgarth
- 1956 Mr. R.H. Franklin, F.R.C.S., Postgraduate School, London
- 1957 Sir Russell Brain, Bart, London
- 1958 Professor Ian Aird, Postgraduate School, London
- 1959 Professor P. Allison, Oxford
- 1960 Professor Sheila Sherlock, University of London
- 1961 Professor R.E. Lane, University of Manchester
- 1962 Dr. Hugh Garland, Leeds
- 1963 Major-General W.R.M. Drew,
- 1964 Sir Benjamin Rycroft, OBE, London
- 1965 Sir Derrick Dunlop, Edinburgh
- 1966 Professor J.C. McLure Browne, University of London
- 1967 Dr. J.H.F. Brotherston, Edinburgh
- 1968 Emeritus Professor D.F. Cappell, University of Glasgow
- 1969 Sir John Richardson, London
- 1970 Sir Henry Osmond-Clarke, london
- 1971 Dr. C.A.H. Watts, Leicester
- 1972 Sir John Peel, London
- 1973 Lord Foot of Buckland, Monarchorum
- 1974 Ekkehard von Kuenssberg, Edinburgh
- 1975 Dr. J.R. Ellis, London
- 1976 Professor J. Marshall, Institute of Neurology
- 1977 Dr. H.W.S. Francis, Manchester
- 1978 Alastair Currie, Edinburgh
- 1979 Dame Josephine Barnes, London
- 1980 Sir Douglas Ranger, London
- 1981 Sir Ronald Gibson, Winchester
- 1982 Professor Sir John Walton, Newcastle
- 1983 Professor J.D. Scadding, London
- 1984 Dr. Michael O'Donnell
- 1985 H.H.G. Eastcott, London
- 1986 Dr. Michael Trimble, London
- 1987 Professor J. Lejeune, Paris
- 1988 Professor Peter Sleight, Oxford
- 1989 Professor J.S. Scott, Leeds
- 1990 Professor A.W. Clare, Dublin
- 1991 Professor D. Hopkinson, London
- 1992 Professor D. Burrows, Belfast
- 1993 Professor N. McIntyre, London
- 1994 Professor A. Mansfield, London
- 1995 Professor R.H. Higgs, London
- 1996 Professor J.R. Bennett, Hull
- 1997 Dr. J.M. Holt, Oxford
- 1998 Professor Michael Baum, London
- 1999 Lord McColl, London
- 2000 Mr. Peter Leopard, Stoke-on-Trent
- 2001 Professor Lewis Wolpert, London
- 2002 Professor P.R. Bar, Utrecht
- 2003 Professor P. McGuffin, London
- 2004 Dr. C.V. Howard, Liverpool
- 2005 Professor W. Prendiville, Dublin
- 2006 Dr M. Shooter, Cambridge
- 2007 Professor David Haslam
- 2008 Professor A. Templeton
- 2009 Professor Parveen Kumar
- 2010 Dr. P. Hamilton
- 2011 Professor Sir Mark Walport
- 2012 Professor Sir Graeme Catto
- 2013 Professor Christopher Ham CBE
- 2014 Professor Donal O'Donoghue
- 2015 Professor Dame Susan Bailey
- 2016 Professor Philip Cachia
- 2017 Professor John A H Wass
- 2018 The Right Honourable Professor Lord Kakkar
- 2019 Ilora Finlay, Baroness Finlay of Llandaff
- 2020 Dame Clare Gerada
- 2021 Heather Bonney
- 2022 Martin Marshall
- 2023 Lesley Regan
- 2024 Gwen Adshead
- 2025 Professor Bernard Keavney
