= George Ian Scott =

Scottish surgeon (1907–1989)

George Ian Scott CBE, FRSE, FRCSEd
- Born: 15 March 1907; Glasgow, Scotland
- Died: 22 May 1989 (aged 82); Edinburgh, Scotland
- Education: University of Edinburgh
- Occupation: Ophthalmic surgeon
- Known for: First Professor of Ophthalmology, University of Edinburgh; Presidency Royal College of Surgeons of Edinburgh
- Medical career
- Institutions: Royal Infirmary of Edinburgh
- Research: Cataract extraction, diabetic retinopathy
- Notable works: Traquair's clinical perimetry

George Ian Scott (15 March 1907 – 22 May 1989) was a Scottish ophthalmic surgeon who in 1954 became the first holder of the Forbes Chair of Ophthalmology at the University of Edinburgh. He specialised in neuro-ophthalmology, studies of the visual fields and diabetic retinopathy. He was president of the Royal College of Surgeons of Edinburgh from 1964 to 1967, Surgeon-Oculist to the Queen in Scotland from 1965 and president of the Ophthalmological Society of the United Kingdom from 1970 to 1972.

== Early life and education ==
Scott was born in Glasgow on 15 March 1907, the son of George John Scott, an agent for the Union Bank, living at "Pentlands" a villa on Monreith Road in the Newlands district of southern Glasgow. He was educated at St Mary's Preparatory School in Melrose then at Edinburgh Academy (1921–1925). He studied science at the University of Edinburgh graduating Master of Arts (MA) in 1929, before going on to study medicine. He qualified MB ChB in 1933.

== Early clinical career ==
He chose to specialise in ophthalmology and trained at the Royal Infirmary of Edinburgh (RIE) under Harry M. Traquair, one of the pioneers of the scientific and clinical study of the visual fields. Scott joined the succession of ophthalmic surgeons in Edinburgh who promoted the study of the visual pathway and the quantitative measurement of fields of vision. This had begun with George Andreas Berry, who trained under Jannik Bjerrum in Copenhagen in the 1880s, and continued through Arthur H H Sinclair and Traquair. In the course of his own training, Scott witnessed the Danish ophthalmologist Henning Rønne testing visual fields in the Copenhagen Rigshospitalet using the same matt black deeply-panelled double door which Bjerrum himself had used. In this work on perimetry, he provided valuable assistance to Norman M Dott, then pioneering neurosurgery in Edinburgh. He was elected to Fellowship of the Royal College of Surgeons of Edinburgh (FRCSEd) in 1937.

In 1938 Scott was appointed ophthalmic surgeon at Leith Hospital in north Edinburgh, a post which had been held by Sinclair and Traquair earlier in the century. He held this post until 1947.

On the outbreak of the Second World War in 1939 he joined the Royal Army Medical Corps as ophthalmologist to Scottish Command. He then served in the Chemical Defence Experimental Station at Porton Down. He was promoted to the rank of Brigadier in 1942 and became adviser in Ophthalmology to Middle East Forces. There he worked closely alongside and formed an abiding friendship with Sir Stewart Duke-Elder, the leading figure in the specialty during and after the war. Before going to the Middle East he had published papers on diabetic retinopathy and the systemic and topical use of sulphonamides, notably on the topical use of sulphacetamide. Based on his wartime experience he published on neuropathy in prisoners of war and the localisation of intra-ocular foreign bodies.

== Post-war career ==
On his return to Edinburgh he was appointed assistant Ophthalmic Surgeon to the RIE in and in 1953 became Ophthalmic Surgeon-in-Charge. He continued his clinical and research interest in neuro-ophthalmology and diabetes. In the era before sub-specialty interests became fully differentiated, he also published papers on the retinopathy of prematurity and the operative treatment of congenital ptosis, of the lacrimal drainage system and of chronic open angle glaucoma. The latter had been an interest of his distinguished predecessor and holder of the first academic appointment in ophthalmology in Edinburgh, Douglas Argyll Robertson.

In 1954 Scott was appointed as the first holder of the Forbes Chair of ophthalmology of the University of Edinburgh becoming the second professor of ophthalmology to be appointed in the United Kingdom. In his inaugural address on his professorial appointment he reviewed the early pioneers of ophthalmology in Edinburgh. In this address, later published with the title Holism in medicine, he remarked that the development of the faculty of observation was particularly important for undergraduates in medicine, and that ophthalmology offered the opportunity to study the progress of many types of disease affecting the eye, brain and body as a whole.

He believed that the apprenticeship system was the only effective way of producing a competent ophthalmologist, after the trainee had preliminary broad exposure to general medicine, surgery and basic sciences. In an era when hospital doctors in training were expected to deliver much more of the clinical workload than in later years, his view that training should take precedence over service delivery was ahead of its time. He stated: "The routine duties of a registrar tend to make such demands upon his time as to be detrimental to his training. He should be given more time to read and think, and share in clinical research". He established multi-disciplinary groups where problems of concern to physicians, surgeons ophthalmologists and laboratory workers could be considered in all their aspects. Scott called these 'discussion groups' and these were set up by him years before they became a routine part of hospital practice. This was innovative thinking as ophthalmologists had tended to become isolated from other branches of medicine by often working in single specialty hospitals and by the unique terminology they used.

In 1964 along with Sir Arthur Porritt, at that time President of the Royal College of Surgeons of England, he was a founder member of the Royal Commission on Accident Prevention and became an enthusiastic supporter of its work.

Scott's research philosophy warned of the hazards of short-term projects by clinically inexperienced workers and called for intimate linkage between various departments of medicine and science, taking diabetes as an example. He was later to develop close links with the University Department of Psychology and joint clinics with the department of neurology of the RIE. He strengthened the links with optometrists, initially with regard to the use of contact lenses. He further enhanced the multidisciplinary composition of his department with the appointment of a clinical pathologist. His academic department was similarly enhanced with the appointment of a lecturer in ophthalmology, a medical artist and a photographer.

His later surgical interests included techniques of lens extraction, surgery of the lacrimal apparatus and surgery of the eyelid. His medical special interests continued to be neuro-ophthalmology and diabetic retinopathy.

He retired in 1972. Scott had been a main driving force behind the building of the new Princess Alexandra Eye Pavilion and was involved in its design. It was opened in October 1969, as the first part of the redevelopment of the Royal Infirmary of Edinburgh. He spent his final days there and he died on 22 May 1989.

== Awards and honours ==
In 1954 he was elected a Fellow of the Royal Society of Edinburgh (FRSE). His proposers were Sir Robert Muir, Sir James Learmonth, Arthur H. H. Sinclair and Alexander Murray Drennan. In 1956 he was elected a member of the Harveian Society of Edinburgh. He was elected vice president of the Royal College of Surgeons of Edinburgh and when the president James Johnston Mason Brown died in office, Scott assumed the presidency in 1964, becoming the fifth ophthalmologist to hold that office. The four earlier ophthalmologist presidents were Douglas Argyll Robertson, George Andreas Berry, A H H Sinclair and Harry Moss Traquair. Scott also served as President of the Faculty of Ophthalmologists of the Royal Society of Medicine. He became president of the Ophthalmological Society of the United Kingdom from 1970 to 1972. In 1968 he was made a Commander of the Order of the British Empire (CBE).

== Family ==
In 1946 he married Maxine Vandamm in Westminster, London. They had one son John.

== Publications ==
- Scott, G. I. (1957). Traquair's clinical perimetry. 7th ed. London. Kimpton..
- Duke-Elder, S. & Scott, G.I., (1971). System of ophthalmology / Vol.12, Neuro-ophthalmology, London: Kimpton.
