= York Medical Society =

Medical society in York, England

Coordinates: 53.96095°N 1.08306°W

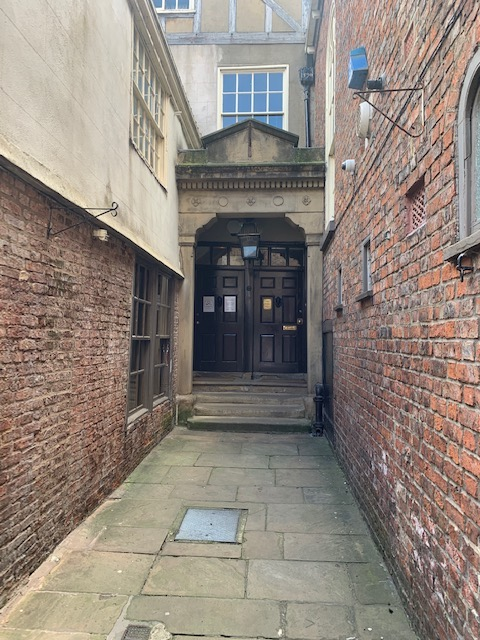
- York Medical Society frontage
- Formation: 1832
- Type: Medical society
- Purpose: Promoting and diffusing medical knowledge
- Location: 23 Stonegate, York, England
- President: Mark Roman
- Website: yorkmedsoc.org

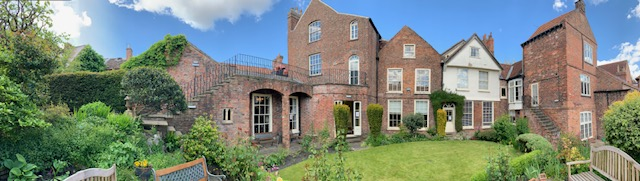
York Medical Society rear view

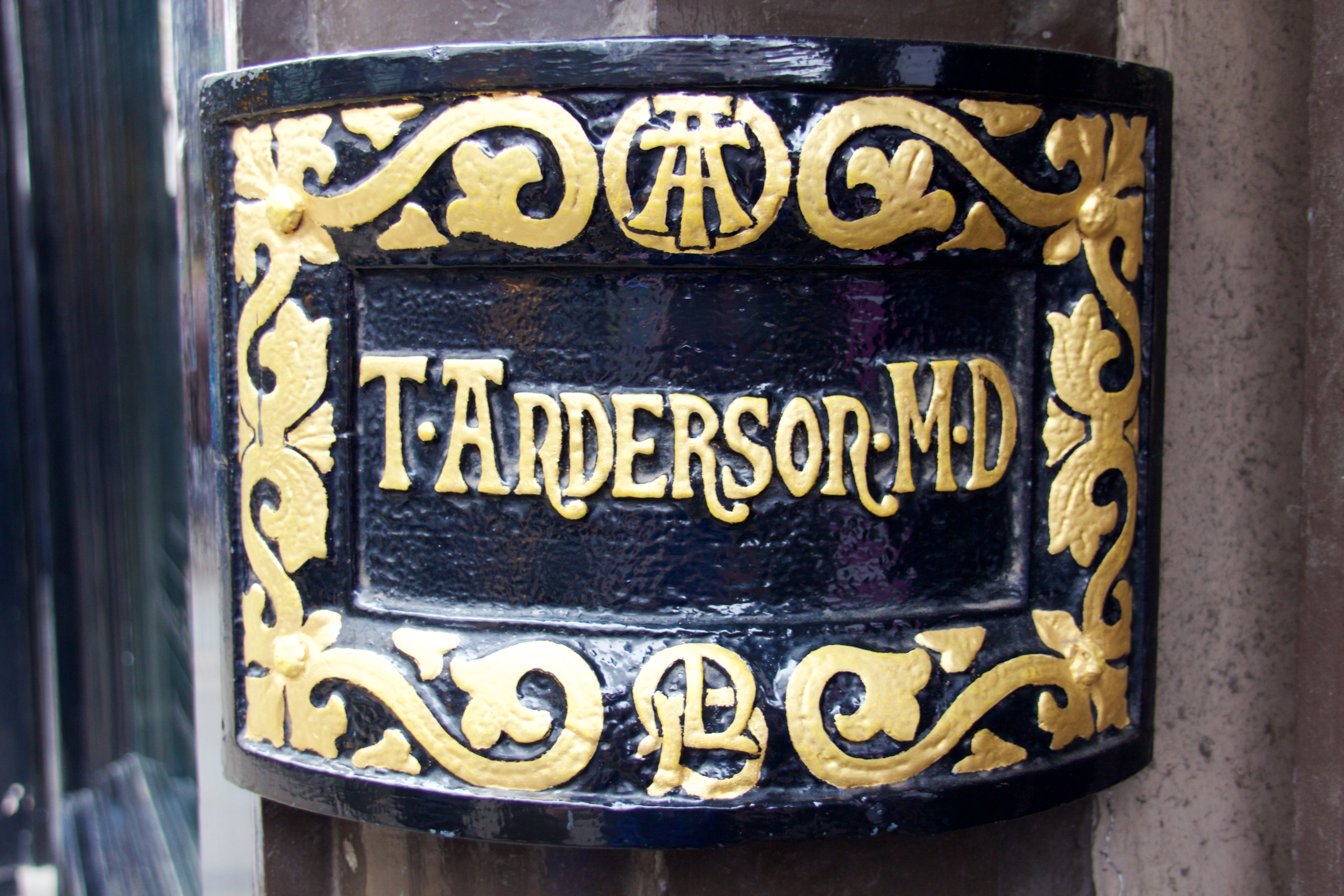
Temperance Anderson's plaque

The York Medical Society is a medical society founded in York, England, in 1832. It is located in a Grade II* listed building at 23 Stonegate.

The first president, Baldwin Wake, addressed the society at its inaugural meeting in March 1832. Early meetings were held at the York Dispensary, a house in Market Town, and later in the board room of York County Hospital, followed by premises at 9 Ousegate. The society then met at the De Grey Rooms and, until 1915, rented rooms at 1 Low Ousegate. In that year it moved to its current home at 23 Stonegate, previously occupied by Tempest Anderson and his father, W. C. Anderson.

The building is a late 16th-century house that incorporates the remains of several earlier structures on the site, and has been altered and extended at various times since its construction. It was first listed in 1954 and upgraded to Grade II* in 1997. It houses a library containing books from the society's own collection as well as volumes from the York County Hospital and the York Dispensary. It holds an annual oration.

== Origins ==
The York Medical Society was founded in 1832, two years before the establishment of York Medical School. Its first president, Baldwin Wake, addressed the society at its inaugural meeting in March 1832.

At first the society had no permanent premises. It met at the York dispensary, then between October 1856 and May 1874 at Mr Graham's house in Market Town. After Graham's death, meetings were held for three years in the board room of York County Hospital, followed by a brief period between 1877 and 1878 at 9 Ousegate. The society then met at the De Grey Rooms for two years, and until 1915 rented rooms at 1 Low Ousegate. In that year it moved to its current home at 23 Stonegate, previously occupied by Tempest Anderson and his father, W. C. Anderson.

The society later developed consulting rooms and a dispensary.

In 2003, its library and archive were transferred to the Borthwick Institute.

== Premises ==
23 Stonegate is a late 16th-century house, which incorporates the remains of several earlier structures on the site, and which has been altered and extended at various times in the centuries following its construction. Its 1590 rainwater head is the oldest surviving in York. The building is currently divided into a number of offices and flats, as well as serving as the base for the society. It has had associations with the medical profession since at least the early 19th century, when it was owned by the Anderson family, and in the later part of the century it was home to the surgeon and vulcanologist Tempest Anderson, whose plaque is still present on the entrance to the building. It was purchased by the York Medical Society in 1944; the dining room, which features a Greek fret and paterae underneath an elaborate cornice, now serves as the society's lecture hall. The building was first listed in 1954, and was upgraded to Grade II* in 1997.

== The library ==
The York Medical Society houses a library consisting of books from its own collection, as well as those from the York County Hospital and the York Dispensary.

== The York Medical Society oration ==
The first oration was given by Jonathan Hutchinson in 1890.

In 1909, when Sir William Osler spoke on "The Beginning of Medicine", he was surprised that rather than a purely medical audience, it was diverse and included the Dean of York. At the following banquet, he gave particular mention to some of the society's well known medical men including Robert Burton and Martin Lister.

Orators in the early years included Sir Clifford Allbutt, Sir Victor Horsley, Sir James Crichton-Browne, Sir German Sims Woodhead, Sir T. Lauder Brunton, Sir George Savage and Sir Norman Moore. In the later years, orators included Parveen Kumar, Graeme Catto, Professor Dame Susan Bailey and Lord Kakkar.

The society holds the "Declaration of Trusts between the Lecturers in the York School of Medicine, 21 May 1841".

In 1893, Victor Horsley visited the society to give its annual oration.

== Exhibitions ==
In 2015, a selection of Raghu Rai's work on the Bhopal disaster was exhibited at the society.

== See also ==
- Grade II* listed buildings in the City of York
- Listed buildings in York (within the city walls, northern part)
