= David Wallace (surgeon) =

Scottish surgeon (1862–1952)

Sir David Wallace KBE CMG FRCSE
- Born: 14 July 1862; Scoonie, Fife, Scotland
- Died: 21 April 1952 (aged 89); Edinburgh, Scotland
- Education: Dollar Academy; University of Edinburgh
- Occupation: Surgeon
- Known for: Presidency Royal College of Surgeons of Edinburgh
- Spouse: Augusta Clouston (m. 1905)
- Children: 2
- Medical career
- Institutions: Royal Infirmary of Edinburgh
- Sub-specialties: Urology

Sir David Wallace KBE CMG FRCSE (14 July 1862 – 21 April 1952) was a Scottish surgeon working in Edinburgh, with a particular interest in urological surgery. During the Boer War he was in charge of the Edinburgh South African Hospital, an experience which impressed upon him the importance of the Red Cross movement in reducing and mitigating the horrors of war. Becoming active in the British Red Cross Society, he was instrumental in forming the Edinburgh branch and was its Chairman for over 30 years. He was knighted in 1920 and elected President of the Royal College of Surgeons of Edinburgh in 1921.

== Early life ==
David Wallace was born on 14 July 1862, in Scoonie, Fife, Scotland. He was the son of David Wallace and his wife Annie (née Anderson) of Balgrummo, Leven, Fife. He was educated at Dollar Academy going on to Edinburgh University medical school and graduating MB, CM from the University of Edinburgh in 1884. After posts in the Royal Infirmary of Edinburgh (RIE) as house surgeon under Professor John Chiene and house physician under Professor John Wylie, he trained as a surgeon, initially working as a demonstrator in anatomy. He then trained for some years under Professor Chiene and it was at this time that his interest in urological surgery developed. He passed the examinations to become M.R.C.S. Eng. in 1886 and the next year became a Fellow of the Royal College of Surgeons of Edinburgh (FRCSEd). He became assistant surgeon in the RIE In 1892.

== War service ==
Wallace saw service in the Boer War as Surgeon in charge of the Edinburgh Hospital in South Africa. This 100-bed hospital opened at Norvalspont in the Northern Cape in May 1890. It remained in service until October 1891, when it was given over to Government. During this campaign Wallace was mentioned in despatches, was awarded the South African Medal and clasp and was appointed to the Order of St Michael and St George (CMG).

His wartime experience had shown him the importance of the British Red Cross Society and he was instrumental in founding the Edinburgh branch and was to become its Honorary Secretary or Chairman for more than 30 years. In 1908 he joined the recently formed Territorial Force, and, along with several other RIE surgeons, including Sir Joseph Cotterill, Charles W Cathcart, George A Berry and Alexis Thomson, he was a member of the surgical staff of the 2nd Scottish General Hospital at Craigleith (later the Western General Hospital). The hospital was mobilised in 1914, but it was felt that because of his knowledge and experience of the Red Cross Society, he could make a greater contribution to the war effort by working in that organisation. He was Red Cross Commissioner for South East Scotland, a post regarded by many as more demanding than an Army command. This involved organising and supervising the many convalescent homes which had been established in south-east Scotland.

== Later career and Death ==
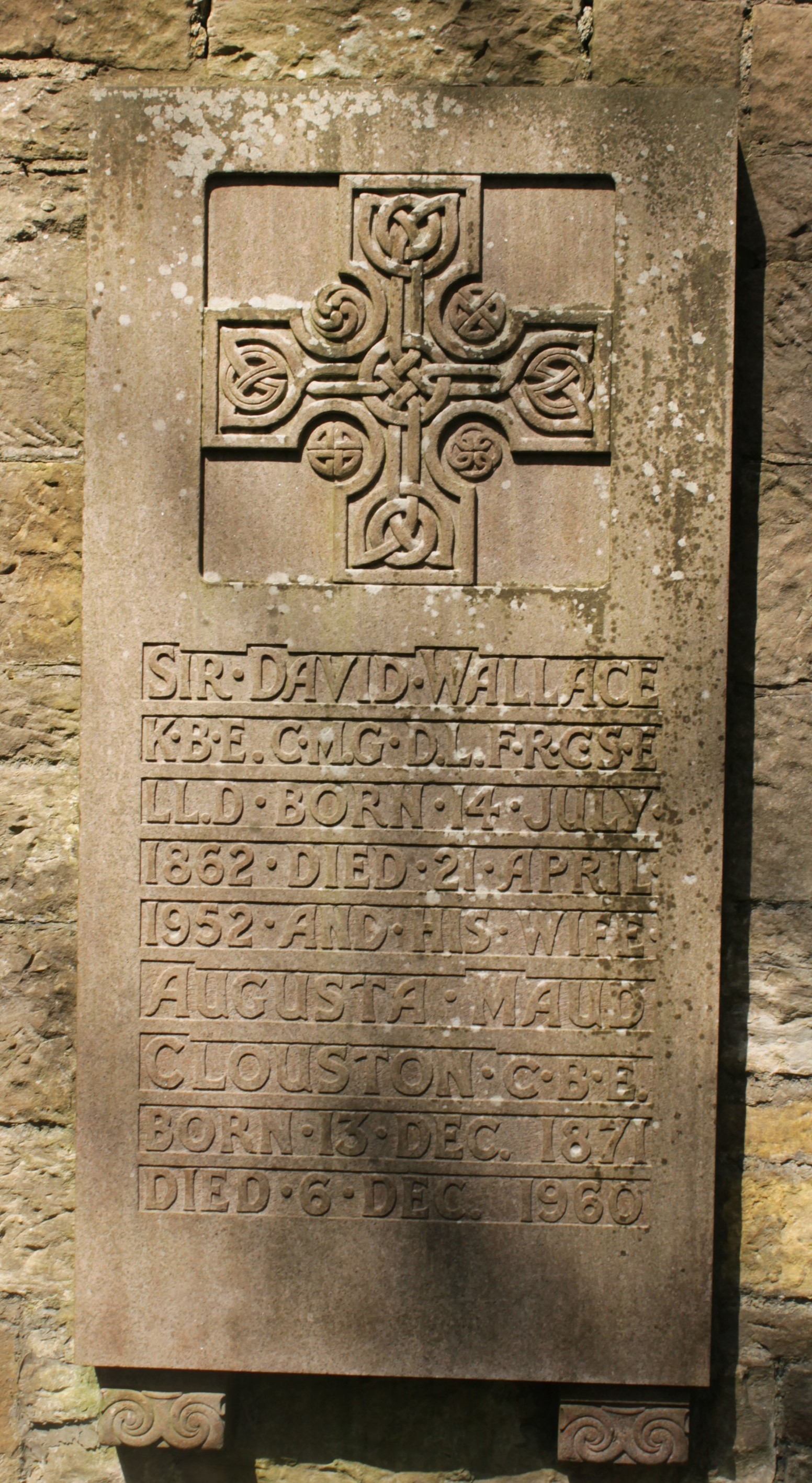
The grave of Sir David Wallace, Dean Cemetery

Wallace had been appointed surgeon in charge of wards in 1908 and held this post for the standard fifteen years. In 1923 he became consulting surgeon. Although a general surgeon he had developed an interest in urological surgery from an early stage. He was regarded as a popular surgical teacher attracting large numbers of students to his surgical classes. After retiring from the RIE he became for many years surgeon to the Edinburgh Hospitals for Incurables, later Longmore Hospital. He died in 1952. His is buried in Dean Cemetery in west Edinburgh. The grave lies in the concealed lower southern terrace.

== Honours and awards ==
Wallace received many honours. He was elected to the French Association of Urology and was President of the Royal College of Surgeons of Edinburgh from 1921 to 1923. In 1889 he was elected a member of the Harveian Society of Edinburgh and served as President in 1924. In 1911 he was elected a member of the Aesculapian Club. He was appointed Deputy Lieutenant of the City of Edinburgh. The University of Edinburgh awarded him the Honorary degree of LLD. For his services he was appointed C.B.E. in 1918 and K.B.E. in 1920.

== Family ==
In 1905 he married Augusta Maud Clouston (1871-1960), daughter of Sir Thomas Clouston. They had two sons.
