= John Campbell McClure Browne =

Browne in 1958.

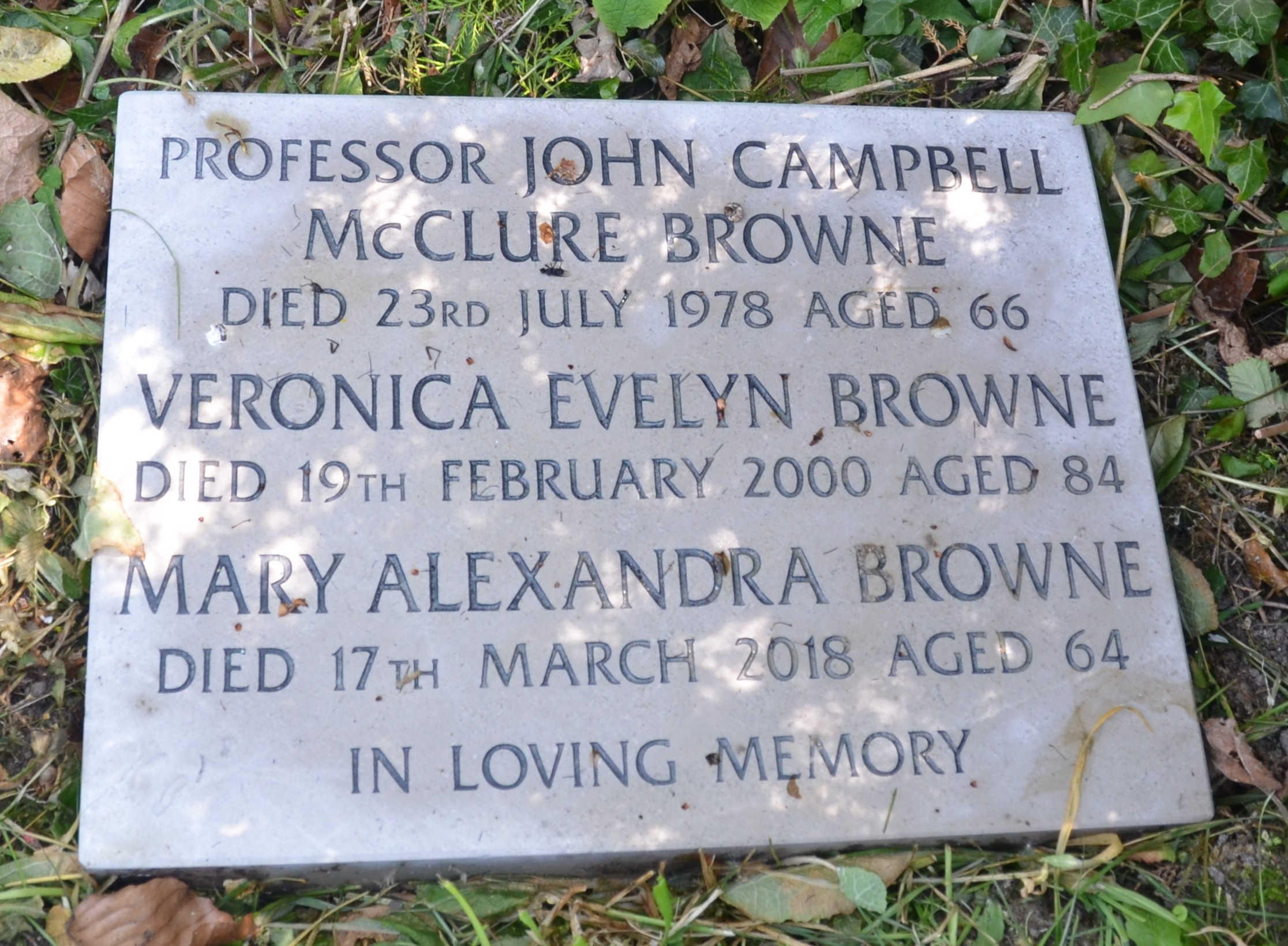
Memorial stone at St Nicholas' Church, Bramber, West Sussex

John Campbell McClure Browne (7 February 1912 – 23 July 1978), was professor of obstetrics and gynaecology at the University of London, known for his studies on the blood circulation of the placenta, microsurgical techniques in female infertility, and prolonged pregnancy.

The son of Francis James Browne, he was educated at University of Edinburgh, then graduated in medicine from University College Hospital in 1938. He served in the Royal Air Force during World War II. Subsequently, he completed his postgraduate training and in 1952 was appointed professor of obstetrics and gynaecology at the Royal Postgraduate Medical School and Institute of Obstetrics of the University of London. He held this post until his retirement.

He was co-author of several standard textbooks, including Antenatal and Postnatal Care (co-authored with his father), Antenatal Care (known commonly as Browne's Antenatal Care) and Postgraduate Obstetrics and Gynaecology,

== See also ==
- Francis James Browne
- List of York Medical Society orators
