= Alexander Edington =

Scots-born bacteriologist and medical author

- Born: 1860; Edinburgh
- Died: 16 July 1928 (aged 67–68); Greytown, Natal

Prof Alexander Edington MD CM FRSE (1860-1928) was a Scots-born bacteriologist and medical author strongly associated with South Africa. He made an important study of the Spanish flu pandemic of 1918.

== Life ==
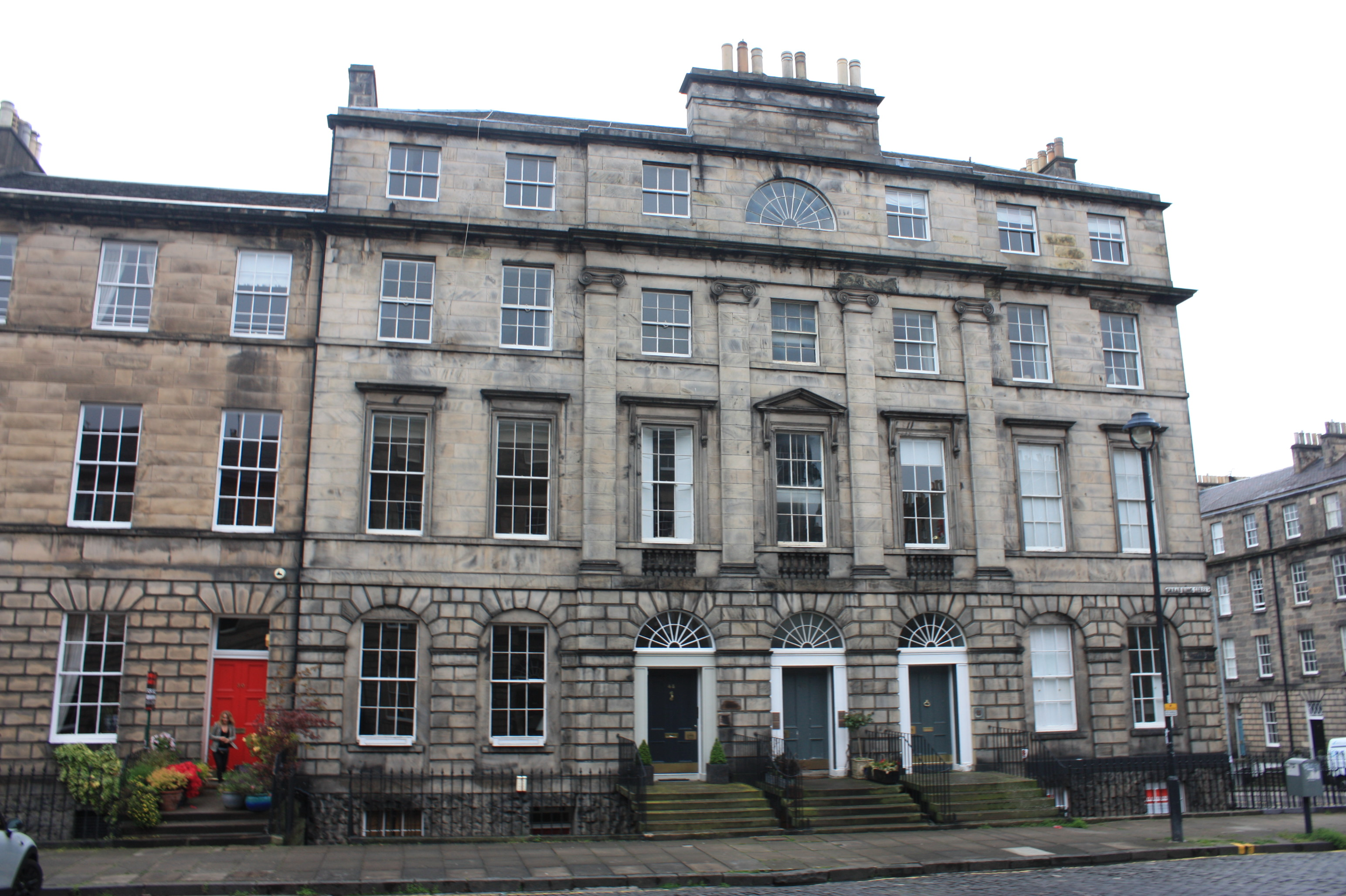
Edington had a two storey house within a large corner block at 44 Great King Street, Edinburgh

He was born in Edinburgh in 1860 and educated at George Watsons College before studying medicine at Edinburgh University. In the 1880s he became assistant surgeon to John Chiene and was then professor of comparative pathology at the Veterinary College in Edinburgh. In 1889 Edington was awarded a doctorate for his thesis, Contribution to surgical pathology and physiology. In 1890 he is listed as living at 44 Great King Street (Note: 44 Great King Street 55°57′28″N 3°12′00″W) in Edinburgh’s Second New Town, an impressive two storey corner flat at ground and garden levels within the corner pavilion.

In 1891 he took a job as colonial bacteriologist and sailed to South Africa. This role appears to have been to gather data on the Rinderpest pandemic of 1890 onwards. Edington's conclusion of his studies was to add glycerine to the animal bile, which had an immunisation effect. His views were controversial, some proved to be incorrect. He also studied rabies in the Eastern Cape.

From 1894 he served as Principal Medical Officer to the Cape Government. In 1893 he was elected a fellow of the Royal Society of Edinburgh. His proposers were Alexander Crum Brown, John Chiene, Leonard Dobbin and Hugh Marshall. He was president of the first medical congress in South Africa and editor of the South African Medical Journal. In 1900 he was awarded a doctorate for his thesis, South-African horse-sickness: its pathology and methods of protective inoculation.

In both the First Boer War and the Second Boer War he both raised and served in the Ambulance Corps based at Grahamstown. He served with distinction in the First World War acting as officer commanding of the South Africa Military Hospital and Senior Medical Officer at Dar-es-Salaam. His official rank was Lt Colonel in the Royal Army Medical Corps. In the 1920s he was medical superintendent to Grey's Hospital (now part of Edendale Hospital) in Pietermaritzburg before going into private practice in Greytown.

He died aged 68 in Greytown, KwaZulu-Natal on 16 July 1928 following a short illness.

== Publications ==
- Contribution to surgical pathology and physiology (Thesis). University of Edinburgh. 1889. hdl:1842/23872.
- South-African horse-sickness: its pathology and methods of protective inoculation (Thesis). University of Edinburgh. 1900a. hdl:1842/23873.
- South African Horse-sickness: Its Pathology and Methods of Protective Inoculation. Harrison and Sons. 1900b.
- "South African Horse-Sickness: Its Pathology and Methods of Protective Inoculation". The Lancet. 156 (4031): 1568–1572. 1900c. Bibcode:1900RSPS...67..292E. doi:10.1016/s0140-6736(01)89022-x. hdl:1842/23873.
- "Preliminary Note on the Occurrence of a New Variety of Trypanosomiasis on the Island of Zanzibar". Proceedings of the Royal Society of London. Series B, Containing Papers of a Biological Character. 80 (544): 545–549. 31 December 1908. Bibcode:1908RSPSB..80..545E. doi:10.1098/rspb.1908.0050. JSTOR 80284.
- "Some Remarks on Spanish Influenza: Its Nature and Ætiology". The Lancet. 194 (5017): 730–731. 1919. doi:10.1016/s0140-6736(01)48855-6.
