= Melville Greig Kerr =

Melville Grieg Kerr
- Born: 2 December 1929
- Died: 25 January 2020 (aged 90); Edinburgh
- Occupations: Professor of obstetrics and gynaecology
- Medical career
- Institutions: University of Edinburgh; University of Calgary

Melville Grieg Kerr (2 December 1929 – 25 January 2020) was a Scottish obstetrician and gynaecologist, who was Professor of Obstetrics and Gynaecology at the University of Edinburgh and Professor of Obstetrics and Gynaecology at the University of Calgary.

He was Professor of Obstetrics and Gynaecology at the University of Edinburgh from 1974 to 1977, before moving to the Cumming School of Medicine at the University of Calgary.

In 1986 he became Director of the Division of International Development, with the University's International Centre.

He had a particular interest in Evidence Based Medicine, and international medication, developing partnerships with institutions, particularly in Nepal and the Philippines.

== Publications ==
=== Books ===
- Kerr, Melville (1996). Partnering and health development : the Kathmandu connection. Calgary: University of Calgary Press and International Development Research Centre. ISBN 1895176735.

=== Research papers ===
- Kerr, MG (April 1968). "Immunological rejection as a cause of abortion". Journal of Reproduction and Fertility. Supplement. 3: Suppl 3:49-55. PMID 4942563.
- Kerr, MG (June 1969). "Infertility in women clinically attributed to uterine factors". Journal of Reproduction and Fertility. Supplement. 8: Suppl 8:1-8. PMID 4917713.

Academic offices
| Preceded by Robert James Kellar | Professor of Obstetrics and Gynaecology, Edinburgh; 1974–1977 | Succeeded by David Tennent Baird |
