= Robert James Kellar =

Robert James Kellar CBE FRCS FRCP
- Born: 30 May 1909; Edinburgh
- Died: 9 October 1980 (aged 71)
- Education: George Watson's College, University of Edinburgh
- Occupations: Professor of obstetrics and gynaecology
- Medical career
- Institutions: University of Edinburgh

Robert James Kellar (30 May 1909 - 9 October 1980) was a Scottish obstetrician and gynaecologist.

== Education and training ==
He was educated at George Watson's College and the University of Edinburgh, registering as a Medical Student at Edinburgh in November 1926, and joining the Medical Register in August 1931.

He was assistant to Francis James Browne at University College Hospital, London.

He was a Beit Memorial Fellow for Medical Research in 1935.

== Wartime service ==
He was a member of the Territorial Army and served as a lieutenant-colonel in charge of the surgical unit of the 9th General Hospital at Heliopolis during WW2, for which he was awarded the MBE.

== Professor of Obstetrics and gynaecology ==
He was chair of Obstetrics and Gynaecology at Edinburgh University for 28 years, from 1946 to 1974. He succeeded Robert William Johnstone in the role, and was succeeded by Melville Greig Kerr.

During his time as head of Obstetrics and Gynaecology his Registrar, Nancy Mann, became engaged to Dr John Loudon, and Professor Kellar insisted on her resignation, declaring that there was no place for a married woman in obstetrics. Two years later John Louson became his registrar. Nancy Loudon went on to have a prominent role in obstetrics and family planning, receiving an OBE in 1992.

He was elected a member of the Aesculapian Club in 1958 and a CBE in the 1968 New Year Honours.

== Family ==
He married Gertrude Crawford Aitken (1907-1980), and they had two sons, David and Richard Bruce (1937 - December 9, 2019, aged 82), and a daughter, Gillian. He died on 9 October 1980 and is buried at Carlisle Cemetery, along with his wife, and son Richard.

Academic offices
Preceded by Robert William Johnstone	Professor of Obstetrics and Gynaecology, Edinburgh; 1946-1974	Succeeded by Melville Greig Kerr
