= Tom Philp =

Scottish consultant radiologist

Thomas Philp FRCP(Ed), FRCR (19 April 1923 – 18 December 1994) was a Scottish consultant radiologist.

== Early life ==
Philp was educated at Strathallan School in Perthshire and the University of Edinburgh, graduating (MB, ChB) in 1945. Between 1946 and 1948 he completed his national service with the Royal Army Medical Corps serving in West Africa and India attaining the rank of major.

== Radiologist ==
On his return to Edinburgh, Philp joined the Radiology Department at the Royal Infirmary, Edinburgh where he was appointed registrar 1951, senior registrar in 1952 and senior hospital medical officer in 1953. He became a Fellow of the Royal College of Radiologists and was appointed consultant at the Royal Infirmary, Edinburgh in 1956.

Philp conducted extensive research in cardiovascular radiology at a time when traditional radiological techniques were undergoing an evolutionary period. In 1971, he was awarded a World Health Organization travelling fellowship to Japan where he researched new developments in gastrointestinal radiology.

In 1975, Philp was treasurer of the IIIrd European Congress of Radiology in Edinburgh. His signature contribution was to set up an investment trust for the benefit of radiologists. Philp was awarded the Boris Rajewsky Medal in the same year by the European Association of Radiology for his contributions to radiology. In 1980 he was elected a member of the Aesculapian Club.

From 1978-1979, he served as president of the Scottish Radiological Society. Between 1978 and 1986 he was in administrative charge of the Radiology Department at the Royal Infirmary, Edinburgh; chairman of various radiological and medical committees, and an examiner for the Royal College of Radiologists.

Philp served as treasurer of the Royal College of Radiologists from 1983-1988. He retired from the Royal Infirmary, Edinburgh in 1986.
