= George John Romanes (anatomist) =

Scottish anatomist

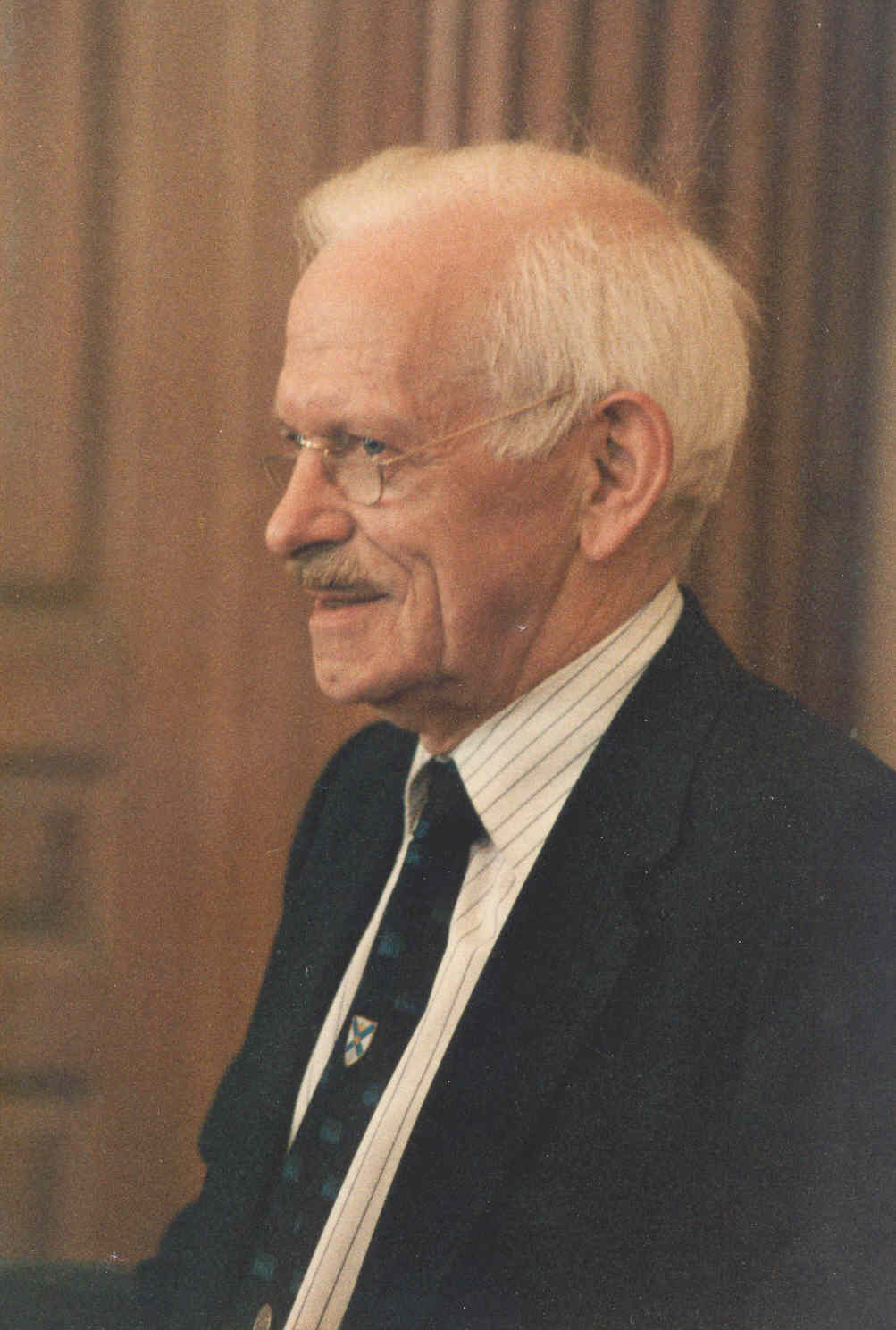
- Romanes in 1984
- Born: 2 December 1916; Edinburgh
- Died: 9 April 2014 (aged 97); Isle of Skye
- Title: Professor of Anatomy
- Awards: C.B.E, F.R.S.Ed., B.A., Ph.D., M.B., ChB., D.Sc.(h.c.), F.R.C.S.Ed., F.R.S.E., H.R.S.A.

George John Romanes CBE was an anatomist. Born in Edinburgh in 1916, he received his education at the Edinburgh Academy, the University of Cambridge, and the University of Edinburgh.

== Career ==
At Cambridge, Romanes studied for the Natural Sciences Tripos, graduating with a B.A. in 1938. In 1941, he returned to Edinburgh to finish the clinical part of his medical course and graduated with an M.B., Ch.B. in 1944. He then returned to Cambridge for two years as a Beit Memorial Fellow for Medical Research.

In 1942, he completed a Ph.D. in Anatomy during the tenure of a Marmaduke Shield Scholarship (1938–40), and a Demonstratorship in Anatomy.

In 1946, Romanes was appointed Lecturer in Neuro-anatomy in Edinburgh and spent 1949–50 in the Department of Neurology at Columbia University, New York funded by a Commonwealth Fund Fellowship. In 1954, he succeeded J.C. Brash as Professor of Anatomy, becoming the twelfth holder of the chair since its institution in 1705. In 1956 he was elected a member of the Harveian Society of Edinburgh. In 1962 he was elected a member of the Aesculapian Club.

He served as Chairman of the Royal Infirmary of Edinburgh Board of Management (1959), and Dean of the Faculty of Medicine at the University of Edinburgh (1979–1983). For 21 years he edited the Journal of Anatomy and Cunningham's Textbook of Anatomy and the associated Manuals of Dissection.

He retired in 1984, having spent 45 years as a member of the University's staff.

== Publications ==
Romanes published papers demonstrating that the large neurons in the spinal cord that supply individual muscles are clustered together in discrete, nuclei-termed pools that are arranged according to the position of the limb muscles they are programmed to innervate. In a paper published in 1951, Romanes showed that the pools of motor neurons innervating the muscles that act together to control a limb joint are themselves grouped into larger clusters – thus uncovering a positional registration between a motor neuron and its target muscle. Romanes reasoned that “all the higher parts of the central nervous system would be organized in a similar, basic way," a premise that is now gathering experimental support.

His contemporaries used his maps to identify the pathognomonic lesions of motoneurones seen in the polio epidemic that was sweeping the United States of America. Modern workers using transgenic mice have confirmed the genetically-determined location of the motor neuron pools and shown the rest of the spinal cord network, including the connection of the sensory nerves, to be dependent on the positional template described first by Romanes.
