= James Johnston Mason Brown =

Scottish paediatric surgeon (1908–1964)

James Johnston Mason Brown OBE, FRCSEd
- Born: 28 February 1908; St Andrews, Scotland
- Died: 9 June 1964 (aged 56); Edinburgh, Scotland
- Education: Edinburgh Academy; University of Edinburgh
- Occupation: Paediatric surgeon
- Known for: President British Association of Paediatric Surgeons; President Royal College of Surgeons of Edinburgh
- Medical career
- Institutions: Royal Hospital for Sick Children, Edinburgh
- Sub-specialties: Paediatric surgery
- Notable works: The Surgery of Childhood

James Johnston Mason Brown OBE, FRCSEd (28 February 1908 – 9 June 1964) was a Scottish paediatric surgeon. During World War II he served as a surgical specialist with the 8th Army in North Africa and Italy and was awarded the OBE for this service. As surgeon-in-chief at the Royal Hospital for Sick Children in Edinburgh, he edited the major textbook The Surgery of Childhood. He was the joint founder of the Scottish Surgical Paediatric Society and a founder member of the British Association of Paediatric Surgeons (BAPS), of which he became president. He was elected President of the Royal College of Surgeons of Edinburgh (RCSEd) in 1962 but died in office aged 56 years.

== Early life ==
Mason Brown was born in St Andrews in 1908, the son of David Harley Brown and his wife Catherine (née Mason). He grew up in Edinburgh and was educated at the Edinburgh Academy. While a schoolboy he developed appendicitis and became seriously ill with peritonitis. He was successfully operated on by Sir John Fraser and this early contact with surgery was a decisive influence on his choice of career. He entered the medical faculty of the University of Edinburgh in 1926 and five years later graduated MB ChB with honours and the award of the Pattison Prize in Clinical Surgery.

His earliest postgraduate appointments were resident house officer posts, first in the Royal Infirmary of Edinburgh (RIE) with Professor Sir John Fraser, who had saved his life some years earlier and, secondly with Norman Dott at the Royal Hospital for Sick Children (RHSC). He then became clinical tutor in the Surgical Outpatient Department of the RIE where he started his research on the ischaemic bone condition osteochondritis dissecans, which earned for him the Syme Surgical Fellowship. He obtained the Fellowship of the Royal College of Surgeons of Edinburgh (FRCSEd) in 1934, but even before this, Sir John Fraser had invited him to be his private assistant. He went on to become clinical tutor and then University lecturer in surgery under Sir John in the RIE.

== Early surgical career ==
In 1936 Mason Brown was appointed Assistant Surgeon to the RHSC, where his senior colleague was the first woman paediatric surgeon in Scotland, Gertrude Herzfeld, but at this stage he was not yet totally committed to paediatric surgery. In 1937 he was awarded a Crichton Scholarship for research on peripheral vascular disease.

Before World War II he had become a Territorial Officer in the Royal Army Medical Corps, and on the outbreak of war in September 1939 he was called up for military service. Initially he served as regimental Medical Officer to the 7th/9th Battalion of the Royal Scots (the "Dandy Ninth"). Later he went overseas as a surgical specialist with the 31st General Hospital. With other colleagues including James Ross he published a paper giving an account of the work of a casualty clearing station. Thereafter, with the rank of Lieutenant Colonel, he commanded the surgical division of the 70th General Hospital in North Africa and Italy. His surgical division was selected to form the Vascular Injuries Centre for the British Forces in the Mediterranean theatre and he later published an account of this experience.

== Post-war career ==
When the war ended in 1945, Mason Brown returned to the RHSC in Edinburgh where, after Ian Aird had moved to the Chair of Surgery at the Postgraduate Medical School in London and Miss Herzfeld had retired, he became surgeon-In-chief. He was also paediatric surgeon to the Western General Hospital and the Simpson Memorial Maternity Pavilion.

He was well suited for this post as he had a natural rapport with children. His operative expertise covered the entire field of surgical paediatrics but his special interest was neonatal surgery.

Mason Brown was regarded as an excellent clinical teacher and lecturer. He earned a reputation for the precision and clarity of his writing and he made many contributions to paediatric surgical literature.

His greatest educational achievement was the publication, in 1962, of The Surgery of Childhood, of which he was editor in chief. In this capacity he led a team of 27 distinguished authors in the production of what was the first major British textbook of paediatric surgery since the publication 18 years earlier of Sir John Fraser's single-handed magnum opus bearing the same title.

In 1948, together with Matthew White, a Glasgow paediatric surgeon, Mason Brown founded the Scottish Surgical Paediatric Society and in 1953 he was one of those responsible for the foundation of the British Association of Paediatric Surgeons (BAPS). At the first meeting he was made a member of the founding executive together with Denis Browne (the first president), David Waterston, Peter Paul Rickham, and Harold Nixon.

Mason Brown was appointed Secretary and Treasurer of the RCSEd in 1949 and continued as Secretary until 1962, which gave him an in-depth knowledge of the College's history and laws and administrative procedures. He was elected President in 1962, the first specialist paediatric surgeon to hold this office. Soon after becoming President of the RCSEd he was elected President of BAPS.

== Family ==
He married Louie Johnston in 1939 and they had two children.

== Death and legacy ==
Mason Brown died in office in 1964 aged 56. He was succeeded as president of the RCSEd by the Vice-President Professor George Scott. He is commemorated by the Mason Brown Memorial Lectureship which every two years is awarded jointly by the RCSEd and the British Association of Paediatric Surgeons.

== Honours and awards ==
For his contributions in this specialised field of military surgery, he was mentioned in dispatches and appointed Officer of the Order of the British Empire (OBE). In 1951 he was elected a member of the Harveian Society of Edinburgh and in 1959 was elected a member of the Aesculapian Club. He was chosen as the first "James IV surgical traveller" by the James IV Association of Surgeons in 1961 and in this capacity toured surgical centres in North America. In 1963 he was conferred with honorary fellowship by the Royal College of Physicians and Surgeons of Glasgow.

== Selected publications ==
- Brown, JJ (1945). "Wounds of soft tissue: Two-stage treatment". Lancet. 245 (6350): 588–590. doi:10.1016/S0140-6736(45)90396-5.
- Brown, JJ (1948). "Some experiences in the treatment of arterial injuries". Bristol Med Chir J (1883). 65: 105–10. PMC 5065808. PMID 18123515.
- Brown, JJ (1940). "Experience at a Casualty Clearing Station". Lancet. 236 (6111): 443–445.
- Surgery of Childhood. London: Arnold, 1962.
- Acute appendicitis in infancy and childhood. London: Institute of Child Health, University of London. 1956
