= Francis James Browne =

Professor of obstetrics and gynaecology

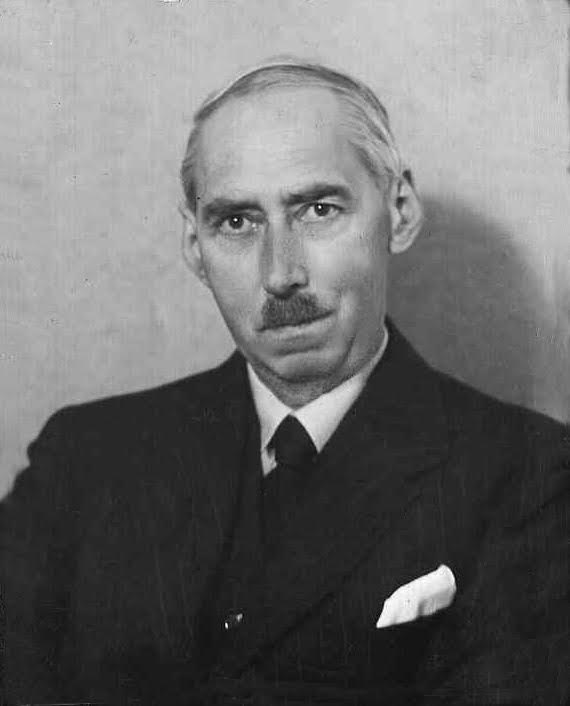
Francis James Browne

Francis James Browne (1879–1963) was professor of obstetrics and gynaecology and first director of the obstetric unit at University College Hospital, London, which was opened in 1926. He was known as "FJ".

Browne was appointed professor at the University of London and the first full-time director of the newly established Obstetric Unit, opened by the Prince of Wales in 1926.

Browne established a modern labour ward service, with one senior sister in charge and improved antiseptic and aseptic techniques. He instituted antenatal and postnatal clinics and recruited many (later distinguished) assistants, including Leslie Williams, Harold Malkin, Chassar Moir, Robert Kellar, Vivian Barnes, Max Rosenheim, Josephine Barnes and Aileen Dickens.

He re-organised the teaching of medical students, and residential accommodation was provided. Systematic teaching of obstetric and gynaecological dressers was introduced. Standards of the district obstetric service were greatly improved, an important service in the days when most deliveries were still domiciliary.

Browne was a fellow of the Royal Society of Medicine and a member of the Gynaecological Visiting Society (GVS), elected in 1927. He became a founding fellow of the College of Obstetricians and Gynaecologists (1929). He was president of the (RSM) Section of Obstetrics and Gynaecology for the 1945/6 session.

In 1947, he was invited to give the first William Meredith Fletcher Shaw Memorial Lecture. His subject was hypertension in pregnancy, summarising his life's work.

== Biography ==
Browne was born on 1 October 1879 to William and Sarah Browne, in Tullybogly, County Donegal, Ireland, a small community 25 miles west of Derry. He was the fourth of eight children, and attended Balleighan Primary school.

He studied medicine at Aberdeen University on a scholarship, starting in 1901. In 1902, he was awarded the Thompson Bursary for medical students entering their second year. He qualified MB ChB, passing his finals in 1906 with 'highest honours' and distinctions in pathology, medical jurisprudence, and public health.

Browne worked as colliery doctor at the Arrael Griffin (Six Bells) Colliery in Abertillery in South Wales.

The obstetric experience in Abertillery triggered a lasting interest in the subject, and led to the desire to specialize in this branch of medicine. Browne had attended postgraduate courses in London (1911) and Edinburgh (1912 and 1913), and in 1918 he took time off his practice to do a 3-month resident post at the Edinburgh Royal Infirmary.

Following his short period as a gynaecological resident, Browne wrote on 18 November 1918 to Dr. John Ballantyne, one of the teachers on the postgraduate courses he had attended, applying for the post of obstetric resident at the Simpson Memorial Hospital in Edinburgh. Ballantyne (1861–1923) was the outstanding pioneer of antenatal care.

During the First World War, he served as an officer with the Royal Army Medical Corps. He was a foundation fellow of the Royal College of Obstetricians and Gynaecologists.

Browne was admitted to the fellowship of the Edinburgh Obstetric Society in 1919, and became a regular attender and presenter of papers at the society's meetings, later becoming editor of the Transactions. He was invited to join the Medical Research Council in 1921 and investigated, in collaboration with Dr WR Logan, the causes of abortion and intrauterine death. He wrote on intranatal infection and pre-eclampsia and investigated the fetal age, length and weight of over 600 fetuses delivered at various stages of pregnancy.

In 1923, Browne was appointed assistant physician at the Edinburgh Royal Infirmary and the Simpson Memorial Pavilion. Ballantyne (who died that year) referred to his "sterling quality of frankness, fairness and loyalty. He has an infectious enthusiasm for his work and in his writing he marshals his facts with logical accuracy and force."

Clinical duties and research now became Browne's main priorities. In addition, he was recognised as the outstanding teacher of medical students in Edinburgh. In 1925 he was awarded the Edinburgh DSc (Doctor of Science) degree and promoted to chief physician.

A Royal Commission on university education in London had recommended in 1913 the establishment of clinical professorial units in the London medical schools. In 1919, a generous offer by the Rockefeller Foundation was made, firstly to Oxford University but subsequently to University College Hospital, London, leading to the establishment in 1920 of new medical and surgical units at UCH. A new obstetric hospital was built, the foundation stone being laid by King George V in 1923, and opened by the Prince of Wales in 1926. Browne was appointed professor at the University of London and the first full-time director of the newly established Obstetric Unit, and held the post until his retirement in 1946. He established a modern labour ward service, with one senior sister in charge and improved antiseptic and aseptic techniques.

His first assistants were Leslie Williams and Harold Malkin, both of whom become distinguished consultants in due course. Among the most famous of his assistants were Chassar Moir who joined the UCH obstetric unit in 1929 and Max Rosenheim who came from the medical unit to the obstetric unit in 1934. Other assistants included Norman White and Tim Flew who both became consultants at UCH, Robert (later Professor) Kellar, Vivian Barnett, Fouracre Barnes, Aileen Dickens and Josephine Barnes.

He died on 17 August 1963.

== Publications ==
- Advice to the Expectant Mother on the Care of Her Health. Francis James Browne. Edinburgh: Livingston, 1926.
- Antenatal and Postnatal Care. Francis James Browne. London: Churchill, 1935.
- Obstetric Technique: Methods in Use in the Obstetric Unit, University College Hospital, London. F J Browne. Shrewsbury: Wilding & Son Ltd, 1937.
- Post Graduate Obstetrics & Gynacology. F J Browne. London: Butterworth, 1950.
- ibid F J Browne & J C McC Browne. 1955 (2nd edn).
- Advice to the Expectant Mother on the Care of Her Health. F J Browne & J C McC Browne. Edinburgh & London: Livingston, 1957 (11th edn).
- Antenatal and Postnatal Care (9th edition). F J Browne & J C McC Browne. London: Churchill, 1960.
- Advice to the Expectant Mother on the Care of Her Health and That of Her Child. F J Browne, J C McC Browne, J P M Tizard. 1962 (12th edn).
- ibid 1966 (13th edn).
- Browne's Antenatal Care. F J Browne. 1 January 1970.
