= Robert William Johnstone =

Scottish obstetrician and gynaecologist

Robert William Johnstone CBE, FRSE, FRCSEd, FRCOG
- Born: 11 August 1879; Edinburgh, Scotland
- Died: 27 November 1969 (aged 90); Edinburgh, Scotland
- Education: George Watson's College; University of Edinburgh
- Known for: Professor of Midwifery and Gynaecology, University of Edinburgh; President of the Royal College of Surgeons of Edinburgh
- Children: 4

Robert William Johnstone (11 August 1879– 27 November 1969) was a Scottish obstetrician and gynaecologist. For some 20 years he was Professor of Midwifery and Gynaecology at the University of Edinburgh. He was a founding Fellow and subsequently vice-president of the Royal College of Obstetricians and Gynaecologists. He served as president of the Royal College of Surgeons of Edinburgh from 1943 to 1945.

== Early life and education ==
He was born in Newington, Edinburgh in 1879, the son of Rev William Johnstone DD and his wife Janet (née Brocon). His father was Professor of Divinity at the United Presbyterian College in Edinburgh. After schooling at George Watson's College, Edinburgh he entered Faculty of Arts at the University of Edinburgh, qualifying MA in 1900 and, having entered the faculty of Medicine, qualified MBChB with honours three years later.

== Career ==
After resident posts in Edinburgh he had decided on a career in obstetrics, working initially at the Vienna clinic of Ernst Wertheim, the pioneer of radical hysterectomy. Moving to Prague he spent time researching and studying at the clinics of von Franque and von Jaksche where his research would form the basis of a thesis for which he was awarded the degree of MD with honours in 1906. That same year he qualified MRCPE and FRCSEd. He became assistant to Sir John Halliday Croom, the professor of obstetrics and gynaecology. and appointed as a lecturer in the university department.

During World War I he served as medical officer in the Royal Victoria (Red Cross) Hospital in Edinburgh. After being commissioned in the Royal Army Medical Corps he served as surgical specialist at the No. 3 General Hospital in France. Recalled to London he was Deputy Commissioner (Medical Services) at the War Office and then Commissioner at the Ministry of National Service. After the war he was lecturer at the School of Medicine of the Royal Colleges of Edinburgh. In 1920 he began working at the Edinburgh Royal Maternity Hospital and in 1922 he became Assistant Gynaecologist to the Edinburgh Royal Infirmary .

From 1926 to 1946 he was Professor of Midwifery and Gynaecology at Edinburgh University succeeding Benjamin Philip Watson. He was succeeded in turn by Robert James Kellar. His main contributions to the literature were his Textbook of Midwifery for Students and Practitioners, first published in 1913 and which, by the time of his death had run to a remarkable 21 editions. His biography of the Scottish obstetrician William Smellie was published in 1952.

He retired in 1946 and died in Edinburgh in 1969.

== Honours and awards ==
He was appointed CBE in 1920, From 1936 to 1939 he was vice-president of the Royal College of Obstetricians and Gynaecologists. He served as president of the Royal College of Surgeons of Edinburgh from 1943 to 1945. In 1937 he was elected a member of the Aesculapian Club and served as Honorary Secretary from 1955 to 1958. In 1907 he was elected a member of the Harveian Society of Edinburgh and in 1948 served as President. In 1950 he was awarded the honorary degree of LLD by the University of Edinburgh. He served for many years as chairman of the Central Midwives Board for Scotland.

== Publications ==
- William Smellie. The Master of British Midwifery. Edinburgh. E&S Livingstone. (1952)
- A Textbook of Midwifery for Students and Practitioners. London. A & C Black. (1913) Twenty-first edition with R J Kellar. A&C Black (1968)
- A Midwife's Textbook of the Principles and Practice of Midwifery London. A&C Black.(1944) Eighth edition . A&C Black (1962)

== Artistic recognition ==
His portrait by David Alison is held by Edinburgh University.

Academic offices
Preceded by Benjamin Philip Watson	Professor of Midwifery and Gynaecology, Edinburgh; 1926-1946	Succeeded by Robert James Kellar
