= George Savage (physician) =

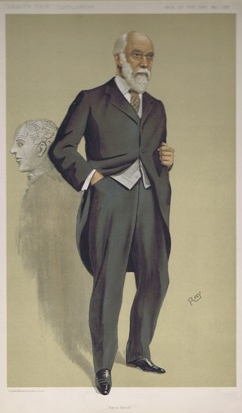
"Mens Sana" Savage as caricatured in Vanity Fair, February 1912

Sir George Henry Savage (12 November 1842 – 5 July 1921) was a prominent English psychiatrist.

== Early life ==
Savage was born in Brighton in 1842, the son of a chemist. Educated at Brighton College, he served an internship at Guy's Hospital from 1861. After 1865, he was resident at Guy's; he earned his MD in 1867. He remained a regular lecturer at the hospital for decades after.

During his time as a doctor for a mining company in Nenthead, he met his wife, Margaret Walton; however, she died after a year of marriage. They had one child.

== Bethlem and private practice ==
Shortly after his wife's death Savage accepted an appointment as an assistant medical officer at Bethlem Royal Hospital. By 1878 he had become chief medical officer at the hospital; in the same year, he became MRCP.

Also from 1878 to 1894 Savage co-edited the Journal of Mental Science — which changed its name to The British Journal of Psychiatry in 1963 — with Thomas Clouston and Daniel Hack Tuke. He published regularly in this journal until the end of his career. At Bethlem and after he was sparing in his use of chemical sedation, although his freedom with physical restraint drew criticism from Henry Maudsley, J. C. Bucknill, and others.

Over the course of the 1880s private practice took up more of Savage's time; he retired from Bethlem in 1888 to devote himself entirely to private practice. In 1882 he married Adelaide Sutton, the daughter of another doctor.

He drew his private clientele from wealthy or well-connected London society. Virginia Woolf saw him intermittently for a decade, and he is among the figures lampooned in the Sir William Bradshaw of Mrs. Dalloway. At the same time, he worked as a consultant for a number of asylums, and was often called in on especially difficult cases.

His major public work was Insanity and Allied Neuroses, a reference book for students; published in 1884, it was revised and reissued in 1894 and 1907. In 1909 he delivered the Harveian Oration to the Royal College of Physicians on the subject of Experimental Psychology and Hypnotism. He was knighted in 1912.

== Bibliography ==
- Andrews, Jonathan (2004). "Sir George Savage." Oxford Dictionary of National Biography. Retrieved September 26, 2007.
- Bynum, William, et al. (2004). The Anatomy of Madness: Essays in the History of Psychiatry. London: Taylor and Francis.
- Fennell, Phil (1996). Treatment Without Consent. London: Routledge.
- Freeman, Hugh (1999). A Century of Psychiatry. London: Mosby.
- Savage, G.H., Insanity and Allied Neuroses: Practical and Clinical, Cassell and Company Limited, (London), 1884.
- Savage, G.H., Insanity and Allied Neuroses: Practical and Clinical (Second Edition), Cassell and Company Limited, (London), 1886.
- Savage, G.H., Insanity and Allied Neuroses: Practical and Clinical (Third Edition), Cassell and Company Limited, (London), 1891.
- Savage, G.H., Insanity and Allied Neuroses: Practical and Clinical (Fourth Edition), Cassell and Company Limited, (London), 1893.
- Savage, G.H,The Harveian Oration on Experimental Psychology and Hypnotism Delivered before the Royal College of Physicians of London, October 18, 1909, Henry Frowde, (London), 1909.
- Trombley, Stephen (1981). All That Summer She Was Mad: Virginia Woolf and her Doctors. London: Junction Books.
