= Henry Alexis Thomson =

Scottish anatomist and medical author

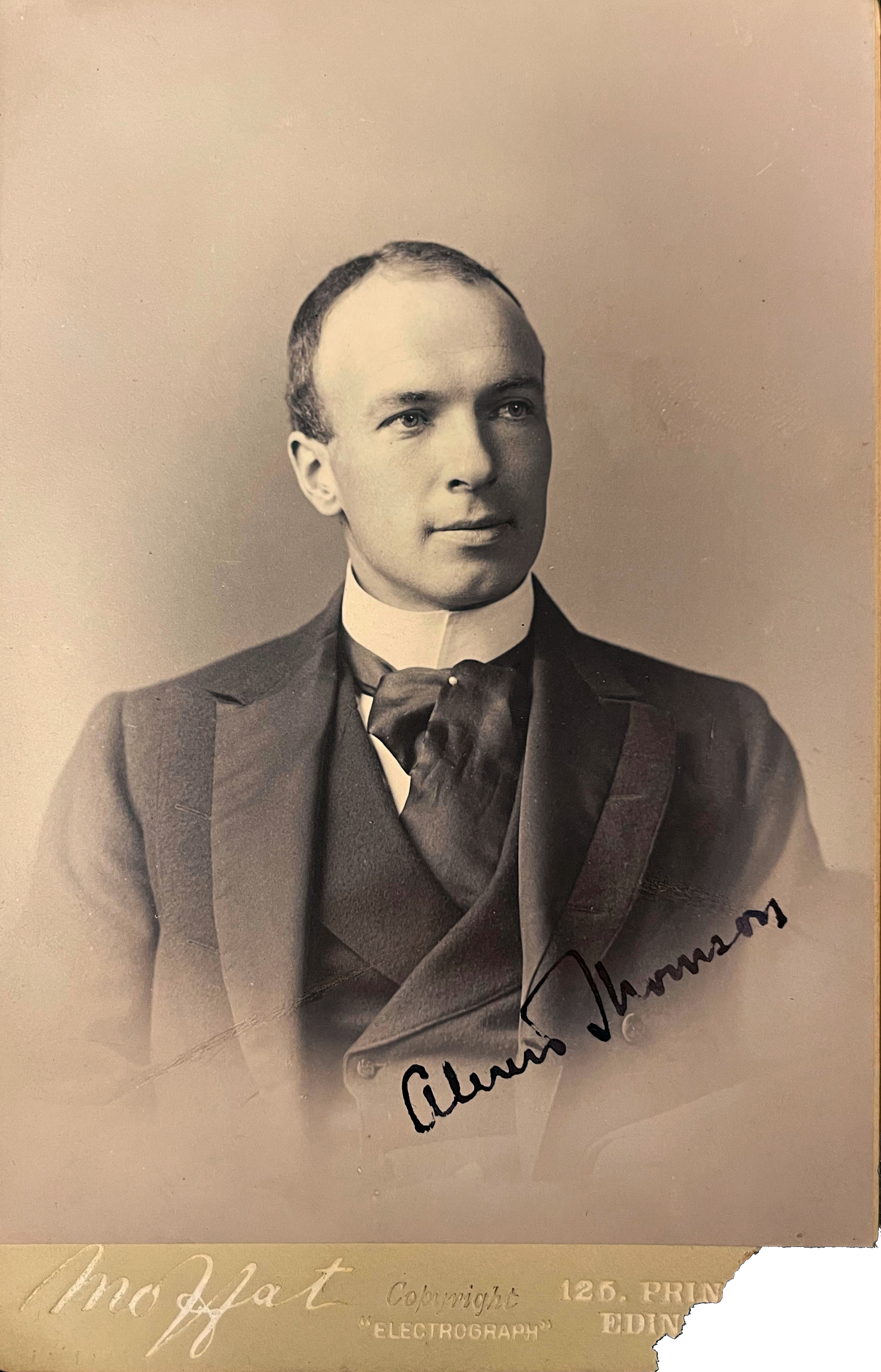
Henry Alexis Thomson, CMG, FRCS, FRCSE

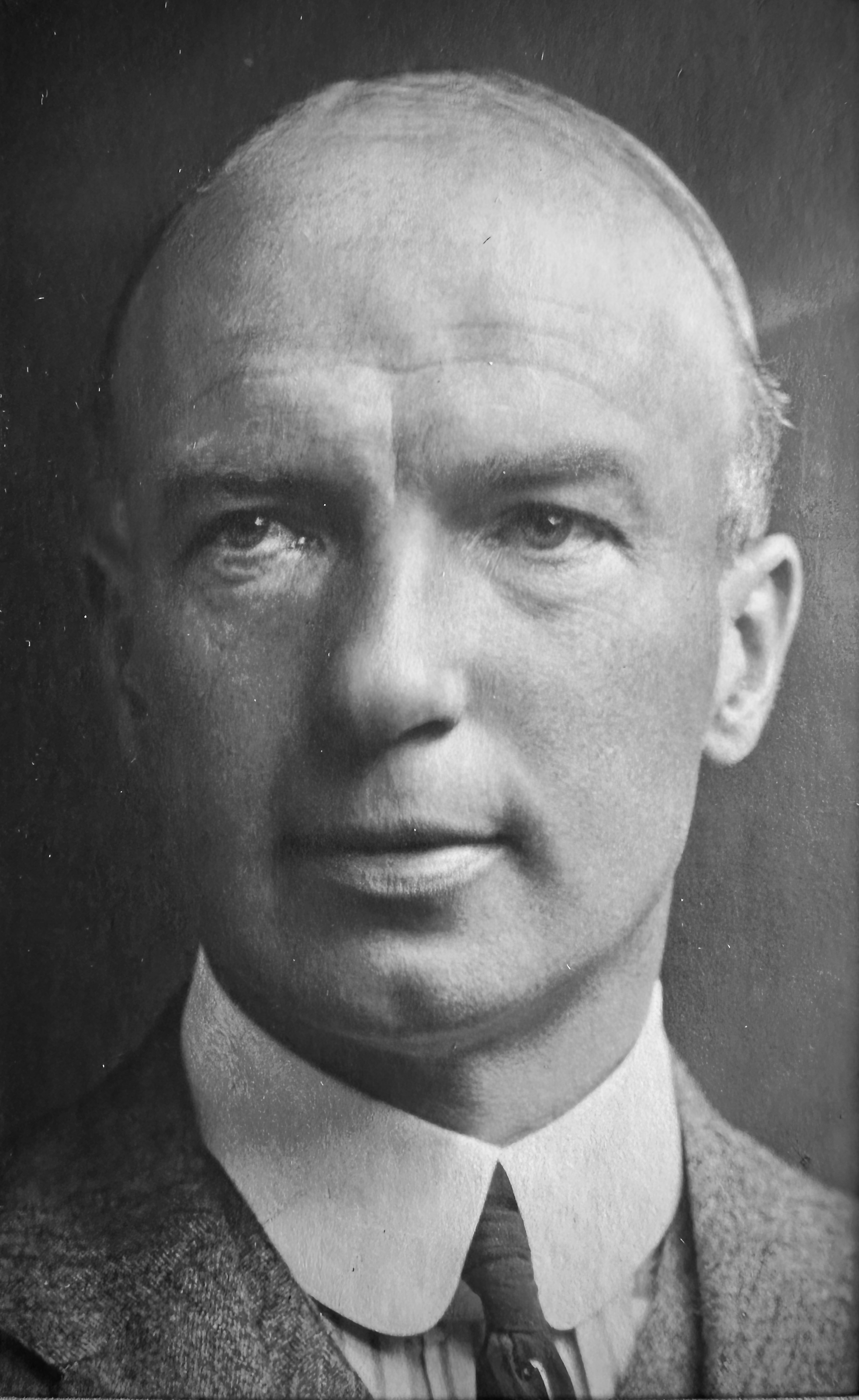
Thomson in middle age

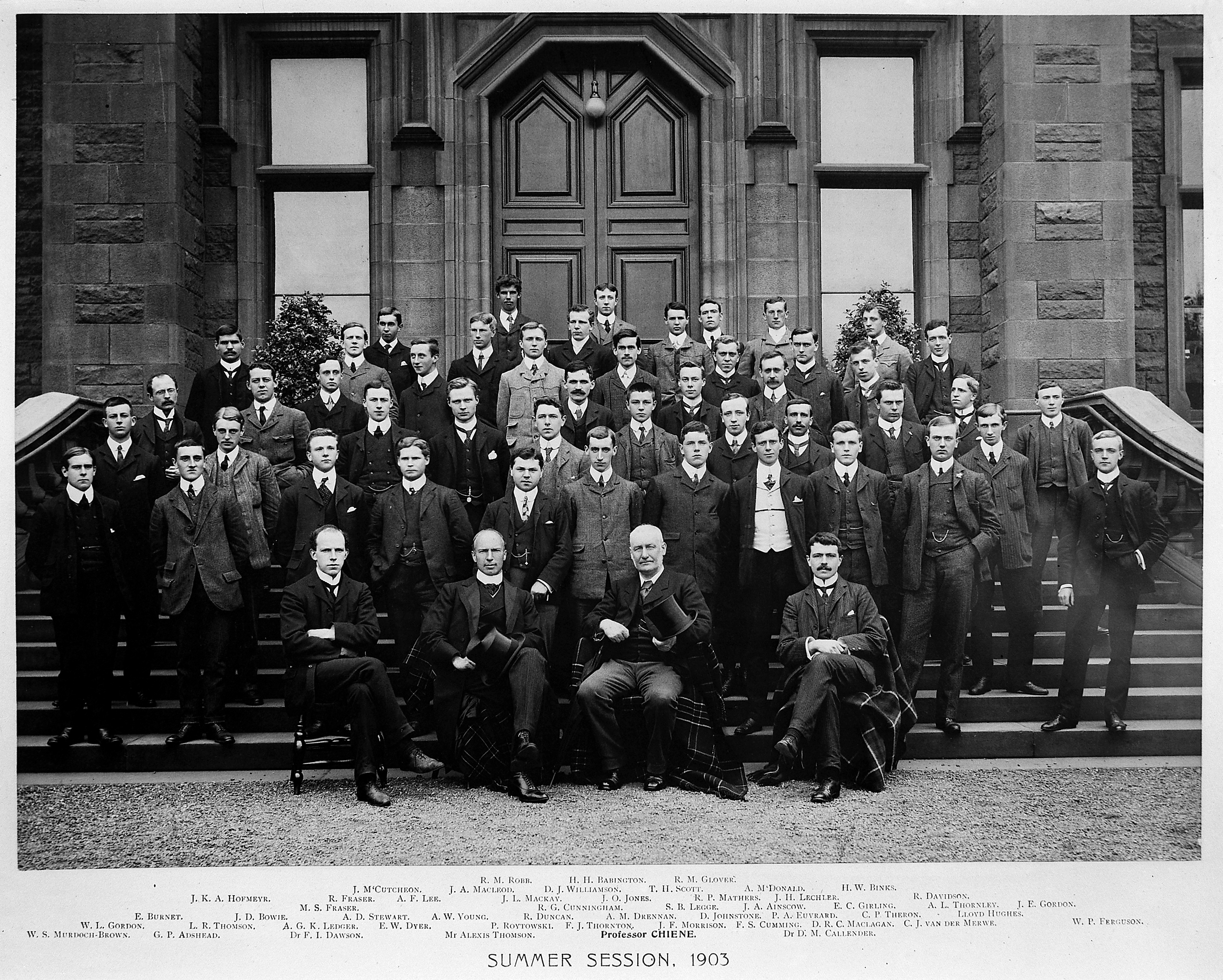
Edinburgh University Summer Session 1903. Wellcome M0017752

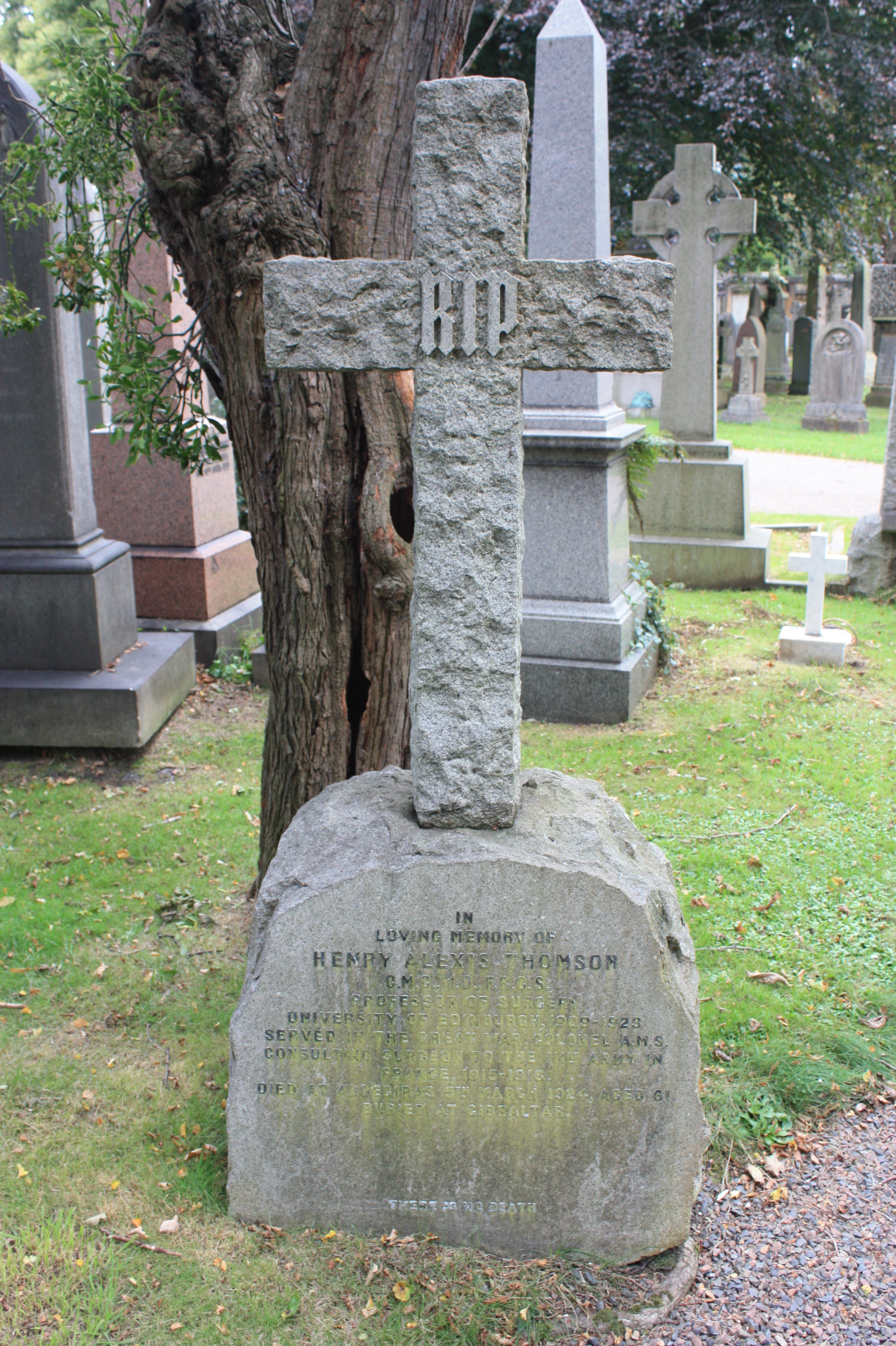
The memorial to Henry Alexis Thomson, Dean Cemetery

Henry Alexis Thomson CMG FRCS FRCSE (1863–1924) was a Scottish anatomist and medical author. He was Professor of Systematic Surgery at the University of Edinburgh from 1909 to 1923. He was an honorary member of the French Association of Surgeons and of the American Society of Clinical Surgery.

== Life ==
He was born in Edinburgh in 1863 one of seven sons to Thomas Thomson (1820–1883) an Edinburgh businessman. His father owned a silk and drapery shop at 135 Princes Street. The family lived at 5 Osborne Terrace in Edinburgh. He attended the High School in Edinburgh then, after two years studying in France and Germany, studied medicine at the University of Edinburgh. He graduated with an MB ChB with Honours in 1885. In 1888 he was elected a member of the Harveian Society of Edinburgh. In 1890 he won a gold medal for his thesis on tuberculosis of bones and joints and received his doctorate (MD). The Royal College of Surgeons of Edinburgh awarded him their Freeland-Barbour Fellowship. He initially worked at the Hospital for Sick Children in Edinburgh under Dr John Duncan.

In 1892 when he applied for the role of Surgeon at Edinburgh Royal Infirmary both Sir James Paget and Lord Lister provided testimonials in his support. In 1894 he transferred to the Deaconess Hospital in the south of the city.

In 1909 he succeeded Professor John Chiene as Professor of Systematic Surgery. In 1910 he was elected a member of the Aesculapian Club. In August 1914 he began additionally working at the 2nd Scottish General Hospital at Craigleith in west Edinburgh, operating on the wounded troops returning from the First World War. In 1915 he took leave of absence from his professorship to undertake what he saw as the more pressing issue of surgery on the western front, such as to treat the wounded as soon as possible after injury. He was given the rank of Colonel in this role. Here he worked directly with the 3rd Army of the British Expeditionary Force in northern France. He contracted trench fever and was invalided home in 1916. He never fully recovered. He was awarded a Companion of the Order of St Michael and St George (CMG) for his war work.

In later life he lived at 39 Drumsheugh Gardens in Edinburgh's West End. He ceased work due to ill-health in March 1923 and formally retired in October of the same year.

He died in Algeciras in the southern tip of Spain on 5 March 1924 and is buried in Gibraltar. His obituary in the British Medical Journal was written by his friend Sir Harold Stiles.

A monument to his memory was also erected in Dean Cemetery in western Edinburgh. It lies on the southern path, overlooking the lower southern terrace.

== Publications ==
He was joint editor of the Edinburgh Medical Journal 1902 to 1909. In addition he wrote:

- Steel Pegs in Surgery of the Bones and Joints (1899)
- On Neuroma and Neuro-Fibromatosis (1900)
- Manual of Surgery (1904) co-written with Alexander Miles
- Operative Surgery (1920)

== Family ==
He married Ethel Kate Wetherspoon of Aberdour. They had no children.
