= John Chiene =

Scottish surgeon (1843–1923)

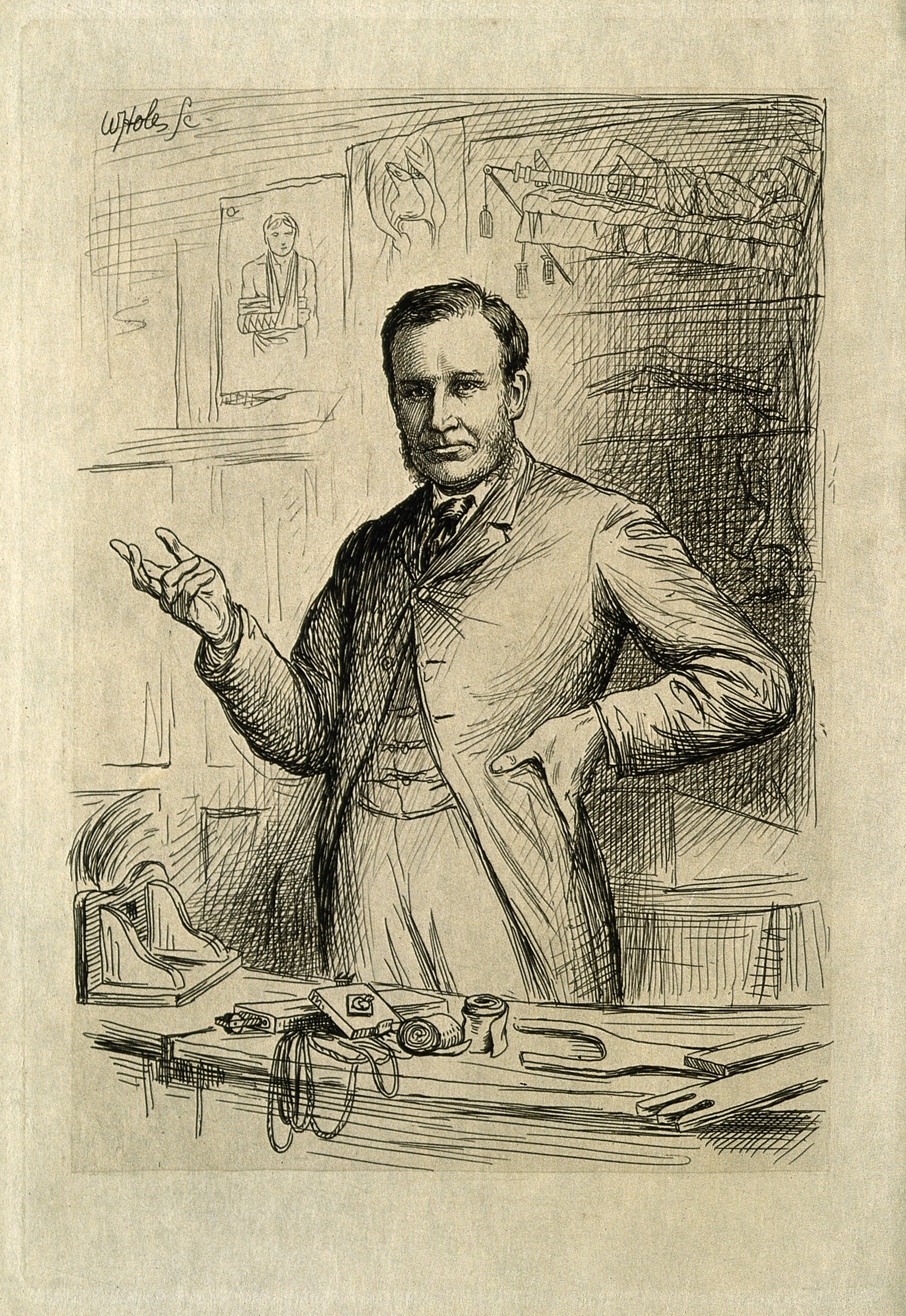

1st President of the Scottish Rugby Union
- In office 1873–1874
- Succeeded by: Albert Harvey

5th President of the Scottish Rugby Union
- In office 1877–1878
- Preceded by: William Hamilton Kidston
- Succeeded by: George Raphael Fleming

Personal details
- Born: 25 February 1843 Edinburgh, Scotland
- Died: 29 May 1923 (aged 80)

Professor John Chiene

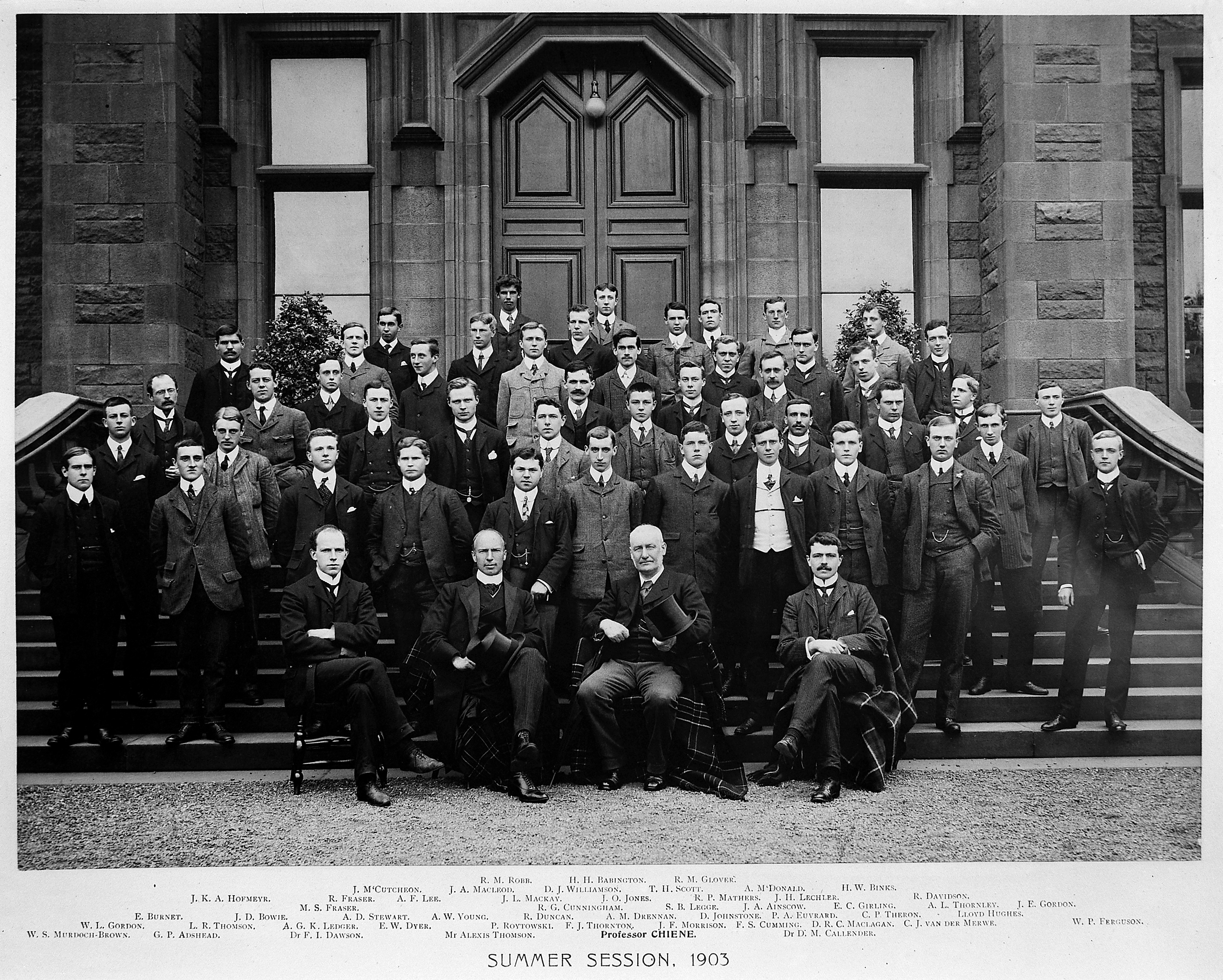
Prof Chiene (front centre) with staff and students of Edinburgh University Medical Faculty, 1903

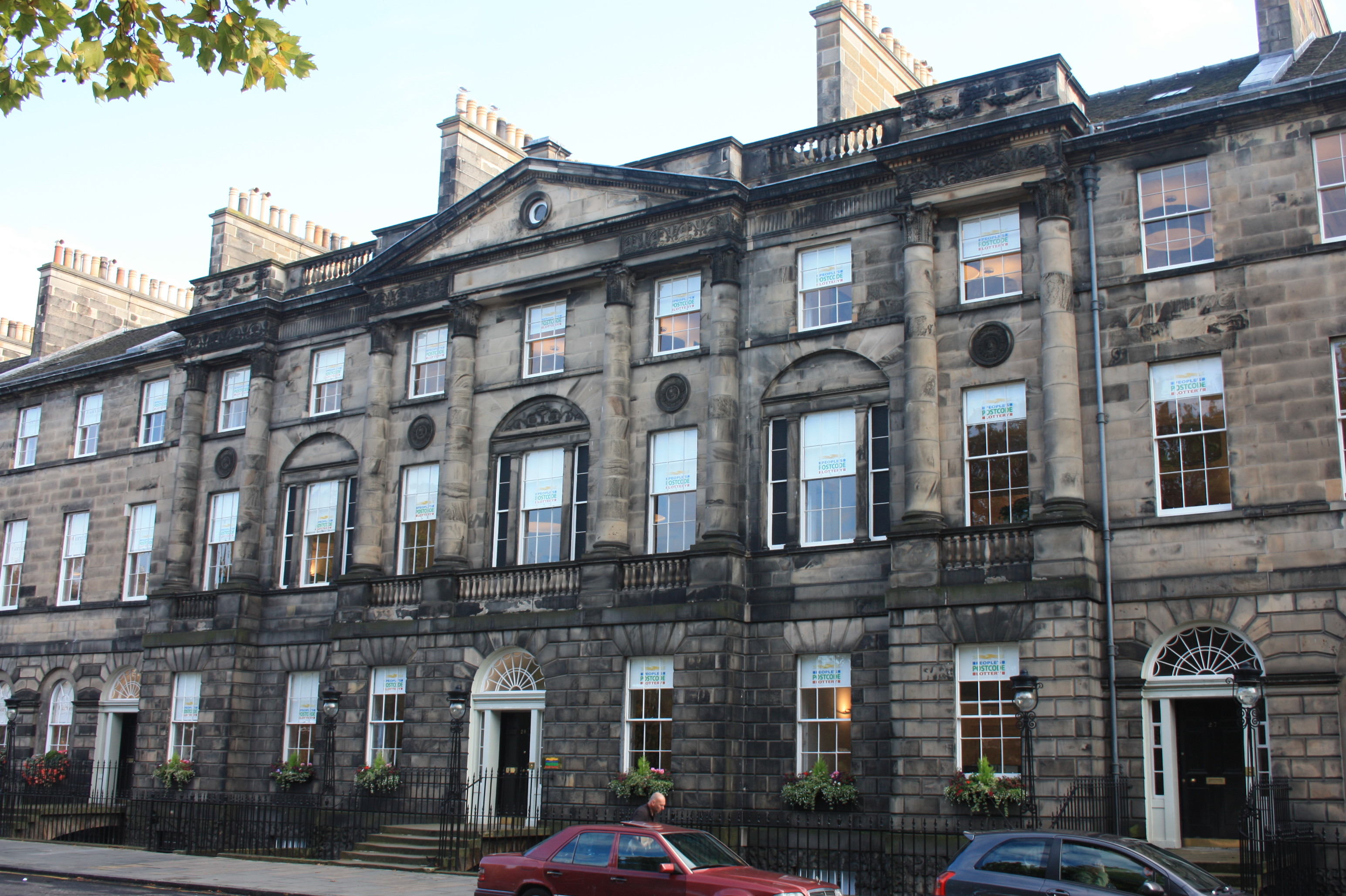
26, 27, 28 Charlotte Square, Edinburgh

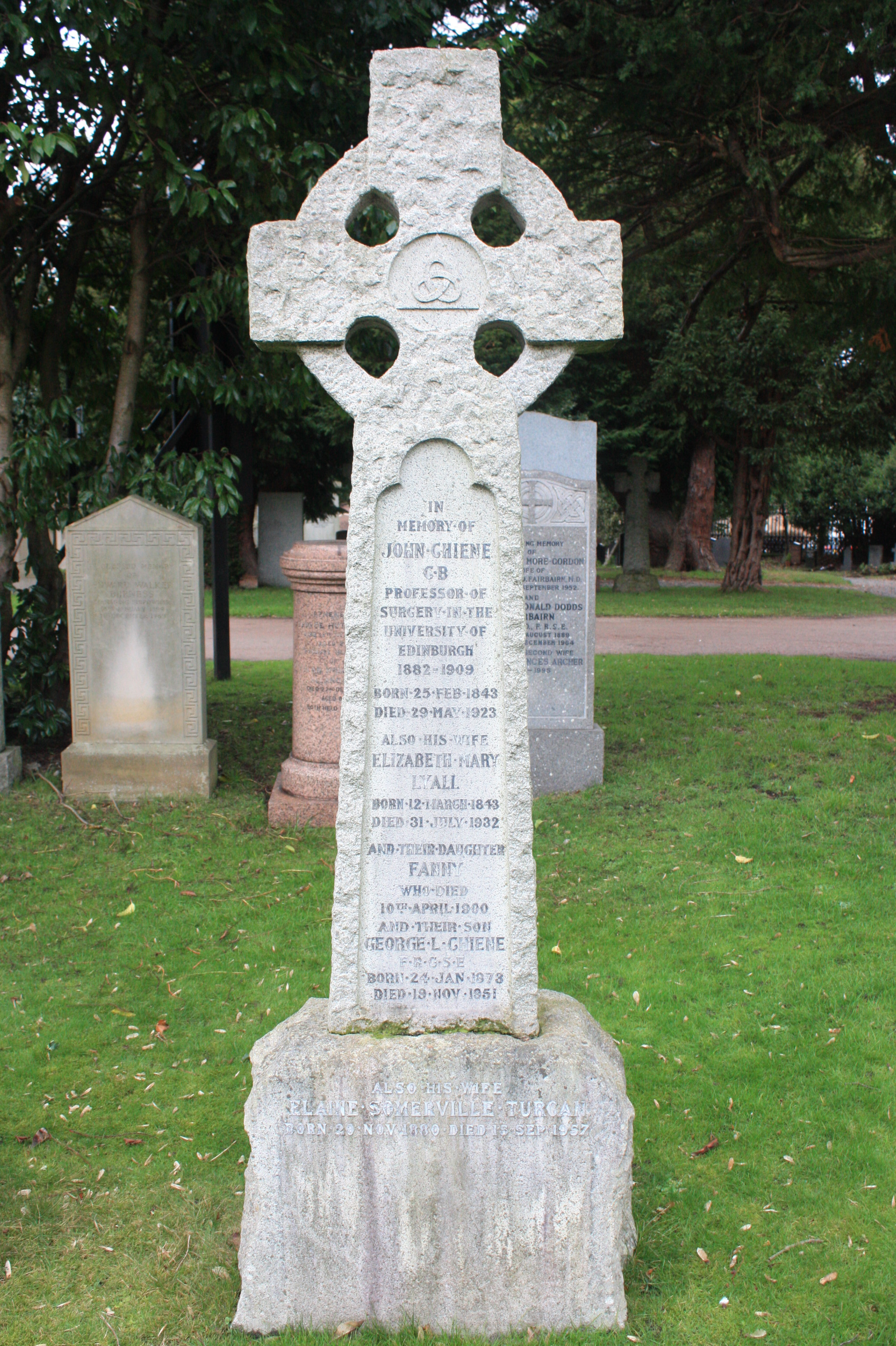
The grave of John Chiene, Dean Cemetery

John Chiene, CB, FRSE, FRCSEd (25 February 1843 – 29 May 1923) was a Scottish surgeon, who was professor of surgery at the University of Edinburgh during some of its most influential years. He was a founder of the Edinburgh Ambulance Service. The Chiene Medal is presented as an annual prize in surgery at the university. He served as president of the Royal College of Surgeons from 1897 to 1899.

== Life ==
Chiene was born at Howard Place in Edinburgh on 25 February 1843, the son of George Todd Chiene, a chartered accountant. He attended Edinburgh Academy from 1854 to 1860, gaining prizes in mathematics. While at school at the Academy he was a friend of author Robert Louis Stevenson. He then studied medicine in various prestigious centres of learning: Paris, Berlin and Vienna before qualifying MD with honours at the University of Edinburgh in 1865.

He served as house surgeon to Professor James Syme in the Royal Infirmary of Edinburgh and then worked as a demonstrator in anatomy under professor John Goodsir. In 1867 he became a Fellow of the Royal College of Surgeons of Edinburgh. He then became a lecturer in surgery at the extra-mural medical school, where he established his reputation as a teacher. At the same time he worked at the New Town Dispensary, then relocated from Thistle Street to 13 York Place. In 1871 he was appointed to the Edinburgh Royal Infirmary as an Assistant Surgeon under Professor Joseph Lister, being promoted to full Surgeon in 1878.

In 1872 Chiene was elected a member of the Harveian Society of Edinburgh and served as president in 1903. He was elected a Fellow of the Royal Society of Edinburgh in 1874, his main proposer being Sir Robert Christison. In 1892 he was elected a member of the Aesculapian Club.

From 1882 to 1909 he performed a critical and hugely influential role as Professor of Surgery at the University of Edinburgh, replacing Professor James Spence in this role. His candidature received letters of support both from Joseph Lister and Louis Pasteur. Through his teaching many major surgical advances were made which, through his many students, had a major impact around the globe. Through the 1880s his assistant was Dr Alexander Edington. On his retirement in 1909 the faculty presented him with a bronze medal. He was succeeded in the Chair of Surgery by Professor Henry Alexis Thomson.

In 1900 he is listed as living at 26 Charlotte Square, one of Edinburgh's most prestigious addresses, and the part of the central pavilion on the south side. He was elected President of the Royal College of Surgeons of Edinburgh for 1897 to 1899. His life-long friend, Sir John Halliday Croom was also his neighbour, living at 25 Charlotte Square.

In the Boer War he served as Consulting Surgeon to the Field Forces in South Africa. At this time the government then paid him the huge sum of £5000 per annum. His service was recognised by his appointment in 1902 s a Companion of the Order of the Bath (CB). He served as President of the Royal College of Surgeons from 1897 to 1899. Chiene was awarded the honorary degree of LLD by the University of Edinburgh.

Chiene retired to "Aithernie", a large villa in Davidson's Mains on the west side of Edinburgh. He died in Edinburgh on 29 May 1923. He is buried in Dean Cemetery in western Edinburgh, just south-west of the main entrance with his wife Elizabeth Mary Lyall (1843-1932), and children, Fanny (d.1900) and George L. Chiene FRCSEd (1873-1951).

== Sporting recognition ==
Chiene served as President of the Scottish Rugby Union. Also a keen golfer he was Captain of the Bruntsfield Links Golfing Society and presented the Chiene Cup, originally a trophy won by golfers linked to Edinburgh University and later broadened to any member.

== Publications ==
- Lectures on Surgical Anatomy 1878 (illustrated by Philibert Charles Berjeau)
- Looking Back

== Positions held ==
- President of the Royal Medical Society 1865
- President of the Royal College of Surgeons (Edinburgh) 1897-99
- Member of the Medico-Chirurgical Society
- President of the Harveian Society 1903.

== Notable students ==
- George Ernest Morrison
- Sir Harold Stiles

== Family ==
Chiene married Elizabeth Mary Lyall (1843-1932) in Edinburgh 1869. They had two daughters Isabella (b1871), Fanny (d1900) and two sons, George L Chiene (b 1873-1951) and Hall Campbell Chiene (b 1874).
