= Arthur Henry Havens Sinclair =

Scottish ophthalmologist (1868–1962)

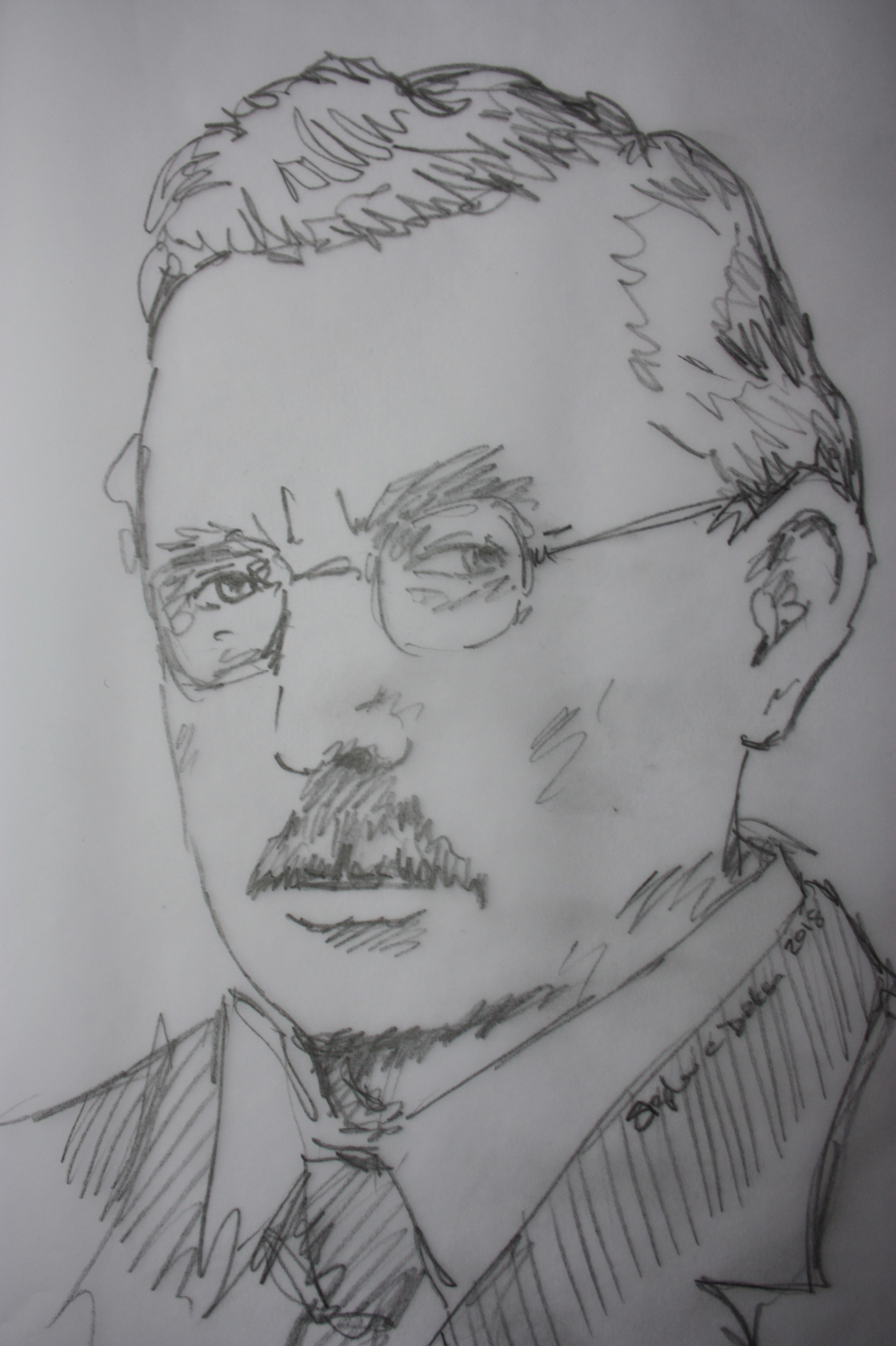
Arthur Henry Havens Sinclair

Photograph of Sinclair

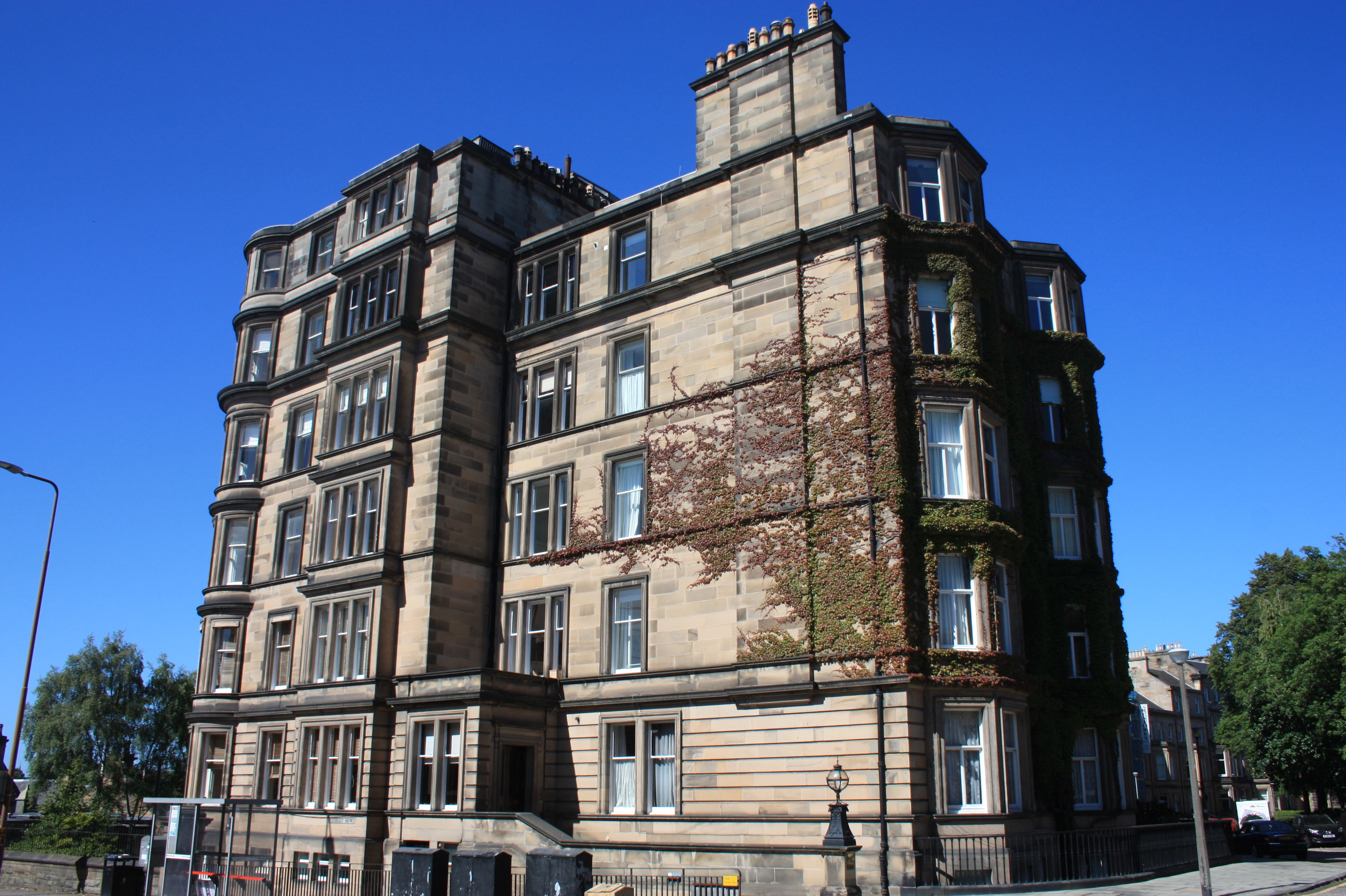
22 to 24 Rothesay Terrace, Edinburgh

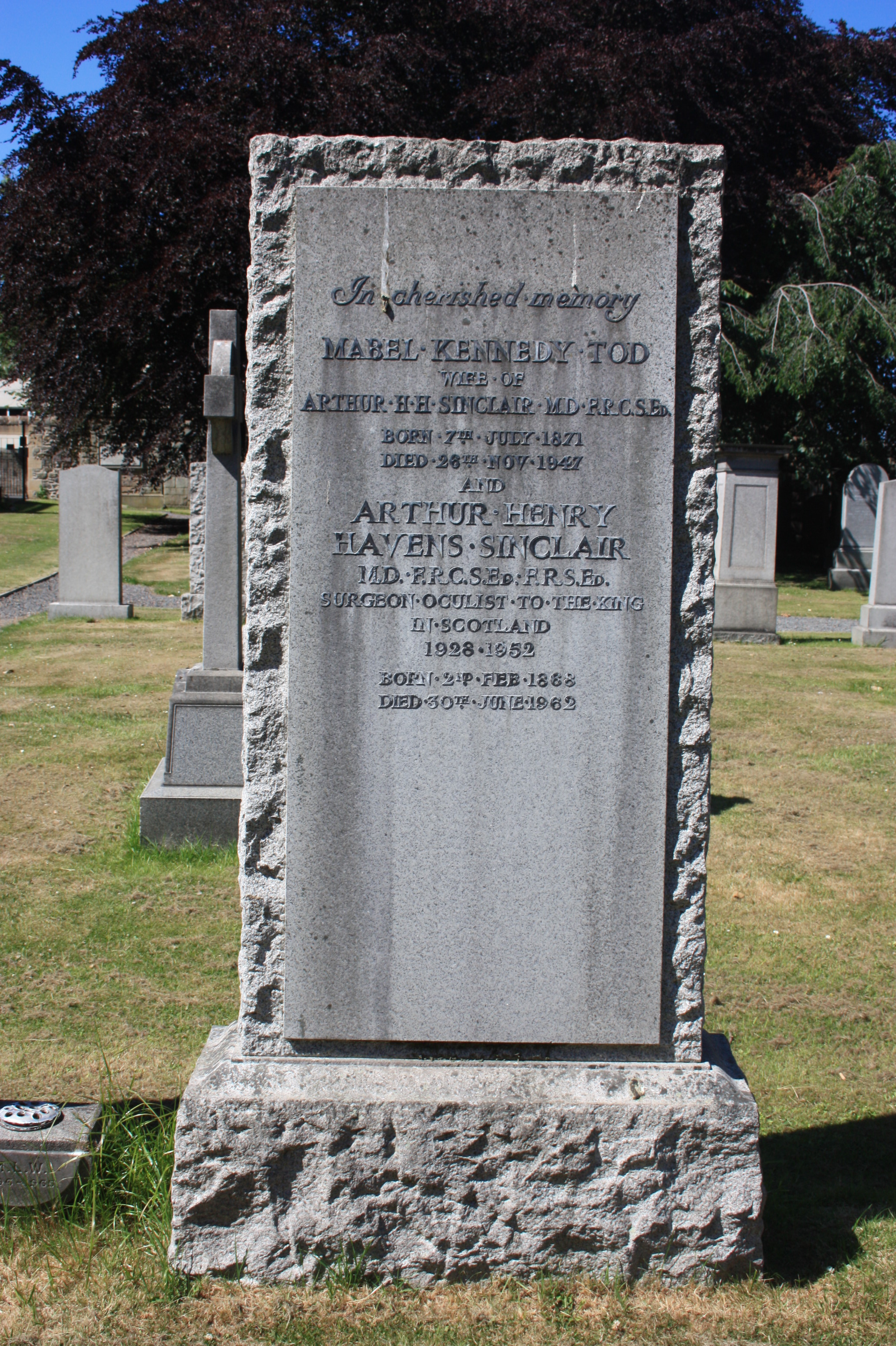
The grave of A H H Sinclair, Dean Cemetery

Arthur Henry Havens Sinclair (20 February 1868 – 30 Jun 1962) was a Scottish ophthalmologist. He was a pioneer of quantitative perimetry, introducing this technique of visual field testing to Britain. Sinclair also introduced the operation of intracapsular extraction of the lens for cataract into the UK. He was President of the Ophthalmological Society of the United Kingdom from 1931 to 1933 and was President of the Royal College of Surgeons of Edinburgh from 1933 to 1935. He was Surgeon-Oculist to King George VI in Scotland.

== Early life ==
Sinclair was born at Kenmore in Perthshire on 20 February 1868, the youngest son of Rev Alan Sinclair, minister of the Free Church of Kenmore, and his wife Sarah (née Fraser). He studied medicine at the University of Edinburgh graduating MB CM in 1893 and went on to graduate with the postgraduate degree of MD in 1899.

== Career ==
Having decided to specialise in ophthalmology at an early stage, he gained experience in that speciality by visiting clinics in London, Utrecht and Copenhagen. He became a Fellow of the Royal College of Surgeons of Edinburgh in 1899.

Also in 1899 he was appointed clinical assistant in ophthalmology at the Royal Infirmary of Edinburgh (RIE) under Sir George Berry from whom he learned the fundamentals of clinical perimetry. Berry maintained links with the ophthalmic surgeons in Copenhagen who had developed the technique and Sinclair was able to develop this further. In 1905 he was made Assistant Ophthalmic Surgeon in the RIE and Ophthalmic Surgeon to Leith Hospital and to the Royal Hospital for Sick Children in Edinburgh.

In the First World War he served in the Royal Army Medical Corps with the Salonika Expeditionary Force. From 1922 to 1932 he was Surgeon in charge of wards at the RIE.

His main contributions to ophthalmology were the introduction of quantitative perimetry, a method for measuring the visual fields. he described the use of this technique in the diagnosis of glaucoma. Sinclair introduced the operation of intracapsular extraction of the lens for cataract. His series of 257 cases published in 1932 was regarded as showing the best results published to that time.

After retiring he became chairman of the W H Ross Foundation for the Study of the Prevention of Blindness. It was on Sinclair's suggestion the fund was established. Among the advances which the Foundation made was the successful treatment of infections of the cornea in coal miners which greatly reduced the resulting blindness in that occupational group.

== Honours and awards ==
In 1927 he became President of the Ophthalmologigical Section of the British Medical Association and was elected a member of the Aesculapian Club. He was also elected a member of the Harveian Society of Edinburgh. In 1938 he was elected a Fellow of the Royal Society of Edinburgh. His proposers were Francis Albert Eley Crew, Orlando Charnock Bradley, Sir Harold Stiles, James Watt and Ralph Stockman. Sinclair was a member of the Royal Company of Archers, the Queen's Bodyguard for Scotland. He was President of the Ophthalmological Society of the United Kingdom from 1931 to 1933 and was President of the Royal College of Surgeons of Edinburgh from 1933 to 1935. He was Surgeon-Oculist to King George VI in Scotland. from 1929

== Death ==
He died at home in Edinburgh on 30 June 1962. He was buried in Dean Cemetery in western Edinburgh. The grave lies at the western end of the south-west section within the first north extension. He is also memorialised on his parents' grave in Kenmore.

== Publications ==
- The Pathology of the Idiopathic Detachment of the Retina (1901)
- The Early Diagnosis of Glaucoma
- Developmental Aphasia also known as Congenital Word-Blindness or Dyslexia (1948)

== Family ==
In 1898 he married Mabel Kennedy Tod (1871–1947). They had one son and one daughter. Prior to the First World War he lived at 5 Walker Street in Edinburgh's West End. Between the wars he lived at 22 Rothesay Terrace, a spacious two-level apartment in Edinburgh's West End. Latterly he lived in Charlotte Square, the elegant Adam-designed square in Edinburgh's New Town.
