= List of office bearers of the Harveian Society of Edinburgh and Harveian Orations =

Front page of book of records of the Harveian Society of Edinburgh

The Harveian Society of Edinburgh elects a President on an annual basis. The Society has two Secretaries who are appointed for an unlimited term of office. The following sections list the office bearers of the Society and the Harveian Orations in chronological order. Four Harveian Orations were delivered prior to formation of the Society and from 1782 to 1831 the Oration was given at irregular intervals at the Harveian Festival and generally by one of the Secretaries. Since then the Harveian Orations have generally been delivered annually by the President.

== Harveian Orations before the Society was formed ==
Year	Harveian Orator	Title of Harveian Oration
1778	Dr. Andrew Duncan	"De laudibus Gulielmi Harvei Oratio"
1779	Dr. Charles Webster	"Life and writings of the celebrated Dr. Archibald Pitcairne"
1780	Dr. Andrew Duncan	"Life and writings of the late Alex. Monro, Senr., M.D., F.R.S."
1781	Dr. Andrew Duncan	"Life, writings and character of the late Dr. Robert Whytt"

== 1780s ==
List of Office Bearers and Harveian Orations during the 1780s
Year	President	Secretary	Secretary	Title of Harveian Oration
1782	Dr. Andrew Duncan	Dr. Andrew Duncan		No oration
1783	Mr. Alexander Wood	Dr. Andrew Duncan	Dr. Charles Webster	No oration
1784	Mr. Thomas Hay	Dr. Andrew Duncan	Dr. Charles Webster	"Life, writings and character of the late Dr. David Macbride of Dublin." Orator: Dr. Andrew Duncan
1785	Dr Alexander Monro "Secundus"	Dr. Andrew Duncan	Dr. Charles Webster	"Life, writings and character of the late Sir John Pringle, Baronet." Orator: Dr. Charles Webster
1786	Mr. William Inglis	Dr. Andrew Duncan	Dr. Charles Webster	No oration
1787	Dr. Daniel Rutherford	Dr. Andrew Duncan	Dr. Charles Webster	"The life, writings and character of the late Dr. John Gregory." Orator: Dr. Charles Webster
1788	Mr. Andrew Wood	Dr. Andrew Duncan	Dr. Charles Webster	"Life, writings and character of the late Dr. John Hope, Professor of Botany in the University of Edinburgh." Orator: Dr. Andrew Duncan
1789	Dr. Nathan Spens	Dr. Andrew Duncan	Dr. Charles Webster	No oration

== 1790s ==
List of Office Bearers and Harveian Orations during the 1790s
Year	President	Secretary	Secretary	Title of Harveian Oration
1790	Mr. Forrest Dewar	Dr. Andrew Duncan	Dr. Charles Webster	No oration
1791	Dr. James Hamilton 'Senior'	Dr. Andrew Duncan	Dr. Charles Webster	No oration
1792	Mr. Benjamin Bell	Dr. Andrew Duncan	Dr. Charles Webster	No oration
1793	Dr. Francis Home	Dr. Andrew Duncan	Dr. Charles Webster	No oration
1794	Dr. Andrew Wardrop	Dr. Andrew Duncan	Dr. Charles Webster	No oration
1795	Mr. Thomas Wood	Dr. Andrew Duncan	Dr. Charles Webster	"The life, writings and character of the late John Hunter, Esq., Surgeon of London." Orator: Dr William Brown
1796	Dr. William Farquharson	Dr. Andrew Duncan	Mr. John Bell	No oration
1797	Dr. Andrew Inglis	Dr. Andrew Duncan	Mr. John Bell	No oration
1798	Dr. James Home	Dr. Andrew Duncan	Mr. John Bell	No oration
1799	Dr. William Brown	Dr. Andrew Duncan	Mr. John Bell	No oration

== 1800s ==
List of Office Bearers and Harveian Orations during the 1800s
Year	President	Secretary	Secretary	Title of Harveian Oration
1800	Dr. Thomas Charles Hope	Dr. Andrew Duncan	Mr. John Bell	No oration
1801	Mr. George Wood	Dr. Andrew Duncan	Mr. John Bell	No oration
1802	Mr. James Bryce	Dr. Andrew Duncan	Mr. John Bell	"Account of Vesalius." Orator: Dr. William Farquharson
1803	Mr. Alexander Wood*	Dr. Andrew Duncan	Mr. John Bell	No oration
1804	Mr. Andrew Wood*	Dr. Andrew Duncan	Mr. John Bell	No oration
1805	Dr. William Farquharson*	Dr. Andrew Duncan	Mr. John Bell	No oration
1806	Dr. James Home*	Dr. Andrew Duncan	Mr. John Bell	No oration
1807	Dr. John Walker	Dr. Andrew Duncan	Mr. John Bell	No oration
1808	Dr. Thomas Spens	Dr. Andrew Duncan	Mr. John Bell	No oration
1809	Mr. George Wood*	Dr. Andrew Duncan	Mr. John Bell	No oration

* Denotes that the individual was serving as President for the second time

== 1810s ==
List of Office Bearers and Harveian Orations during the 1810s
Year	President	Secretary	Secretary	Title of Harveian Oration
1810	Dr. Thomas Anderson	Dr. Andrew Duncan	Mr. John Bell	No oration
1811	Dr. Andrew Duncan "The Younger"	Dr. Andrew Duncan	Mr. John Bell	No oration
1812	Dr. Thomas Cochrane	Dr. Andrew Duncan	Mr. John Bell	No oration
1813	Dr. Charles Anderson	Dr. Andrew Duncan	Mr. John Bell	No oration
1814	Mr. Forrest Dewar*	Dr. Andrew Duncan	Mr. John Bell	No oration
1815	Dr. John Barclay	Dr. Andrew Duncan	Mr. James Bryce	No oration
1816	Dr. Thomas Charles Hope*	Dr. Andrew Duncan	Mr. James Bryce	No oration
1817	Mr. John Wishart	Dr. Andrew Duncan	Mr. James Bryce	No oration
1818	Dr. Daniel Rutherford*	Dr. Andrew Duncan	Mr. James Bryce	"Life, writings and character of Dr. Munro, Sec." Orator: Dr Andrew Duncan
1819	Dr. John Barclay*	Dr. Andrew Duncan	Mr. James Bryce	No oration

* Denotes that the individual was serving as President for the second time

== 1820s ==
List of Office Bearers and Harveian Orations during the 1820s
Year	President	Secretary	Secretary	Title of Harveian Oration
1820	Mr. Alexander Gillespie	Dr. Andrew Duncan	Mr. James Bryce	No oration
1821	Mr. William Wood	Dr. Andrew Duncan	Mr. James Bryce	"A short account of the late Sir Joseph Banks, President of the Royal Society of London." Orator: Dr Andrew Duncan
1822	Dr. James Buchan	Dr. Andrew Duncan	Mr. James Bryce	No oration
1823	Mr. William Newbigging	Dr. Andrew Duncan	Mr. James Bryce	No oration
1824	Dr. George Ballingall	Dr. Andrew Duncan	Mr. James Bryce	"Tribute of regard to the memory of Sir Henry Raeburn." Orator: Dr Andrew Duncan
1825	Dr. Robert Graham	Dr. Andrew Duncan	Mr. James Bryce	"Tribute to the memory of the late Dr. Matthew Baillie of London." Orator: Dr Andrew Duncan
1826	Dr. George Borthwick	Dr. Andrew Duncan		No oration
1827	Dr. John MacWhirter	Dr. Andrew Duncan		No oration
1828	Dr. Richard Huie	Dr. Andrew Duncan	Dr. Richard Huie	"Tribute to the memory of the late Dr. James Millar, a Member of the Society." Orator: Dr Richard Huie (read in absentia)
1829	Dr. Robert Hamilton	Dr. Richard Huie	Dr. William Moncrieff§	"Tribute of respect for the memory of the late Dr. Andrew Duncan, snr., Founder of the Society." Orator: Dr Richard Huie

§ Dr. Moncrieff was appointed physician to the New Town Dispensary, Edinburgh on 1 December 1817 and physician to the Royal Public Dispensary in January 1822. On 12 December 1823 he applied for the vacant position of physician to the Royal Infirmary of Edinburgh. In 1827, Dr. Moncrieff was Librarian of the Royal College of Physicians of Edinburgh.

== 1830s ==
List of Office Bearers and Harveian Orations during the 1830s
Year	President	Secretary	Secretary	Title of Harveian Oration
1830	Dr. George Ballingall*	Dr. Richard Huie	Dr. William Moncrieff§	"The life and professional labours of the illustrious Harvey." Orator: Dr Richard Huie
1831	Dr. John Campbell	Dr. Richard Huie	Dr. William Moncrieff	No oration
1832	Dr. Richard Huie*	Dr. Richard Huie	Dr. William Moncrieff	"Progress of medical science in the last fifty years."
1833	Dr. David Maclagan	Dr. Richard Huie	Dr. William Moncrieff	No oration
1834	Dr. William Alison	Dr. Richard Huie	Dr. William Moncrieff	"A few remarks on Medical Education."
1835	Dr. Adam Hunter	Dr. Richard Huie	Dr. Richard Poole	No oration
1836	Dr. William Moncrieff	Dr. Richard Huie	Dr. Richard Poole	"Memoir of the late Dr. James Buchan, F.R.C.P." Orator: Dr. David Maclagan
1837	Dr. Robert Christison	Dr. Richard Huie	Dr. Richard Poole	"Memoir of the late Dr. Edward Turner, Professor of Chemistry in London University."
1838	Mr. William Newbigging*	Dr. Richard Huie	Dr. Peter Handyside	"Memoir of the late Dr. James Hamilton Sen. M.D."
1839	Dr. William Beilby	Dr. Richard Huie	Dr. Peter Handyside	"Biographical notice of the late Dr. Kellie of Leith."

* Denotes that the individual was serving as President for the second time

§Dr. Moncrieff was appointed physician to the New Town Dispensary, Edinburgh on 1 December 1817 and was appointed physician to the Royal Public Dispensary in January 1822. On 12 December 1823 he applied for a vacant position of physician to the Royal Infirmary of Edinburgh. In 1827, Dr. Moncrieff was Librarian of the Royal College of Physicians of Edinburgh.

== 1840s ==
List of Office Bearers and Harveian Orations during the 1840s
Year	President	Secretary	Secretary	Title of Harveian Oration
1840	Dr. Robert Lewins	Dr. Richard Huie	Dr. Peter Handyside	"Medical Science in Austria compared with Great Britain."
1841	Dr. James Simson	Dr. Richard Huie	Dr. Peter Handyside	"Memoir of the late Dr. Duncan, jnr."
1842	Dr. Thomas Traill	Dr. Richard Huie	Dr. Peter Handyside	"Note of Servetus' claims to the discovery of the circulation of the blood, together with an account of the Finnish and Russian vapour baths."
1843	Dr. John Thatcher	Dr. Richard Huie	Dr. Peter Handyside	"Sketch of the history of Midwifery as a Science and an Art."
1844	Mr. William Brown	Dr. Richard Huie	Dr. Peter Handyside	"Sketch of the Life of his father, Dr Wm Brown, F.R.C.S."§
1845	Mr. Alexander Cockburn R.N.	Dr. Richard Huie	Dr. Peter Handyside	"Biographical sketch of the late Dr. Thomas Trotter, Physician to the British Fleet."
1846	Dr. Charles Ransford	Dr. Richard Huie	Dr. Peter Handyside	"Biographical sketch of Dr. Graham, late Professor of Botany."
1847	Dr. John Scott	Dr. Richard Huie	Dr. Peter Handyside	"Biographical memoir of Laennec."
1848	Dr. James Young Simpson	Dr. Richard Huie	Dr. Peter Handyside	"Sketch of the good old times of the medical profession in Scotland."
1849	Dr. Samuel Pagan	Dr. Richard Huie	Dr. Peter Handyside	"Notes of a case - tic douloureux - by John Locke, with an account of his medical studies and practice." Orator: Dr. John Brown

§ Dr. William Brown Senior was President of the Society in 1799 and a booklet on his life, which presumably formed the basis of this oration, was published originally in 1819 and reprinted in 1854.

== 1850s ==
List of Office Bearers and Harveian Orations during the 1850s
Year	President	Secretary	Secretary	Title of Harveian Oration
1850	Dr. John Smith	Dr. Robert Omond	Dr. John Hughes Bennett	"Account of Scotch Asylums."
1851	Dr. Richard Smith	Dr. Robert Omond	Dr. John Hughes Bennett	"Progress of cholera during the last epidemic at Lasswade and Loanhead."
1852	Prof. John Balfour	Dr. Robert Omond	Dr. John Hughes Bennett	"History and progress of the Botanic Garden of Edinburgh."
1853	Dr. William Seller	Dr. Robert Omond	Dr. John Hughes Bennett	"History, in a medical point of view, of the year 1654, the year in which Harvey, towards the close of his life, was elected President of the London College of Physicians."
1854	Dr. Douglas Maclagan	Dr. Robert Omond	Dr. John Hughes Bennett	"Life, character and writings of the late Dr. Abercrombie of Edinburgh."
1855	Mr. James Craig	Dr. Robert Omond	Dr. John Hughes Bennett	"Judicial investigations in criminal cases."
1856	Dr. Robert Malcolm	Dr. Robert Omond	Dr. John Hughes Bennett	"Rise and progress of the Edinburgh School of Midwifery."
1857	Dr.Archibald Inglis	Dr. Robert Omond	Dr. John Hughes Bennett	"The difficulty of estimating the therapeutical value of medicinal agents."
1858	Mr. Henry Sanderson	Dr. Robert Omond	Dr. John Hughes Bennett	"Changes in medical opinions."
1859	Dr. John Hughes Bennett	Dr. Robert Omond	Dr. William Seller	"Recent medical changes, especially in the Department of Physiology."

== 1860s ==
Letter of cancellation of the Harveian Festival of 1864

List of Office Bearers and Harveian Orations during the 1860s
Year	President	Secretary	Secretary	Title of Harveian Oration
1860	Professor James Miller	Dr. Robert Omond	Dr. William Seller	"Appreciation of the character of Harvey."
1861	Dr. Charles Bell	Dr. Robert Omond	Dr. William Seller	"Obstetrics, commencing with the time of Harvey."
1862	Dr. John Lucas	Dr. Robert Omond	Dr. William Seller	"On the natural history of progress."
1863	Dr. William Dumbreck	Dr. Robert Omond	Dr. William Seller	"Respiration and circulation in the lower animals."
1864	Dr. John Coldstream	Dr. Robert Omond	Dr. William Seller	No Harveian Festival and no oration§
1865	Dr. John M. Strachan	Dr. Robert Omond	Dr. William Seller	"Origin of the vital forces."
1866	Dr. Andrew Halliday Douglas	Dr. Robert Omond	Dr. William Seller	"The late Prof. Alison."
1867	Mr. Benjamin Bell	Dr. Robert Omond	Dr. William Seller	"Biographical sketch of the late Mr. Hey of Leeds."
1868	Dr. Alexander Wood	Dr. Robert Omond	Dr. William Seller	"Preliminary medical education."
1869	Dr. James Dunsmure	Dr. Robert Omond	Dr. William Seller	"Biographical memoir of the late Sir George Ballingall."

§ The Harveian Festival of 1864 was cancelled following the death of the Society's President Dr. John Coldstream.

== 1870s ==
List of Office Bearers and Harveian Orations during the 1870s
Year	President	Secretary	Secretary	Title of Harveian Oration
1870	Prof. William Gairdner	Dr. Robert Omond	Dr. James Gillespie	"Olla Podridas."
1871	Prof. James Spence	Dr. Robert Omond	Dr. James Gillespie	"Biographical notice of Dr. Bell, Surgeon, of Edinburgh."
1872	Dr. Matthew Turnbull	Dr. James Gillespie	Professor William Sanders	"Celebrated Border surgeons."
1873	Dr. Robert Paterson	Dr. James Gillespie	Professor William Sanders	"Life of the late Prof. Syme."
1874	Dr. Robert Omond	Dr. James Gillespie	Professor William Sanders	"Early history of the Society."
1875	Dr. William S. Irvine	Dr. James Gillespie	Professor William Sanders	"Medical notes about Shakespere and his time." Orator: Dr. James Gillespie^{a}
1876	Dr. James Matthews Duncan	Dr. James Gillespie	Professor William Sanders	"Life and writings of William Hunter."
1877	Prof. Alexander Harvey	Dr. James Gillespie	Professor William Sanders	"William Pulteney Anderson."
1878	Professor William Turner in absentia	Dr. James Gillespie	Professor William Sanders	"William Harvey." Orator: Professor William Sanders^{b}
1879	Dr. Henry Scott Anderson in absentia	Dr. James Gillespie	Professor William Sanders	"Reminiscences of forty-five years of country practice."^{c}

^{a}According to Dr MacGillivray in his oration of 1912, Dr Irvine of Pitlochry "presided over the dinner enjoyed the feast, but absolutely refused to give an oration...Dr Gillespie one of the Secretaries was obliged to take Dr Irvine's place and at short notice to deliver the oration."

^{b}Professor William Sanders was also in the Chair.

^{c}Dr. Rutherford Haldane took the chair and Dr. Anderson's oration was read by Dr. James Gillespie.

== 1880s ==
List of Office Bearers and Harveian Orations during the 1880s
Year	President	Secretary	Secretary	Title of Harveian Oration
1880	Dr. Daniel Rutherford Haldane	Dr. James Gillespie	Professor William Sanders	"Progress of medicine during the last thirty years."
1881	Dr. Henry D. Littlejohn	Dr. James Gillespie	Professor William Sanders	"Sanitary progress."
1882	Prof. Douglas Maclagan*	Dr. James Gillespie	Dr. Alexander Crum Brown	Centenary: no oration
1883	Dr. John Connel	Dr. James Gillespie	Dr. Alexander Crum Brown	"Professional progress."
1884	Dr. Alexander Keiller	Dr. James Gillespie	Dr. Alexander Crum Brown	"Reminiscences of the medical profession in Edinburgh fifty years ago."§
1885	Dr. Patrick Heron Watson	Dr. James Gillespie	Dr. Alexander Crum Brown	No oration
1886	Dr John Aymers MacDougall	Dr. James Gillespie	Dr. Alexander Crum Brown	"The life work of Prof. James Spence."
1887	Dr. George Balfour	Dr. James Gillespie	Dr. Alexander Crum Brown	"Recent progress in the diagnosis, prognosis and treatment of cardiac disease."
1888	Dr. John Smith	Dr. James Gillespie	Dr. Alexander Crum Brown	"The days of Harvey."
1889	Prof. James Bell Pettigrew	Dr. James Gillespie	Dr. Alexander Crum Brown	"The pioneers in medicine prior to Harvey."

* Serving as President for the second time

§ This Festival occurred during the tercentenary week of the University of Edinburgh and was held at the Royal College of Physicians of Edinburgh.

== 1890s ==
List of Office Bearers and Harveian Orations during the 1890s
Year	President	Secretary	Secretary	Title of Harveian Oration
1890	Dr. Alexander Peddie	Dr. James Gillespie	Dr. Alexander Crum Brown	"Mr. Syme, Dr.John Brown and Minto House."
1891	Dr. James Gillespie in absentia	Dr. James Gillespie	Dr. Alexander Crum Brown	No oration
1892	Dr. John Strachan, Jnr.	Dr. James Gillespie	Dr. Alexander Crum Brown	"The blood is the life."
1893	Prof. Thomas Grainger Stewart	Dr. Alexander Crum Brown	Dr. Francis Cadell§	"Illnesses of celebrated people in former times."
1894	Prof. John Struthers	Dr. Alexander Crum Brown	Dr. Francis Cadell	"Harvey and his work."
1895	Dr. David Yellowlees	Dr. Alexander Crum Brown	Dr. Francis Cadell	"Effect on the treatment of the sane of the example of Tuke of York and Fox of Brislington."
1896	Dr. Robert Peel Ritchie	Dr. Alexander Crum Brown	Dr. Francis Cadell	"Days and knights of the Harveian."
1897	Dr. Joseph Bell	Dr. Alexander Crum Brown	Dr. Francis Cadell	"Some Harveian Gleanings."
1898	Dr. Alexander Ballantyne	Dr. Alexander Crum Brown	Dr. Francis Cadell	"Harvey and embryology."
1899	Dr. Alexander Crum Brown	Dr. Alexander Crum Brown	Dr. Francis Cadell	"Dr. John Mayow."

§ Cadell was a surgeon and father of the Scottish Colourist Francis Cadell.

== 1900s ==
List of Office Bearers and Harveian Orations during the 1900s
Year	President	Secretary	Secretary	Title of Harveian Oration
1900	Prof. Thomas Annandale	Dr. Alexander Crum Brown	Dr. Francis Cadell^{a}	"Transfusion."
1901	Dr. Robert Farquharson	Dr. Alexander Crum Brown	Dr. Francis Cadell	"Harvey and modern progress."
1902	Dr. J.J. Kirk Duncanson	Dr. Alexander Crum Brown	Dr. Francis Cadell	"Harvey: his life and times."
1903	Prof. John Chiene	Dr. Alexander Crum Brown	Dr. Francis Cadell	"The early days of the Edinburgh Royal Infirmary."^{b}
1904	Dr. Robert Somerville	Dr.Francis Boyd	Mr. John Dowden	"Recollections of the Edinburgh School of 1855."
1905	Dr. Charles Underhill	Dr.Francis Boyd	Mr. John Dowden	"The writings of Harvey."^{c}
1906	Sir John Halliday Croom	Dr.Francis Boyd	Mr. John Dowden	"The times of Harvey."
1907	Dr. William Barrie Dow	Dr.Francis Boyd	Mr. John Dowden	"The relationship between Syphilis and Tuberculosis (unpublished)."
1908	Sir Thomas Clouston	Dr.Francis Boyd	Mr. John Dowden	"Blood and mind."
1909	Dr. William A. Finlay in absentia^{d}	Dr.Francis Boyd	Mr. John Dowden	No oration

^{a}Cadell was a surgeon and father of the Scottish Colourist Francis Cadell.

^{b}Chiene published an article on this topic in 1902.

^{c}The article cited here is to toast to the Immortal Memory of Harvey proposed by Underhill during the Festival, rather than the oration itself.

^{d}Dr Finlay was prevented by illness from attending the Festival and Sir Thomas Clouston took the chair.

== 1910s ==
List of Office Bearers and Harveian Orations during the 1910s
Year	President	Secretary	Secretary	Title of Harveian Oration
1910	Dr. John Strachan, Jnr.*	Dr. Francis Boyd	Mr. John Dowden	"Cell life and the life cell in animal physiology."
1911	Sir Alexander Simpson	Dr. Francis Boyd	Mr. John Dowden	"Life and its epiphanies."
1912	Dr. Charles Watson MacGillivray	Dr. Francis Boyd	Mr. John Dowden	"Some memories of old Harveians."
1913	Sir George Beatson	Dr. Francis Boyd	Mr. John Dowden	"The blood and its secrets."
1914	Sir Thomas Richard Fraser	Dr. Francis Boyd	Mr. John Dowden	"The circulation of the blood in Harvey's time and now."
1915		Dr. Francis Boyd	Mr. John Dowden	No Harveian Festival and no oration§
1916		Dr. Francis Boyd	Mr. John Dowden	No Harveian Festival and no oration§
1917		Dr. Francis Boyd	Mr. John Dowden	No Harveian Festival and no oration§
1918		Dr. Francis Boyd	Mr. John Dowden	No Harveian Festival and no oration§
1919	Mr. Francis Caird	Dr. Francis Boyd	Mr. John Dowden	"Reminiscences of old Harveians."

* Dr Strachan served as President for the second time.

§ The annual Harveian Festival was not held due to World War I.

== 1920s ==
List of Office Bearers and Harveian Orations during the 1920s
Year	President	Secretaries		Title of Harveian Oration
1920	Dr. Charles Douglas	Dr. Francis Boyd	Mr. John Dowden	"Two medical humorists."
1921	Dr. Alexander James	Dr. Francis Boyd	Mr. John Dowden	"Harvey's Sociology."
1922		Dr. Francis Boyd	Mr. John Dowden	No Harveian Festival and no oration§
1923	Sir T. Kennedy Dalziel	Mr. John Dowden	Dr. David Halliday Croom	No oration
1924	Sir David Wallace	Mr. John Dowden	Dr. David Halliday Croom	"Then and now."
1925	Dr. Peter McBride	Mr. John Dowden	Dr. David Halliday Croom	"Why did Harvey discover the circulation?"
1926	Sir Robert Philip	Mr. John Dowden	Dr. David Halliday Croom	"Harveiana Edinburgensia."
1927	Dr. David Huskie	Mr. John Dowden	Dr. David Halliday Croom	"Harvey: his message."
1928	Dr. Robert Thin	Mr. John Dowden	Dr. Herbert Watson Wemyss	"Dr. Archibald Pitcairne."
1929	Dr. Lewis Bruce	Mr. John Dowden	Dr. Herbert Watson Wemyss	"Life and customs in the time of Wm Harvey."

§The reason why the Festival of 1922 was not held is unknown as there are no minutes for this period in the Society's archives.

== 1930s ==
List of Office Bearers and Harveian Orations during the 1930s
Year	President	Secretary	Secretary	Title of Harveian Oration
1930	Prof. George Lovell Gulland	Mr. John Dowden	Dr. Herbert Watson Wemyss	"The circulating fluid."
1931	Dr. D. Elliot Dickson	Mr. John Dowden	Dr. Herbert Watson Wemyss	"Humility in Medicine."
1932	Dr. James Haig Ferguson	Mr. John Dowden	Dr. Herbert Watson Wemyss	"Some medical heroes of the seventeenth, eighteenth and nineteenth centuries."
1933	Dr. Samuel Davidson§	Mr. John Dowden		"Hope in medicine."
1934	Prof. Edwin Bramwell	Dr. Derrick Dunlop	Mr. Donald Middleton	"Sir Charles Bell his life and work."
1935	Dr. Allan Tuke	Dr. Derrick Dunlop	Mr. Donald Middleton	"Harvey - the General Practitioner."
1936	Mr. William James Stuart	Dr. Derrick Dunlop	Mr. Donald Middleton	"Harvey and integration."
1937	Dr. Henry Yellowlees	Prof. Derrick Dunlop	Mr. Donald Middleton	"Harvey and the human heart."
1938	Mr. Henry Wade	Prof. Derrick Dunlop	Mr. Donald Middleton	"Harvey in Scotland."
1939	Dr. Henry Robarts§§	Prof. Derrick Dunlop	Mr. Donald Middleton	"If Health be Wanting."

§ Dr Davidson was a country practitioner in Kelso.

§§ Dr Robarts was a country practitioner in Haddington.

== 1940s ==
List of Office Bearers and Harveian Orations during the 1940s
Year	President	Secretary	Secretary	Title of Harveian Oration
1940		Prof. Derrick Dunlop	Mr. Donald Middleton	No Harveian Festival and no oration§
1941		Prof. Derrick Dunlop	Mr. Donald Middleton	No Harveian Festival and no oration§
1942		Prof. Derrick Dunlop	Mr. Donald Middleton§§	No Harveian Festival and no oration§
1943		Prof. Derrick Dunlop		No Harveian Festival and no oration§
1944		Prof. Derrick Dunlop		No Harveian Festival and no oration§
1945		Prof. Derrick Dunlop		No Harveian Festival and no oration§
1946		Prof. Derrick Dunlop		No Harveian Festival and no oration§
1947		Prof. Derrick Dunlop		No Harveian Festival and no oration§
1948	Prof. Robert Johnstone	Prof. Derrick Dunlop		"William Harvey - The Father of British Midwifery."
1949	Dr. Alexander Greig Anderson	Prof. Derrick Dunlop		"The Background of Medicine."

§ The annual Harveian Festival was not held due to World War II and its aftermath.

§§ Mr Middleton was killed on active service in October 1942.

== 1950s ==
List of Office Bearers and Harveian Orations during the 1950s
Year	President	Secretary	Secretary	Title of Harveian Oration
1950	Prof. Charles McNeil	Prof. Derrick Dunlop	Mr. John Bruce	"Verities yet in their Chaos."
1951	Prof. James Young	Prof. Derrick Dunlop	Mr. John Bruce	"William Harvey and the Scholastic Tradition."
1952	Mr. James Graham	Prof. Derrick Dunlop	Mr. John Bruce	"William Harvey and the Early Days of Blood Transfusion."
1953	Dr W.D. Chambers	Prof. Derrick Dunlop	Mr. John Bruce	"The place of Harvey in the Advance of Science."
1954	Dr. William Alister Alexander	Prof. Derrick Dunlop	Mr. John Bruce	"Reflections of the Failure to Discover the Circulation in the Sixteenth Century."
1955	Prof. Melville Arnott	Prof. Derrick Dunlop	Mr. John Bruce	"The Climate of Discovery."
1956	Dr. Douglas Guthrie	Prof. Derrick Dunlop	Prof. John Bruce	"Harvey in Space and Time."
1957	Prof. Derrick Dunlop	Prof. John Bruce	Dr. James Innes	"Three Hundred Years Ago."
1958	Prof. Ian Aird	Prof. John Bruce	Dr. James Innes	"The Biological Value to Man of the Human Blood groups."
1959	Sir Walter Mercer	Prof. John Bruce	Dr. James Innes	"Made Possible by Harvey."

== 1960s ==
List of Office Bearers and Harveian Orations during the 1960s
Year	President	Secretary	Secretary	Title of Harveian Oration
1960	Prof. Ian Hill	Prof. John Bruce	Dr. James Innes	"The Legacy of Harvey."
1961	Dr. James Slater	Prof. John Bruce	Dr. James Innes	"Harvey as seen by our generation."
1962	Dr. James Bruce Dewar	Prof. John Bruce	Dr. James Innes	"The Imprisoned Splendour."
1963	Dr. Andrew Rae Gilchrist	Prof. John Bruce	Dr. James Innes	"Harvey, the Compleat Physician."
1964	Prof. Robert Walmsley	Prof. John Bruce	Dr. James Innes	"The Harveian Method."
1965	Dr. Ion Simson Hall	Prof. John Bruce	Dr. James Innes	"William Harvey: Physician. Tis the mind that makes the body rich. The Taming of the Shrew Act 4, Scene 3."
1966	Dr. Joseph Houston Wright	Prof. John Bruce	Dr. James Innes	"Wise Men from the West."
1967	Sir John Bruce	Dr. James Innes	Mr. Noel Gray§	"The bridge builders."
1968	Dr. Christopher Clayson	Dr. James Innes	Mr. Noel Gray§	"Physitians Abounding in Phantasie."
1969	Mr. James Cameron	Dr. James Innes	Mr. Iain MacLaren	"William Harvey, Dr of Physique and Chirurgerie - A Man for All Seasons."

§ Mr Gray was a Consultant in General Surgery at Bangour General Hospital, Broxburn, Scotland.

== 1970s ==
List of Office Bearers and Harveian Orations during the 1970s
Year	President	Secretary	Secretary	Title of Harveian Oration
1970	Sir Hector MacLennan	Dr. James Innes	Mr. Iain MacLaren	"William Harvey - The Pacemaker."
1971	Prof. Kenneth Donald	Dr. James Innes	Mr. Iain MacLaren	"Harvey, then and now."
1972	Prof. Thomas Anderson	Dr. James Innes	Mr. Iain MacLaren	"Management in Medicine."
1973	Dr. Richard Turner	Dr. James Innes	Mr. Iain MacLaren	"Harveian Exercise and the Heart."
1974	Sir Donald Douglas	Dr. James Innes	Mr. Iain MacLaren	"The Student University of Padua."
1975	Prof. George Montgomery	Dr. James Innes	Mr. Iain MacLaren	"The grand anatomies of Harvey's time."
1976	Prof. James Hutchison	Dr. James Innes	Mr. Iain MacLaren	"Scottish Children and their Doctors."
1977	Prof. John Crofton	Dr. James Innes	Mr. Iain MacLaren	"Creativity."
1978	Mr. James Ross	Dr. James Innes	Mr. Iain MacLaren	"The Reception of New Ideas and Discoveries."
1979	Prof. Edward McGirr	Dr. James Innes	Mr. Iain MacLaren	"From Dogma to Science?"

== 1980s ==
List of Office Bearers and Harveian Orations during the 1980s
Year	President	Secretary	Secretary	Title of Harveian Oration
1980	Prof. Francis Gillingham	Dr. James Innes	Mr. Iain MacLaren	"William Harvey was a European."
1981	Prof. William Walker	Dr. James Innes	Mr. Iain MacLaren	"Harvey's Contemporaries - Science and Society."
1982	Dr. James Innes	Mr. Iain MacLaren	Dr. Anthony Toft	Bicentenary Oration: "The Harveians of Edinburgh - their First 200 Years."
1983	Prof. Ross Mitchell	Mr. Iain MacLaren	Dr. Anthony Toft	"William Harvey and Celtic Medicine."
1984	Prof. Patrick Forrest	Mr. Iain MacLaren	Dr. Anthony Toft	"Harvey: 1628 and 1984."
1985	Prof. Arthur Kennedy	Mr. Iain MacLaren	Dr. Anthony Toft	"The Basis of Discovery."
1986	Dr. Ronald Robertson	Mr. Iain MacLaren§	Dr. Anthony Toft§	"The Humours of Harvey."
1987	Dr. Donald Emslie-Smith	Mr. Iain MacLaren	Dr. Anthony Toft	"Great Doctors and Medical Worthies."
1988	Mr. Iain MacLaren	Dr. Anthony Toft	Mr. Alasdair MacGregor	"Doctors Extraordinary and In Ordinary."
1989	Dr. Ronald McNeill	Dr. Anthony Toft	Mr. Alasdair MacGregor	"Harvey and the Pulmonary Circulation."

§ The titles "Surgical Secretary" and "Medical Secretary" were first used in 1986 to describe, respectively, Mr. MacLaren and Dr. Toft.

== 1990s ==
List of Office Bearers and Harveian Orations during the 1990s
Year	President	Medical Secretary	Surgical Secretary	Title of Harveian Oration
1990	Dr. Andrew Doig	Dr. Anthony Toft	Mr. Alasdair MacGregor	"Insatiable Curiositie: The Stuart Influence in Medicine and Science."
1991	Dr. Iain Boyle	Dr. Anthony Toft	Mr. Alasdair MacGregor	"Harvey – A Man of his Time?"
1992	Prof.Geoffrey Chisholm	Dr. Anthony Toft	Mr. Alasdair MacGregor	"Harvey - Surgery and the Incorporation of Surgeons.”
1993	Prof. Charles Forbes	Dr. Anthony Toft	Mr. Alasdair MacGregor	"William Harvey - The Man."
1994	Dr. Martin Lees	Dr. Anthony Toft	Mr. Alasdair MacGregor	"William Harvey's World of Reproductive Medicine."
1995	Dr. Anthony Toft	Prof. Neil Douglas	Mr. Alasdair MacGregor	"The Magic of Medicine."
1996	Prof. Colin Bird	Prof. Neil Douglas	Mr. Alasdair MacGregor	"Genes, Dreams and Realities."
1997	Prof. Andrew Ross Lorimer	Prof. Neil Douglas	Mr. Alasdair MacGregor	"Child is Father of the Man."
1998	Prof. Sir David Carter	Prof. Neil Douglas	Mr. Alasdair MacGregor	"William Harvey and the Age of Opportunity."
1999	Prof. Robert Wood	Prof. Neil Douglas	Mr. Alasdair MacGregor	"Harvey – a Man for the Millennium."

== 2000s ==
List of Office Bearers and Harveian Orations during the 2000s
Year	President	Medical Secretary	Surgical Secretary	Title of Harveian Oration
2000	Prof. John Hunter	Prof. Neil Douglas	Mr. Alasdair MacGregor	"Heroes after Harvey."
2001	Prof. David Brynmor Thomas	Prof. Neil Douglas	Mr. Alasdair MacGregor	"The Harveian Paradigm."
2002	Prof. Andrew Calder	Prof. Neil Douglas	Mr. Alasdair MacGregor	"Nature's Secret Mysteries. (De Generatione Animabilis)."
2003	Prof. Sir Graeme Catto	Prof. Neil Douglas	Mr. Simon Paterson-Brown	"A Scottish Enlightenment."
2004	Prof. Neil Douglas	Dr. Kelvin Palmer	Mr. Simon Paterson-Brown	"Harvey and Educating Medical Men."
2005	Prof. Sir John Temple	Dr. Kelvin Palmer	Mr. Simon Paterson-Brown	"Just William; with Apologies to Richmal Crompton."
2006	Dr. Niall Finlayson	Dr. Kelvin Palmer	Mr. Simon Paterson-Brown	"Harvey's World."
2007	Prof. Anthony Seaton	Dr. Kelvin Palmer	Mr. Simon Paterson-Brown	"Harvey and the History of Air."
2008	Prof. James Hutchison	Dr. Kelvin Palmer	Mr. Simon Paterson-Brown	"The View from the Dwarf: Who Influenced Harvey, Who did Harvey Influence?"
2009	Prof. Sir John Savill	Dr. Kelvin Palmer	Mr. Simon Paterson-Brown	"Harvey's Next Grant Application."

== 2010s ==
List of Office Bearers and Harveian Orations during the 2010s
Year	President	Medical Secretary	Surgical Secretary	Title of Harveian Oration
2010	Prof. C. Michael Steel	Dr. Kelvin Palmer	Mr. Simon Paterson-Brown	"Harvey and the High Authorities."
2011	Prof. Stuart MacPherson	Dr. Kelvin Palmer	Mr. Simon Paterson-Brown	"From Folkestone to Hempstead."
2012	Prof. Gordon Lowe	Dr. Kelvin Palmer	Mr. Simon Paterson-Brown	“From Harvey to Heart Attacks – What Stoppeth the Circulation?”
2013	Dr. Nicholas Boon	Dr. Kelvin Palmer	Mr. Simon Paterson-Brown	"William Harvey: Lumper or Splitter."
2014	Prof. Janet Wilson	Prof. Angela Thomas	Mr. Simon Paterson-Brown	"Witchraft and Hysteria: the 'Gendered Heart' of William Harvey."
2015	Dr. Kelvin Palmer	Prof. Angela Thomas	Mr. Simon Paterson-Brown	"William Harvey: a Polymath."
2016	Dr. Dermot McKeown	Prof. Angela Thomas	Mr. Simon Paterson-Brown	"William Harvey: from pulsing glove to pulse oximeter."
2017	Prof. Allan Cumming	Prof. Angela Thomas	Mr. James "Sam" Patton	"William Harvey and the Circle of Life."
2018	Prof. James Garden	Prof. Angela Thomas	Mr. James "Sam" Patton	"William Harvey- why he could not be a Liver Surgeon."
2019	Prof. Sir Lewis Ritchie	Prof. Angela Thomas	Mr. James "Sam" Patton	"Bravehearts: Professionalism and Excellence in Scottish Medicine."

== 2020s ==
List of Office Bearers and Harveian Orations during the 2020s
Year	President	Medical Secretary	Surgical Secretary	Title of Harveian Oration
2020	Prof. William Reid	Prof. Angela Thomas	Mr. James "Sam" Patton	No Harveian Festival and no oration.
2021	Prof. William Reid	Prof. Angela Thomas	Mr. James "Sam" Patton	No Harveian Festival and no oration.
2022	Mr. Robert Jeffrey	Prof. Angela Thomas	Mr. James "Sam" Patton	"William Harvey and the History of Cardiac Surgery. A personal View."
2023	Prof. Angela Thomas	Prof. Mark Strachan	Mr. James "Sam" Patton	"William Harvey the revolutionist."
2024	Mr. Simon Paterson-Brown	Prof. Mark Strachan	Mr. James "Sam" Patton	"William Harvey - History, Heritage and Surgery."
2025	Prof. Stuart Pringle	Prof. Mark Strachan	Mr. James "Sam" Patton	"A Tale of Two Harveys."
2026	Prof. Jane Norman	Dr. Ian Penman	Mr. James "Sam" Patton	"Higher education’s innovation imperative: lessons in circulation from William Harvey."
2027	Prof. Brian Frier	Dr. Ian Penman	Mr. James "Sam" Patton	

The Harveian Festival was not held in 2020 or 2021 due to the COVID-19 pandemic.
