= Mary Syme Boyd =

Scottish artist and sculptor

- Born: August 15, 1910; Edinburgh, Scotland
- Died: October 30, 1997 (aged 87); Edinburgh, Scotland
- Resting place: Dean Cemetery, Edinburgh
- Education: Edinburgh College of Art
- Known for: Sculptures in plaster, wood, bronze, silver and stone.
- Notable work: Moon - a white cat (1935); Study of a Cat (1935); Kestrel (1936); Dancers (1936); Bird of prey (1945)

Mary Syme Boyd (15 August 1910 – 30 October 1997) was a Scottish artist and sculptor who studied at the Edinburgh College of Art from 1929 to 1933. She became known for her animal sculptures and exhibited at the Royal Scottish Academy (RSA) and the Royal Glasgow Institute (RGI).

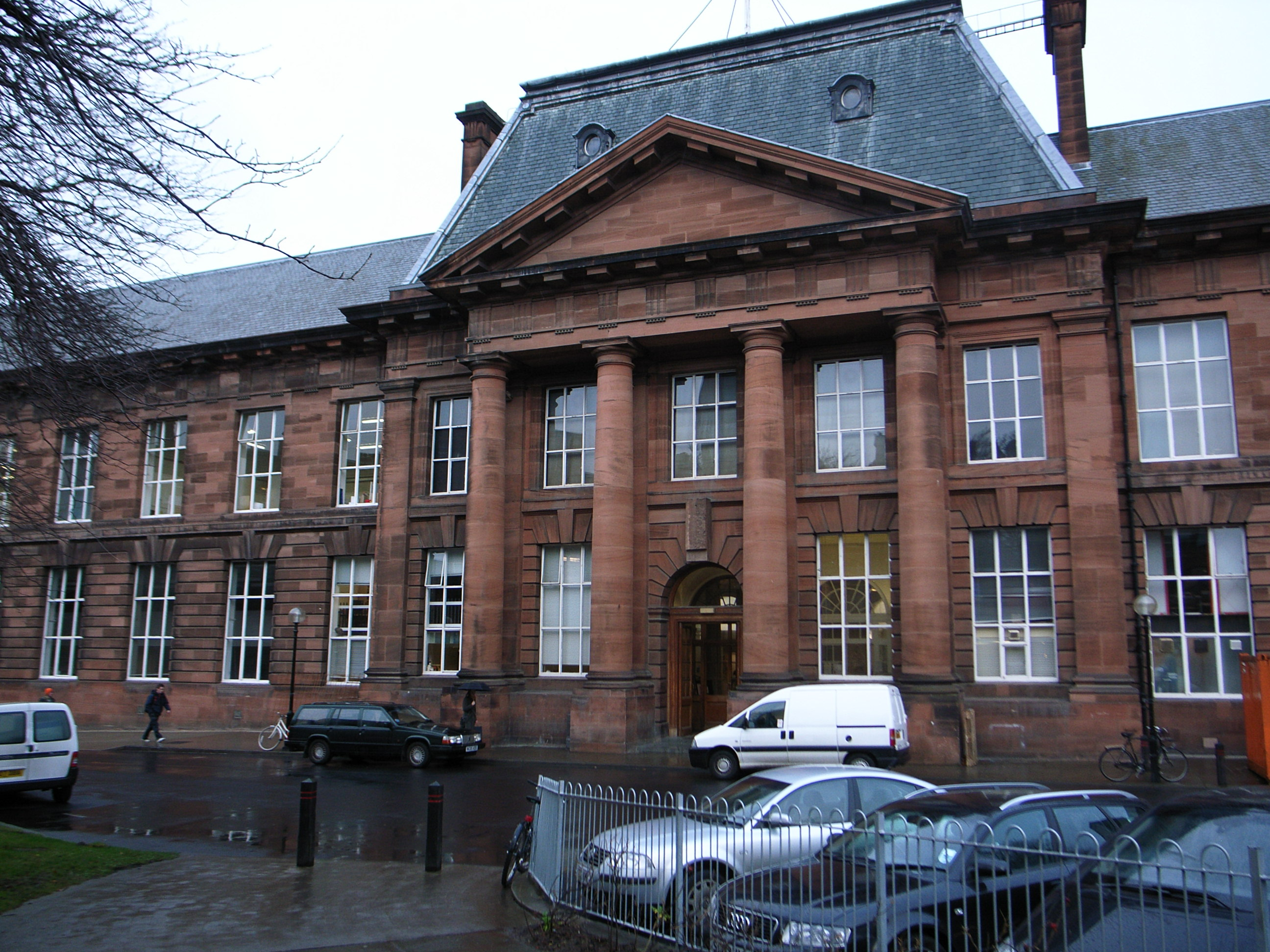
Edinburgh College of Art where Mary Syme Boyd studied from 1929 to 1933

== Early life and education ==
Mary Syme Boyd was born in Edinburgh in 1910. Her mother was Clara Constance Lepper (1875-1961) of Co.Antrim. Her father was Francis Darby Boyd (1866-1922), Professor of Clinical Medicine at the University of Edinburgh.

She attended the Edinburgh College of Art from 1929 to 1933. There she had access to a small animal menagerie where students were encouraged to make life studies. Boyd's fascination with animals went on to become the primary subject matter throughout her career.

Like her fellow animal sculptor and Edinburgh College of Art alumni, Phyllis Bone, before her Boyd was awarded a travel scholarship to study in Paris in 1931–32, where she studied under the tutelage of the acclaimed animalier sculptor, Edouard Navellier. There she developed her techniques in bronze casting.

In 1934, Boyd was awarded another scholarship which allowed her to travel to Denmark, Sweden, Germany, Belgium and France. According to the Biographical Dictionary of Scottish Women "her notebooks about her European tour and her wartime service are extraordinary testaments." Whilst travelling, she sought out examples of modern sculpture but also admired pewter, Danish silver and wood carvings in churches. Later that same year, Boyd returned to Edinburgh to settle in Belford Mews, where she stayed until her death.

Apart from the diaries she kept during her European tour and wartime service, little else is known about Boyd's life outside of her artwork other than she did not marry or have children. There are accounts of "her great love of driving and her exploration of the Scottish Highlands" .

She died in Edinburgh on 30 October 1997 and was buried with her sister Lesbia Boyd in Dean Cemetery. The grave lies very close to the main entrance, on the south side of the central east–west path. Her parents lie alongside, with a hand-carved stone by Mary. Some records say she carved her own name on her memorial with only the date to infill. Her name is not carved, as with her sister's name above it, is added in preformed lead letters.

== Career ==
From 1935 to 1963, Boyd's professional career was conducted from a house/studio at 14 Belford Mews. This was only interrupted by her wartime service as part of the London Auxiliary Ambulance Service during the London blitz.

Boyd exhibited at the Royal Scottish Academy (RSA), the Royal Glasgow Institute (RGI), and the Society of Scottish Artists. She worked in plaster, bronze, silver, carved wood, and stone. Her exhibited work consisted of naturalistic animal studies, and allegorical subjects and she undertook a number of ecclesiastical commissions such as work for St. Mary's Episcopal Church in Corstorphine.

== Notable works (by year of exhibition) ==
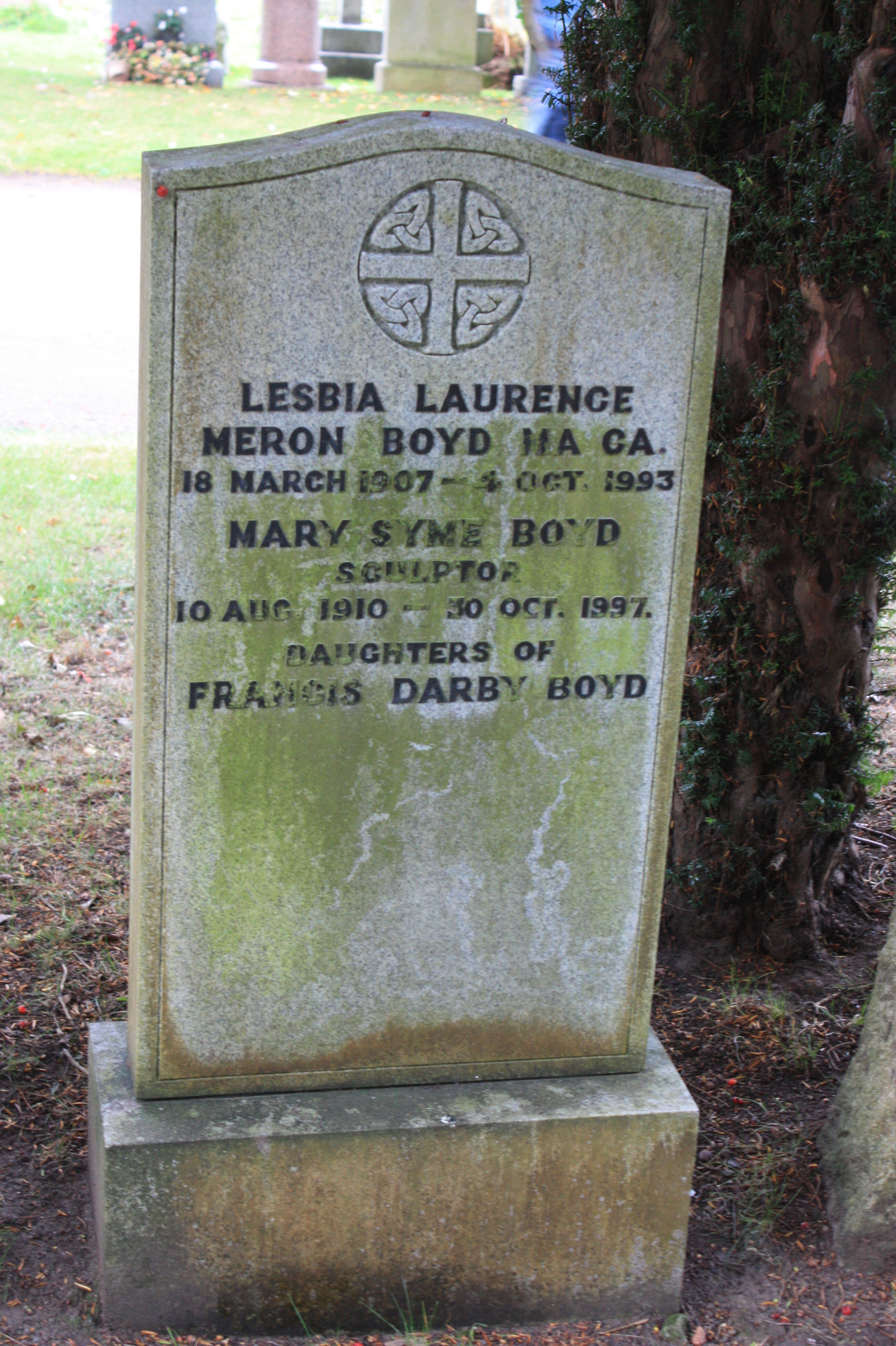
The grave of Mary Syme Boyd, Dean Cemetery

- Moon - a white cat (1935)
- The wild boar (1935)
- The kestrel (1935)
- Study of a Cat (c.1935)
- Dancers (1936)
- Kestrel carved in Sabique (1936)
- Bird of prey (1945)
- Station of the cross (1951)

Boyd bequeathed Kestrel to the National Galleries of Scotland as representative of her life's work.

"Bird sculptures often took the form of an outstretched-winged hunting bird on a rocky outcrop, usually with a tiny victim writhing in its claws, or in territorial combat with another bird. Boyd's Kestrel, however, eschews these narrative orthodoxies and aligns instead with modernist principles, choosing to depict this bird as a benign creature. Carved from wood, Kestrel's simple lines and unadorned surface serve to illustrate that Boyd was aware of modernist discourse involving 'truth to materials', espoused by Henry Moore and Barbara Hepworth at this time."

Included in the bequest were two additional sculptures: one by Elizabeth Dempster and one by Georg Kolbe.
