= William Farquharson (surgeon) =

Scottish surgeon

William Farquharson (1760-1823) was a senior Scottish surgeon during the Scottish Enlightenment. He served as President of the Royal College of Surgeons of Edinburgh 1806-8 and President of the Harveian Society of Edinburgh in both 1796 and 1805.

== Life ==
He was born in Balfour, Aberdeenshire in 1760 the son of Alexander Farquharson of Balfour (b.1716) and his wife Margaret Davie of Newmill.

In 1790 he was elected a Fellow of the Royal Society of Edinburgh. His proposers were James Gregory, James Russell and Robert Kerr.

In 1795 he was a Crown Witness at the trial and imprisonment of Sir Archibald Gordon Kinloch of Gilmerton for the murder of his half-brother Sir Robert Kinloch at Gilmerton House. The trial was judged by Lord Braxfield. Farquharson’s testimony focussed upon Kinloch’s mental state on two previous occasions, each tended by Dr Farquharson (the second being in Haddington jail). As one of the oddest of British judgements, although Kinloch was sentenced to life imprisonment on 15 July, Dr Farquharson offered to hold him securely in his own home rather than in prison, and the judge accepted this on 17 July. His house at this time was at Worlds End Close on the Royal Mile. However, Farquharson disappears from the Post Office Directories for several years; presumably to hold Kinloch in a less urban environment. This was a very considerable personal sacrifice. He rematerialises in Edinburgh following the death of Kinloch in 1800. He then lived at 16 St James Square.

In 1793 Farquharson was elected a member of the Harveian Society of Edinburgh and served as President in 1796 and 1805. In 1802 he delivered the Harveian oration to the Society entitled "Account of Vesalius". In 1801 he was elected a member of the Aesculapian Club.

In 1807 he is noted as donating 5 guineas towards the new Edinburgh Lunatic Asylum.

His final Edinburgh address was 2 Elder Street in the First New Town.

He died in Edinburgh on 25 January 1823.

== Family ==
He was married twice and had two sons: Joseph Canvin Farquharson (who became a banker) and Francis Farquharson of Finzean (1802-1876)
