= Donald Douglas (surgeon) =

Scottish surgeon (1911–1993)

Sir Donald Douglas MBE FRSE FRCS FRCSEd
- Born: 28 June 1911; St Andrews, Scotland
- Died: 28 January 1993 (aged 81); Blairgowrie, Scotland
- Education: Madras College; University of St Andrews
- Occupation: Surgeon
- Known for: Professor of Surgery Universities of St Andrews/Dundee; President of the Royal College of Surgeons of Edinburgh

Sir Donald Macleod Douglas, MBE, FRCS, FRCSE, FRSE (28 June 1911 – 28 January 1993) was a Scottish academic surgeon. His schooling and medical undergraduate education were at St Andrews following which he embarked at an early stage on an academic career, winning a scholarship to pursue research at the Mayo Clinic, Minnesota.

After further research at the Royal Postgraduate Medical School in London he served in World War II as a surgical specialist with the Eighth Army in North Africa and was seconded from military duties to serve as Professor of Surgery in Baghdad.

As professor of Surgery in St Andrews and Dundee, he developed research interests in wound healing and the design of operating theatres. He was president of the Association of Surgeons of Great Britain and Ireland and of the Royal College of Surgeons of Edinburgh and was knighted in 1972.

== Early life ==
Donald Macleod Douglas was born in St Andrews in 1911. His father was William Douglas, a schoolteacher and his mother Christina Douglas (née Broom). He was educated at Madras College, St Andrews going on to study medicine at the University of St Andrews, and graduating MB ChB in 1934. He was awarded a university blue for rugby.

== Early career ==
After junior hospital appointments in Dundee and London, the award of a Commonwealth Fellowship enabled him to travel to the United States, where from 1937-1939 he was a fellow in surgery at the Mayo Foundation, Rochester, Minnesota. He obtained the degree of Master of Surgery from the University of Minnesota before returning to the United Kingdom in 1939 to become first assistant in Surgery at the Royal Postgraduate Medical School in London.

In that same year he became a Fellow of the Royal College of Surgeons of England and was awarded the degree of Master of Surgery (ChM) by the University of St Andrews. In the Second World War he joined the Royal Army Medical Corps (RAMC) as a surgical specialist. During this period, he saw service with the Eighth Army in North Africa and tended the injured at the Battle of El Alamein.

He was then posted to Iraq where, because of his academic experience, he was seconded to act as Professor of Surgery in the University of Baghdad. He was demobilised with the rank of lieutenant-colonel and was awarded the military MBE for wartime service.

== Academic career ==
After the war, he became senior lecturer at the Royal Postgraduate Medical School and in 1947 was appointed reader in experimental surgery at the University of Edinburgh. This post carried a major responsibility for research and he acted as deputy director of Wilkie Surgical Research Laboratories. Here he continued his earlier research studies on gastro-intestinal physiology and the use of radio-isotopes in surgical research. Working under Professor James Learmonth he had clinical responsibilities in the Royal Infirmary of Edinburgh and with Learmonth developed an interest in the surgery of vascular disease. During this period he began research into the factors influencing wound healing, which became a topic on which he continued to research and publish throughout his career. In 1951, he was appointed as the first full-time professor of surgery at the University of St Andrews with clinical responsibilities at Dundee Royal Infirmary.

His surgical department in Dundee developed vascular and cardiovascular surgery. In his academic department, the major research interests were wound healing and surgical infection. With a reputation as an effective administrator and organiser he was involved in the design of hospital wards and operating theatres of Ninewells Hospital, Dundee which opened in 1974. He retired from the chair in 1976.

== Honours and awards ==
In 1965, he became Surgeon to the Queen in Scotland. He was president of the Association of Surgeons of Great Britain and Ireland from 1963 to 1964, president of the Surgical Research Society of Great Britain from 1966 to 1968 and president of the Royal College of Surgeons of Edinburgh from 1970 to 1973. In 1965 he was elected a member of the Harveian Society of Edinburgh and served as President in 1974.

In 1972, he was created knight bachelor and was awarded the honorary degree of Doctor of Science (DSc) from the University of St Andrews. He was made a fellow of the Royal Society of Edinburgh but resigned in 1978.

== Family ==
He was married with two daughters and two sons, one of whom, Sir Neil Douglas, was president of the Royal College of Physicians of Edinburgh.

Douglas died at Blairgowrie Cottage Hospital on 28 January 1993.

== Selected publications ==
Douglas, D.M., & Mann, F.C. (1941). Effect of Peritoneal Irritation on the Activity of the Intestine. British Medical Journal, 1 4180, 227-31

Douglas, D.M. (1948). Repair of large herniae with tantalum gauze; an experimental and clinical study. Lancet, 1 6512, 936-9

Douglas, D.M. (1949). Tensile strength of sutures; loss when implanted in living tissue.Lancet, 2 6577, 499-501

Douglas, D.M. (1962). Operating-theatre design. Lancet, 2 7248, 163-9

Douglas, D.M. (1962) Problems and responsibilities of the university surgical unit. British Medical Journal 2(4782):469-72.

Douglas, D.M., Howie, G.F., & Lyall, M. (1973). Late results of autogenous-vein grafting and lumbar sympathectomy in ischaemic limbs. Lancet, 1 7801, 459-61
