= William Rutherford Sanders =

Scottish pathologist

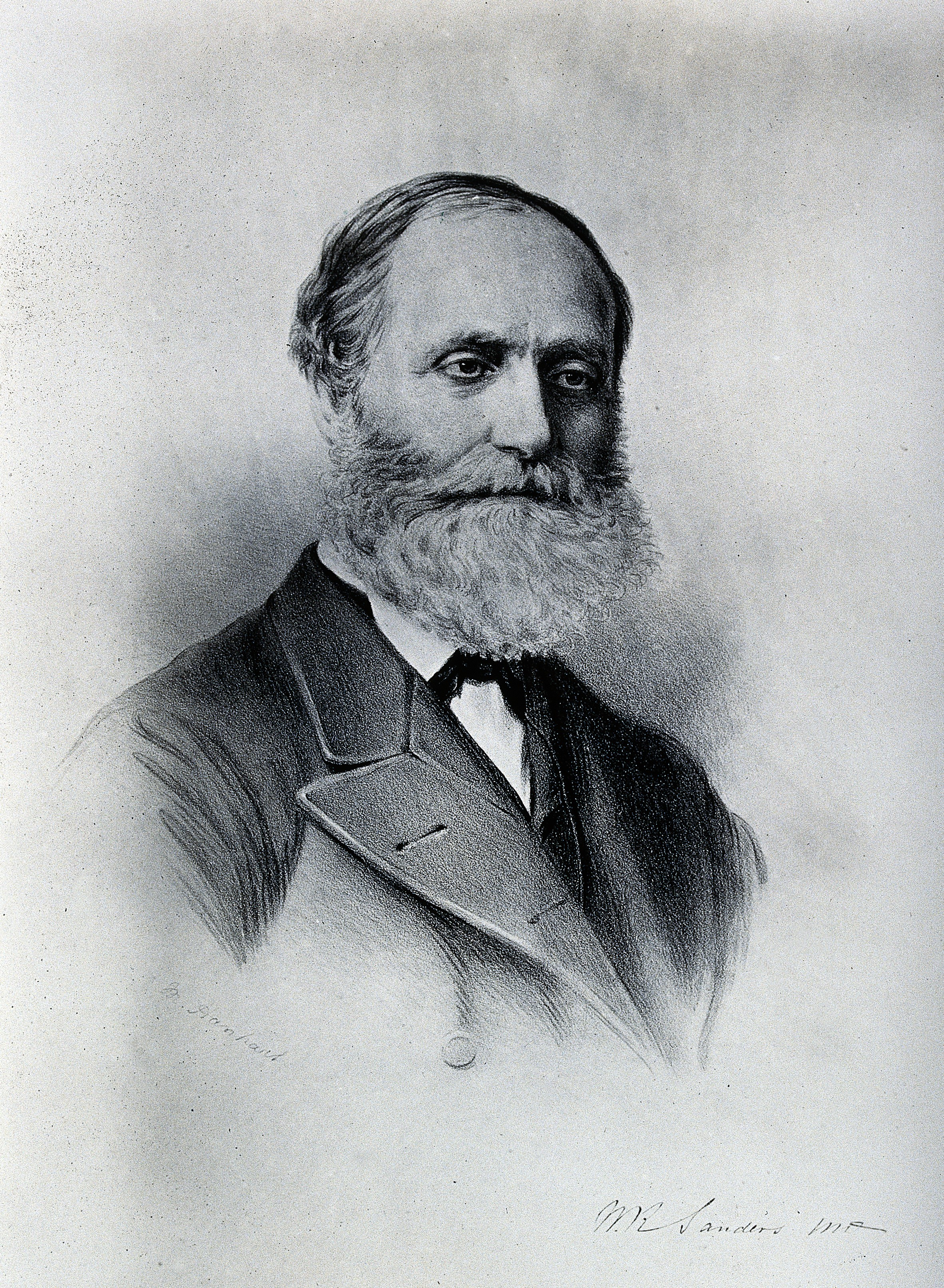
William Rutherford Sanders

Original photograph

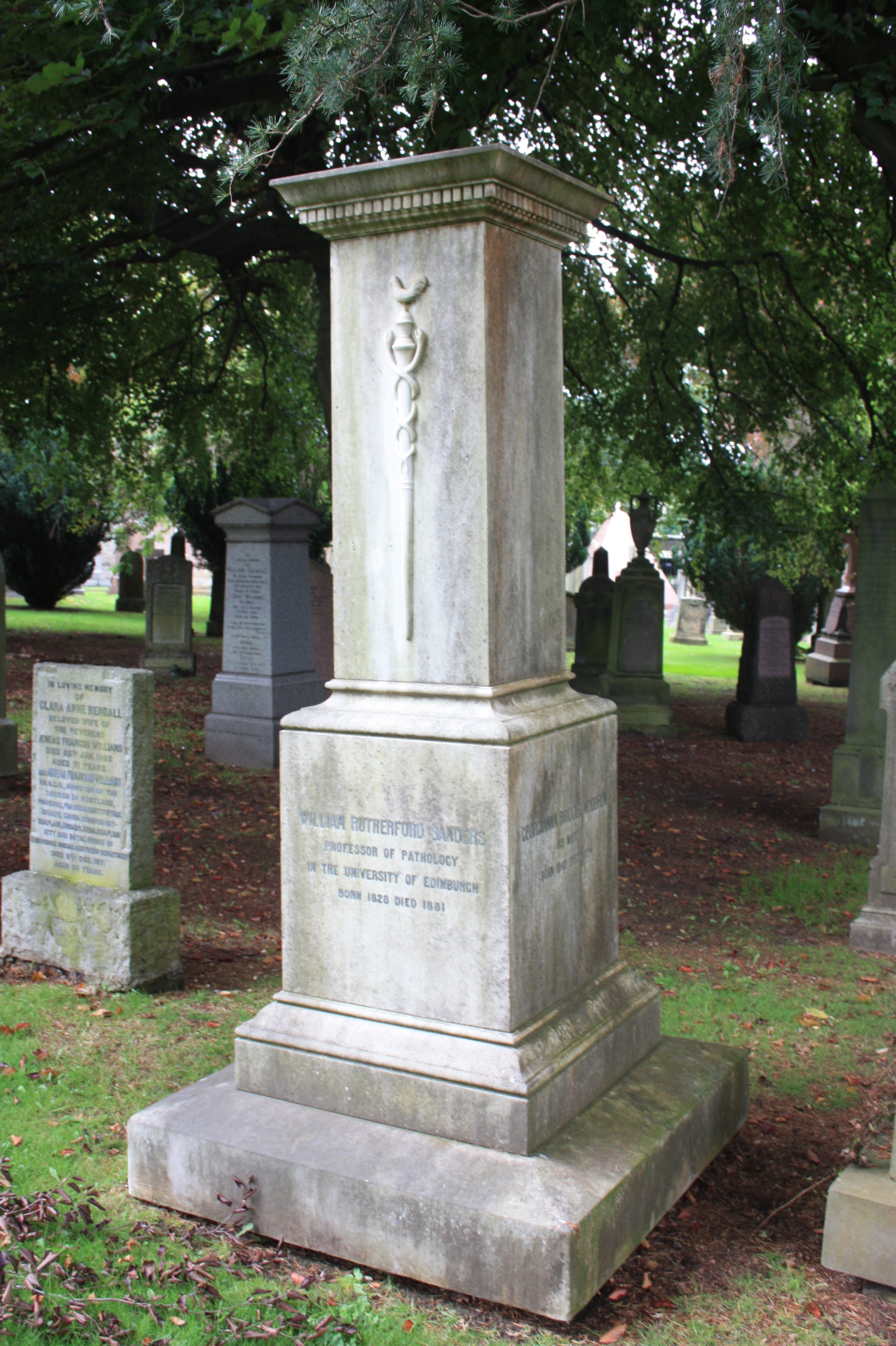
The grave of William Rutherford Sanders, Dean Cemetery, Edinburgh

William Rutherford Sanders FRSE (17 February 1828 – 18 February 1881) was a 19th-century Scottish pathologist. He was one of the first to advocate the use of digitalis in heart conditions. He served as President of the Royal Medical Society 1847/8.

== Life ==
Sanders was born on 17 February 1828 at 15 Duke Street in Edinburgh's New Town (the street was renamed Dublin Street in 1920 after Edinburgh joined with Leith). He was the son of Dr James Sanders (d.1843). His early education was at the High School in Edinburgh.

The family moved to Montpelier in the south of France in 1842 and William continued his education there. His father died there in 1843 but he remained in France to complete his education. He attended the University of Montpellier and graduated as a Bachelor of Letters in 1844. He returned to his home city of Edinburgh in June 1844 and began to study medicine at the University of Edinburgh. He gained his doctorate (MD) in 1849. He did further postgraduate studies in both Paris and Heidelberg.

Returning to Edinburgh he began working as a pathologist at Edinburgh Royal Infirmary in 1852. In 1853 he succeeded Harold and John Goodsir as Curator of the Museum within the Royal College of Surgeons of Edinburgh. In 1857 he became senior Physician at the Infirmary and from 1869 he was also given the chair in Pathology by the University of Edinburgh.

In 1854 Sanders was elected a member of the Harveian Society of Edinburgh and was one of its secretaries from 1871-1881. In 1865 he was elected a member of the Aesculapian Club. In 1870 he was elected a Fellow of the Royal Society of Edinburgh his proposer being John Hutton Balfour.

A chronic abscess formed in 1874 and gradually worsened, causing him to retire from most duties. An attack of hemiplegia caused him total loss of speech from September 1880.

He died of an apopleptic fit at home, 30 Charlotte Square in Edinburgh on 18 February 1881, aged only 53. He is buried in one of the central sections of Dean Cemetery close to a main path.

== Family ==
In 1861 he was married to Georgianna Bridget Woodrow of Norwich (1842–1894). They had five children.

== Artistic recognition ==
His bust by John Hutchison is held by the Royal College of Surgeons of Edinburgh.

== Publications ==
- On the Anatomy of the Spleen (1849)
- Paralysis of the Palate in Facial Palsy (1865)
- Facial Hemiplegia (1865)
