= John Wheeler Dowden =

Surgeon (1866-1936)

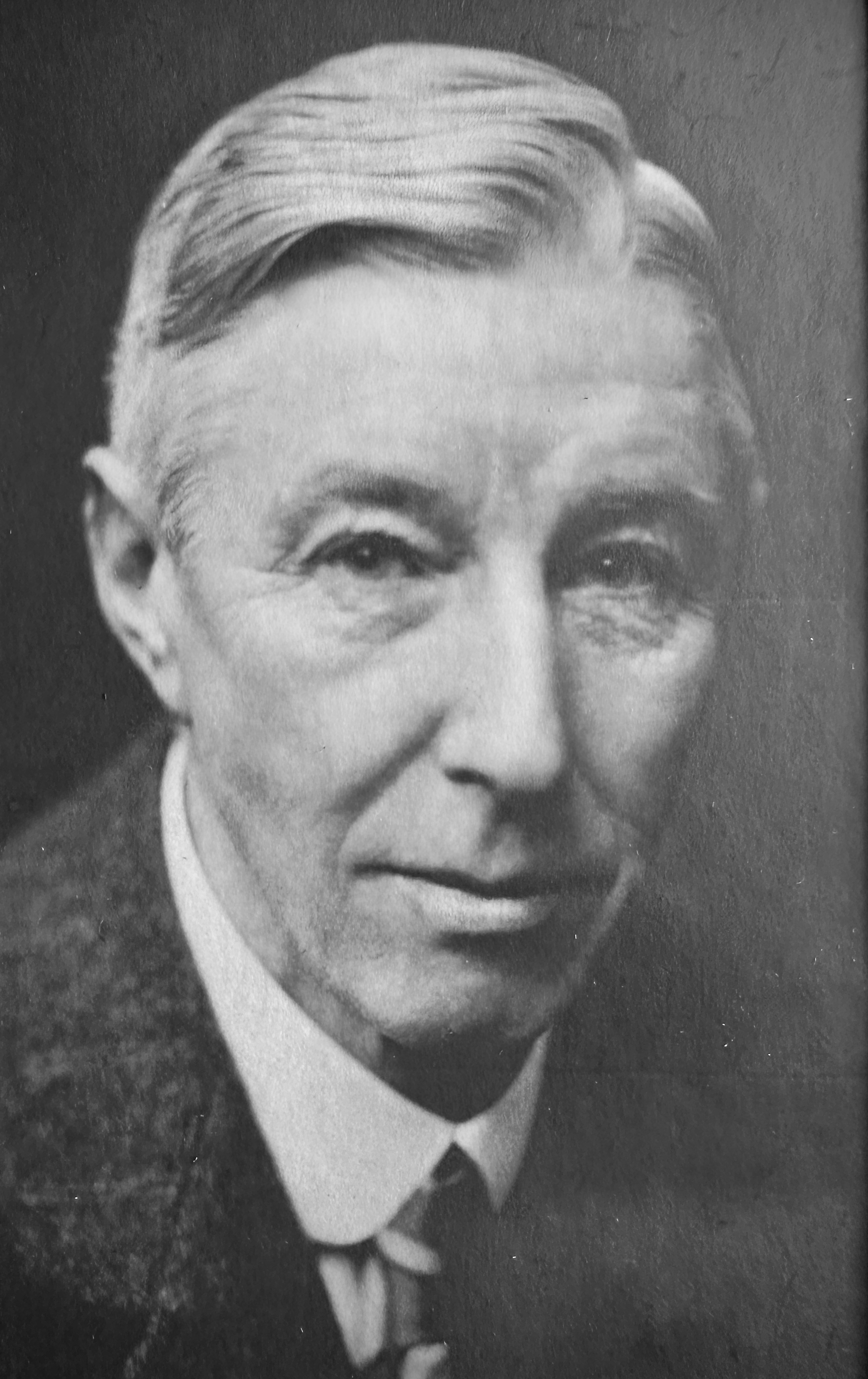
- Born: 1 October 1866; Dublin, Ireland
- Died: 8 March 1936 (aged 69); Edinburgh, Scotland
- Occupation: Surgeon
- Known for: President Royal College of Surgeons of Edinburgh

John Wheeler Dowden, FRCSEd (1 October 1866 – 8 March 1936) was a surgeon, born in Ireland, who worked for most of his career at the Royal Infirmary of Edinburgh. He was president of the Royal College of Surgeons of Edinburgh from 1931 to 1933.

== Early life and education ==
Dowden was born in Dublin, Ireland in 1866, where his father John Dowden was a Church of Ireland clergyman. In 1874 Rev Dowden was appointed Professor of Theology at the Scottish Episcopal church's Trinity College, Glenalmond, Scotland, moving there with his wife Louisa (née Jones) and their six children. The following year when the College relocated to Edinburgh, the family moved to live there.

Dowden was educated at Merchiston Castle School, Edinburgh where he played for the school cricket and rugby teams and for many years after leaving school played for the Merchistonian and Edinburgh Wanderers Rugby Clubs.

He studied medicine at the Faculty of Medicine of the University of Edinburgh graduating MB, CM in 1890.

== Career ==
His career began at the Royal Infirmary of Edinburgh (RIE) as house physician under Dr David Brackenridge and house surgeon under Professor Thomas Annandale and then at the Royal Edinburgh Hospital for Sick Children as house surgeon under Joseph Bell.

For a short time he served as assistant to Dr Thomas Burn Murdoch in general practice in Morningside, Edinburgh. After completing the diploma of Fellowship of the Royal College of Surgeons of Edinburgh ( FRCSEd) in 1894 he became assistant surgeon to the Hospital for Sick Children, and tutor in Clinical Surgery in the School of Medicine of the Royal Colleges of Edinburgh based at Surgeons' Hall. After a period as surgical tutor and private assistant to Professor Annandale he was appointed assistant surgeon to the RIE and in 1912 became surgeon in charge of wards. After retiring from the RIE in 1924 he became surgeon to Chalmers' Hospital, Edinburgh for five years.

During World War I Dowden was commissioned as a captain in the Royal Army Medical Corps (R.A.M.C). serving at the Second Scottish General Hospital at Craigleith, (later the Western General Hospital). Here he served alongside a fellow surgeon Montagu Cotterill, whose father, Like Dowden's had been Bishop of Edinburgh and who, like Dowden would go on to become President of the RCSEd.He also saw service at Edinburgh War Hospital at Bangour.

In 1901 Dowden was elected a member of the Harveian Society of Edinburgh and was one of its secretaries from 1903 to 1933. In 1921 he was elected a member of the Aesculapian Club. He was elected President of the Royal College of Surgeons of Edinburgh in 1931.

in 1933, when the University of Edinburgh celebrated its 350th anniversary, he received the honorary degree of LL.D.

Dowden took a lifelong interest in Merchiston Castle School and during his time as chairman of the Governing Board, he was actively involved in the relocation of the school to Colinton.

== Family ==
In 1886 his father Rev John Dowden was consecrated as Episcopalian Bishop of Edinburgh and served in St Mary's Episcopal Cathedral, Edinburgh.

In 1907 he married Edith Georgina Oswald, daughter of H. R. Oswald, an Edinburgh medical graduate who had served as surgeon -general in the Indian Army.

Dowden died in Edinburgh on 8 March 1936.
