= Peter David Handyside =

Scottish surgeon and anatomist

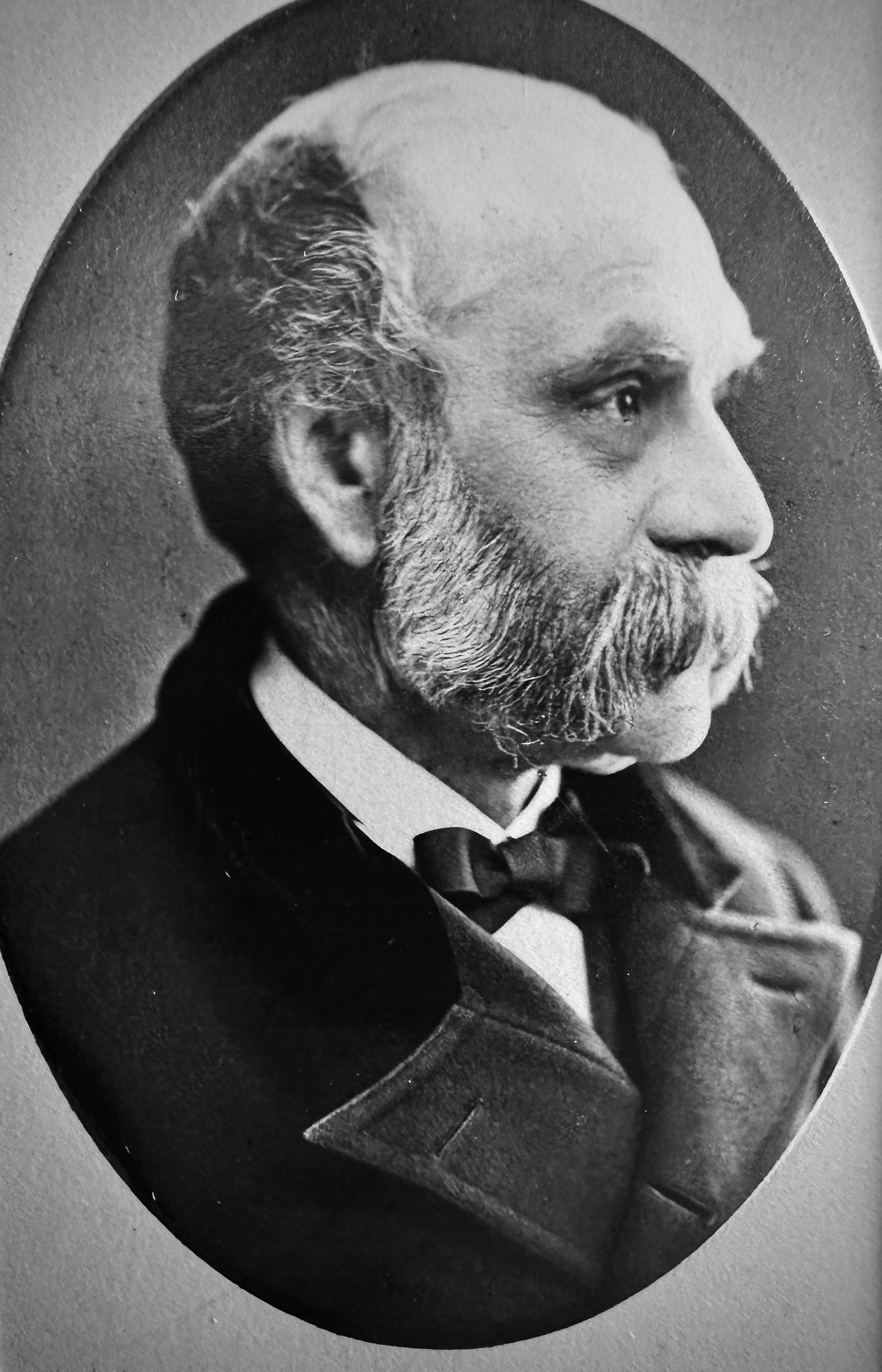

Peter David Handyside FRSE FRCSE (1808–1881) was a Scottish surgeon and anatomist. He was president of the Royal Medical Society in 1828. He won the Harveian Society Medal in 1827. He was also president of the Medico-Chirurgical Society of Edinburgh in 1871.

== Life ==
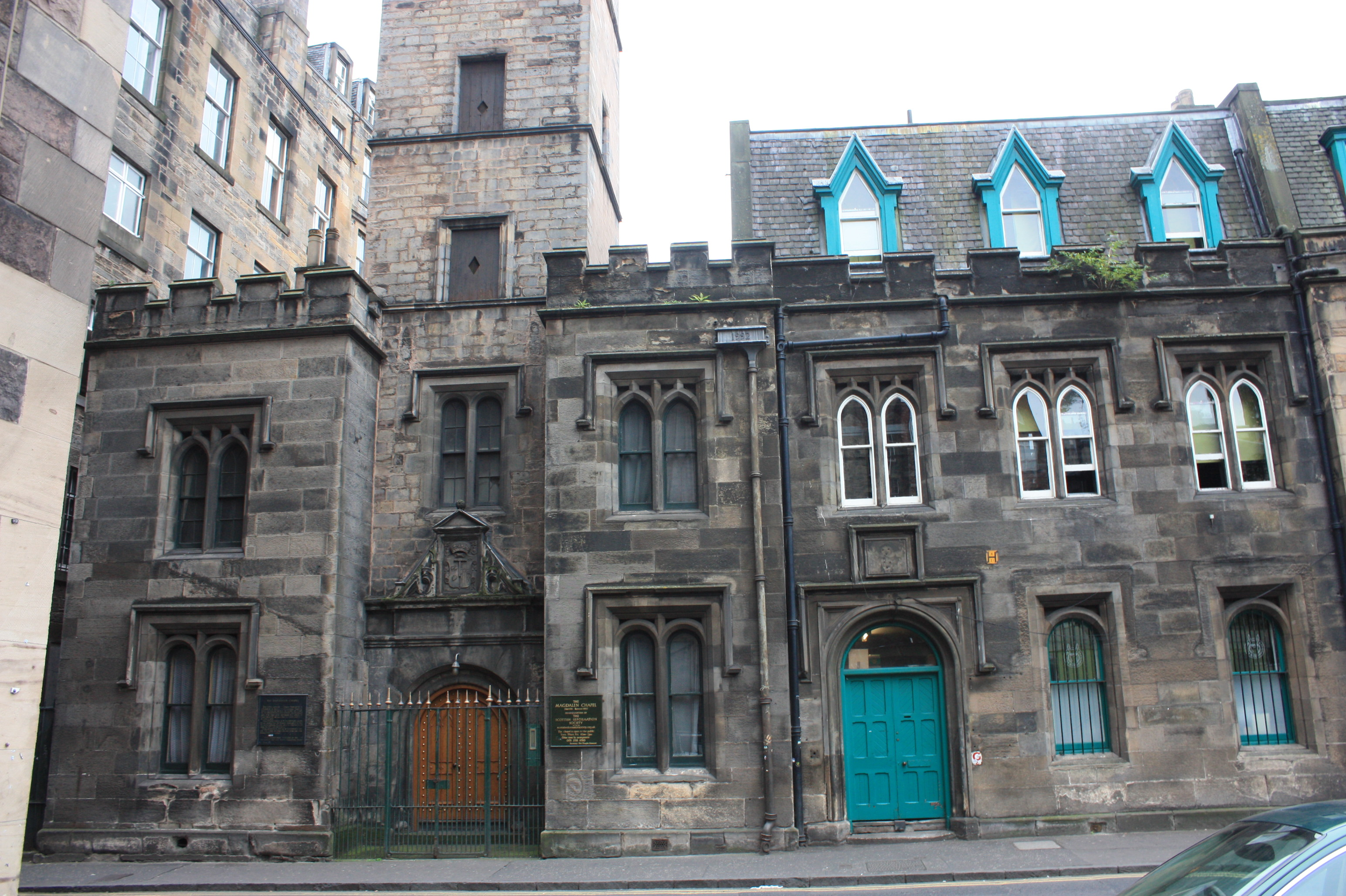
The Livingstone Memorial Institute, Cowgate, Edinburgh

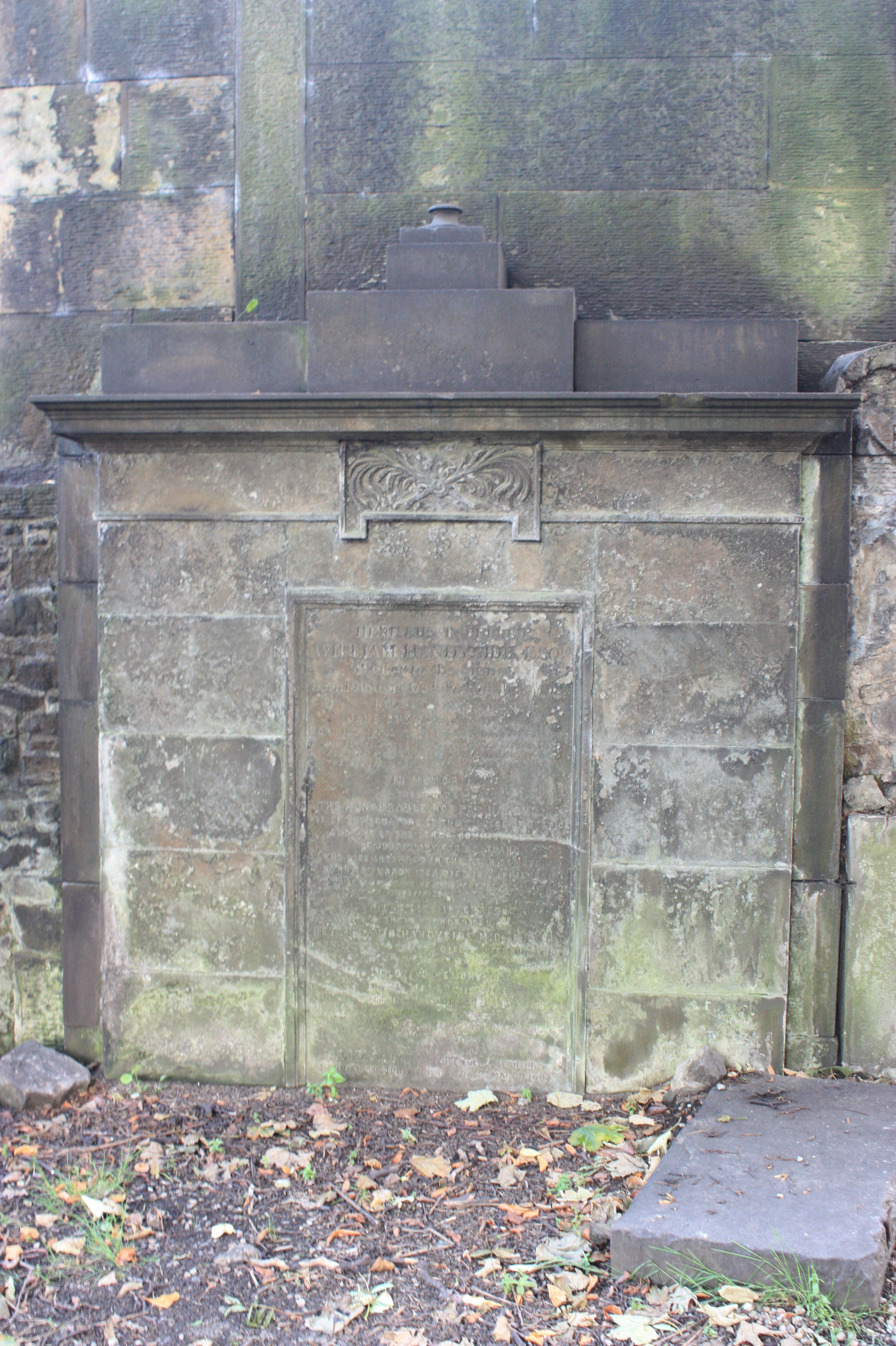
The grave of Peter David Handyside, St Cuthbert's Churchyard, Edinburgh

Handyside was born at 16 South Frederick Street in Edinburgh’s New Town on 26 October 1808, the son of Jane Cuninghame and William Handyside WS (1746–1818), a lawyer. His elder brother Robert Handyside (1798–1858) rose to the top of the Scottish legal world, becoming Lord Handyside. He was apprenticed to the eminent surgeon James Syme to train as a doctor. He studied medicine at the University of Edinburgh. He then undertook postgraduate studies first in Paris and then in Heidelberg under the eminent physiologist Friedrich Tiedemann.

He gained his doctorate (MD) from the University of Edinburgh in 1833.

In 1833, he began lecturing in anatomy at the University of Edinburgh later also lecturing in systematic surgery, both based at Surgeons' Square. In 1834 Handyside was elected a member of the Harveian Society of Edinburgh and served as one of its secretaries from 1837-1849. In 1836, he was elected a Fellow of the Royal Society of Edinburgh, his proposer being his mentor, James Syme. He was a councillor to the Society 1869–71. In 1837 he was elected a member of the Aesculapian Club.

In 1839, he became a senior surgeon at Edinburgh Royal Infirmary on Drummond Street. In 1858, he founded the Cowgate Medical Mission Dispensary in Edinburgh’s Old Town, aimed at giving relief to the poor (especially Irish Catholic) population in that area of the city. Under the subsequent leadership of William Thomson, this dispensary was later supplemented by the Edinburgh Medical Missionary Society's Training Institution in 1861. This was all housed in a building designed by Richard Crichton some 50 years earlier, attached to the Magdalene Chapel. It was expanded and extended in 1878 to create the Livingstone Memorial Institute. This facility later evolved into EMMS International.

Handyside died at home, 16 Landsdowne Crescent in Edinburgh’s West End, on 21 February 1881. He is buried with his parents in St Cuthbert's Churchyard at the west end of Princes Street. The grave lies to the south-east of the church very close to the entrance to Princes Street Gardens (screened by the Hamilton vault when approaching from the west).

== Family ==
He was married to Eliza Walsh (1811–1882) and together they had three daughters.
