= James Ross (surgeon) =

Scottish surgeon (1911–1997)

James Ross MBE, FRCSEd
- Born: 25 June 1911; Edinburgh, Scotland
- Died: 12 April 1997 (aged 85); Edinburgh, Scotland
- Education: Merchiston Castle School; University of Edinburgh
- Occupation: Surgeon
- Known for: Presidency Royal College of Surgeons of Edinburgh
- Medical career
- Institutions: Royal Infirmary of Edinburgh; Eastern General Hospital, Edinburgh

James Alexander Ross MBE, FRCSEd (25 June 1911 – 12 April 1997) was a Scottish surgeon awarded the MBE for his service in the Second World War. He was a leading member of the surgical team which, in 1960, carried out the first successful kidney transplant in the United Kingdom. He served as president of the Royal College of Surgeons of Edinburgh.

== Early life ==
James Alexander Ross was born in Edinburgh in 1911 and spent his early childhood in Brazil where his father was a banker. He returned to Scotland aged nine and was educated at Merchiston Castle School, Edinburgh of which he later became a governor. He entered the medical faculty of the University of Edinburgh in 1928 where he showed an early enthusiasm for anatomy which was to persist throughout his life.

He graduated MB ChB in 1934 but before then he had decided to become a surgeon and after holding junior posts in Edinburgh and London, passed the examinations to become a Fellow of the Royal College of Surgeons of Edinburgh (RCSEd) in 1938. Later that year he was appointed Clinical Tutor in the Royal Infirmary of Edinburgh.

== War service ==
At the outbreak of war in September 1939 he volunteered for service with the Royal Army Medical Corps (RAMC) as a surgical specialist. In 1940 he treated casualties from the Dunkirk evacuation and was then posted to Egypt with No 58 General Hospital RAMC. Here he treated casualties from most of the major battles fought by the 8th Army in the North African campaign and in the invasions of Sicily and Italy. Early in 1944 he was posted to the Anzio beachhead with No 15 Casualty Clearing Station and for his services there he was awarded Membership of the Order of the British Empire (MBE).

== Surgical career ==
After demobilisation in 1945 with the rank of Lieutenant Colonel he returned to Edinburgh and worked initially in the University Anatomy Department where he produced the thesis for which, in 1947, he was granted the degree of Doctor of Medicine (MD). In that year, he was appointed assistant surgeon to Leith Hospital and to the Royal Infirmary of Edinburgh. When the National Health Service was founded in 1948 he acquired the new designation of Consultant Surgeon and took charge of the Surgical Out-Patient Department.

When Professor (later Sir) Michael Woodruff was appointed to the Edinburgh Chair of Surgical Science in 1957, James Ross joined his surgical team in the Royal Infirmary as its senior member. In this capacity, he played an important part in the first successful British kidney transplant which was successfully carried out by a team led by Professor Woodruff in 1960. Ross removed the donor kidney which was transplanted into the recipient, the donor's twin brother, by Woodruff.

In 1961 he was invited to set up a new general surgical unit at the Eastern General Hospital, Edinburgh and the success of this unit was largely due to his energy and leadership. As Honorary Consultant Surgeon to the Army in Scotland from 1970-1976 and the surgical unit at the Eastern General was selected by the RAMC for the training of its surgical specialists. A succession of army surgeons were seconded for periods of one year under his tutelage. Ross always had a special interest in the surgical subspecialty of urology.

He collaborated with Sir John Bruce and Professor Robert Walmsley in writing the textbook Manual of Surgical Anatomy. In 1960 Ross was elected a member of the Harveian Society of Edinburgh and served as president in 1978. In 1971 he was elected a member of the Aesculapian Club.

== College activities ==
After his election as a Fellow, Ross became closely involved in the activities of the RCSEd. He became secretary in 1960 and in his eight years in office he acquired a valuable knowledge of college history, traditions and laws. He was elected vice president in 1971 and president in 1973. Ross was largely responsible for the establishment of the college's triennial overseas meetings and was a prime mover in the reform of higher surgical examinations together with the orthopaedic surgeon Professor JIP James and the neurosurgeon John Gillingham. The early proposals were refined under his successors and ultimately resulted in the institution of higher intercollegiate examinations in the surgical specialties.

When his presidential term ended in 1976 he took on the chairmanship of the RCSEd Appeal which raised funds for the conversion of the postgraduate residence in Hill Square, which was subsequently concerted into Ten Hill Square hotel.

== Later life ==
His book The Edinburgh School of Surgery after Lister, published in 1978, is a valuable contribution to Scottish medical history. His historical knowledge enabled him to play an important part in the planning of the Sir Jules Thorn Historical Exhibition in Surgeons' Hall Museum.
