= William Seller =

Scottish physician and botanist (1797–1869)

Dr William Seller FRSE PRCPE (9 November 1797 – 11 April 1869) was a Scottish physician and botanist. From 1848 to 1850 he was President of the Royal College of Physicians of Edinburgh.

== Life ==
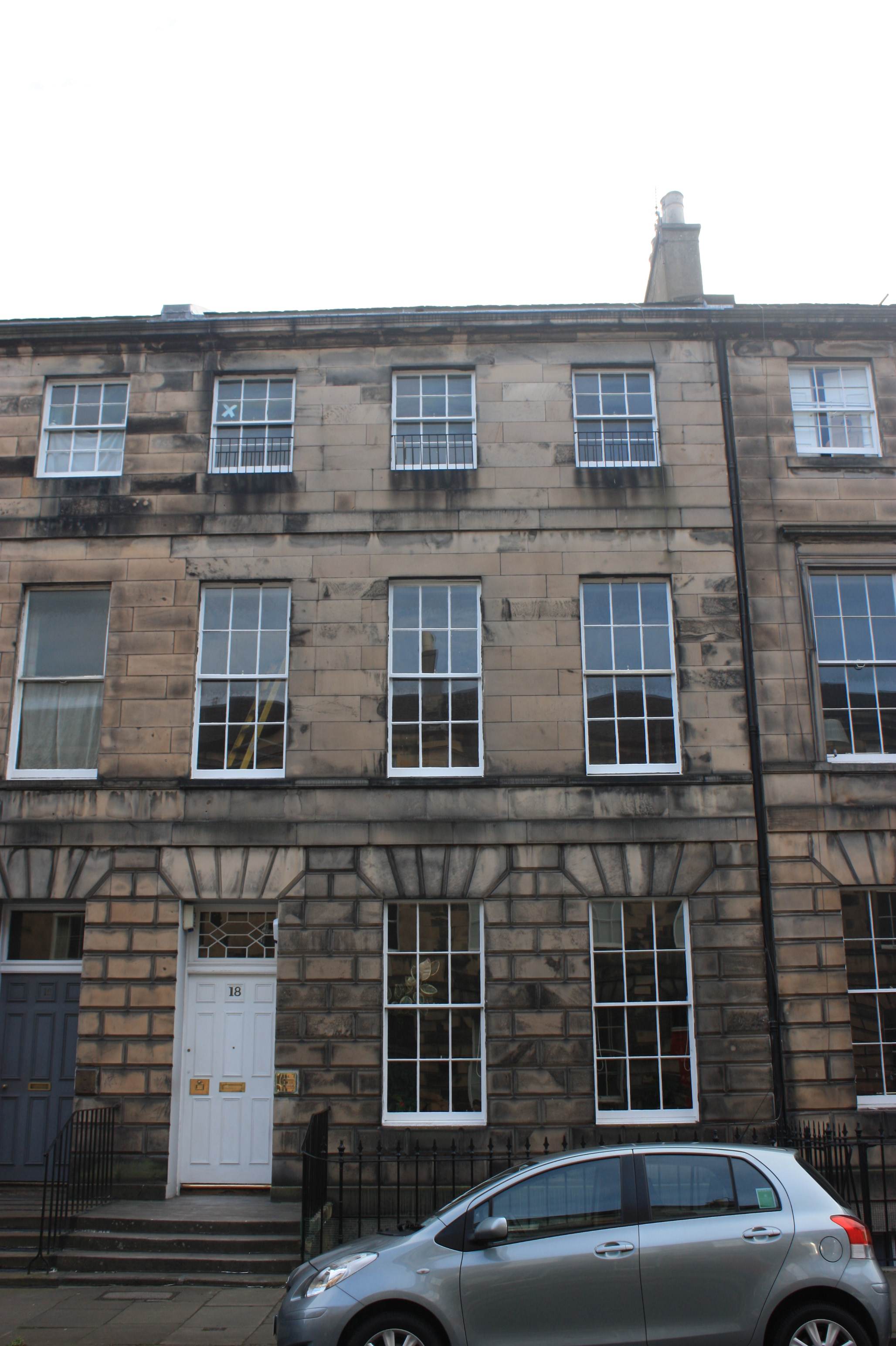
Seller's house at 18 Northumberland Street, Edinburgh

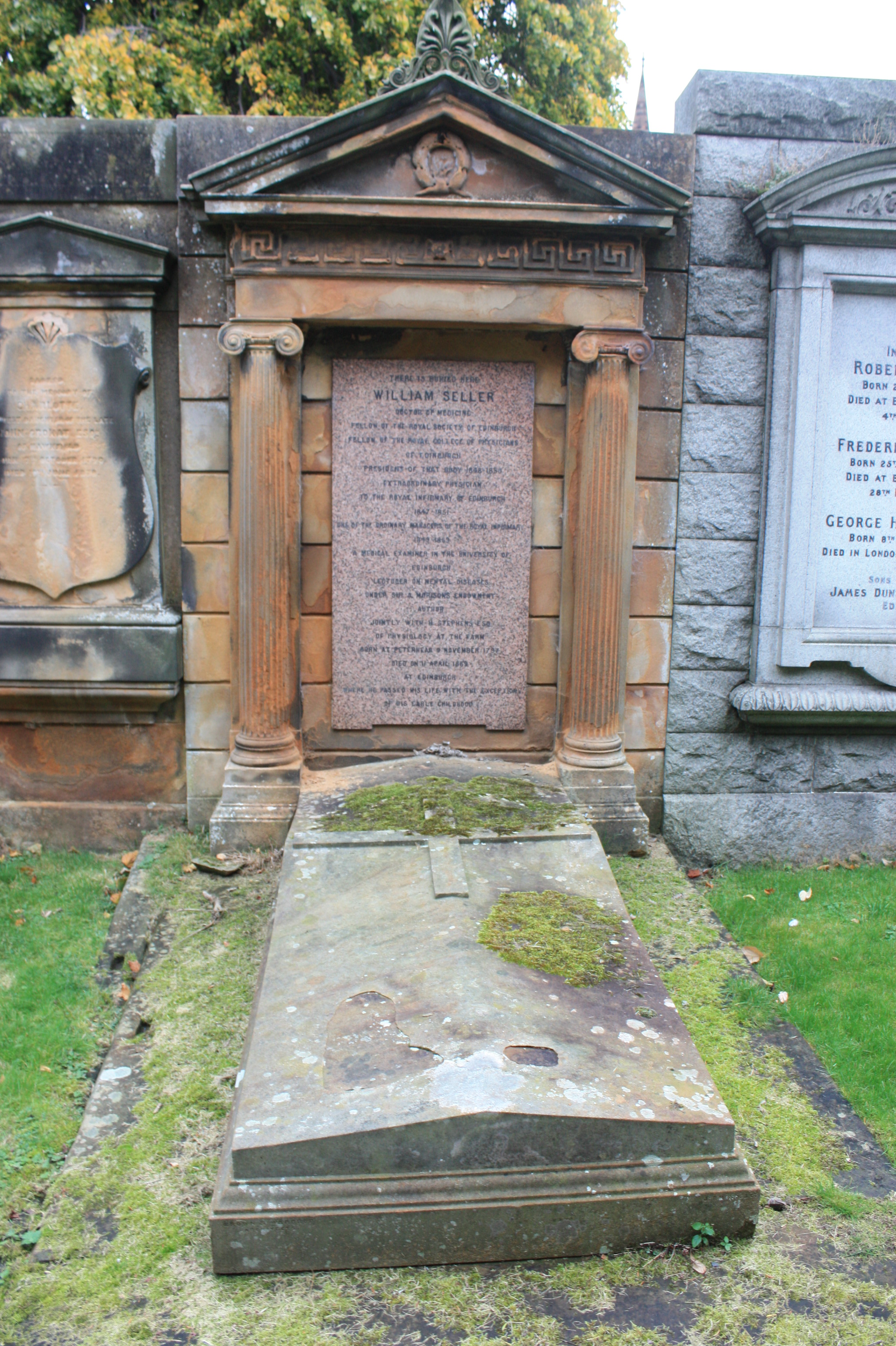
The grave of William Seller, Dean Cemetery, Edinburgh

He was born on 9 November 1797 in Peterhead in Aberdeenshire. His father appears to have died when he was young and he moved to Bailie Fyfe's Close on the Royal Mile in Edinburgh with his mother. He was educated in the High School in Edinburgh. He studied medicine at the University of Edinburgh, graduating with an MD in 1821. He then began lecturing in Materia Medica at the Extra-Mural School in Edinburgh. He was also a Physician both at the Edinburgh Royal Infirmary and at the Edinburgh Public Dispensary.

In 1830 he was living at Brown Square in Edinburgh.

In 1841 he was elected a member of the Aesculapian Club. In 1841 Seller was also elected a member of the Harveian Society of Edinburgh and served as President in 1853. In 1855 the Society confirmed on him the honorific title of "Doctor of Merriment" and he subsequently was one of its secretaries from 1858-1869.

In 1850 he was elected a Fellow of the Royal Society of Edinburgh, his proposer being Sir Robert Christison. He won the Society's Makdougall Brisbane Prize for the period 1860-62 for his memoir of Robert Whytt. Over and above his presidency of the Royal College of Physicians of Edinburgh, he was also President of the Medico-Chirurgical Society in 1854 and President of the Botanical Society of Edinburgh in 1851–52 and 1857–58.

He died at his home 18 Northumberland Street in Edinburgh's New Town on 11 April 1869 and is buried in Dean Cemetery in western Edinburgh. The grave lies on the south side of the wall dividing the original cemetery from the northern extension, close to its eastern end.

== Publications ==
- Tentamen Medicum Inaugurale, De Causis Quæ Hactenus Medicinæ Moram Fecerunt, Deque Spe Melioris Medicinæ (1821)
- Physiology at the Farm (1867)
