= Francis Darby Boyd =

Scottish physician (1866–1922)

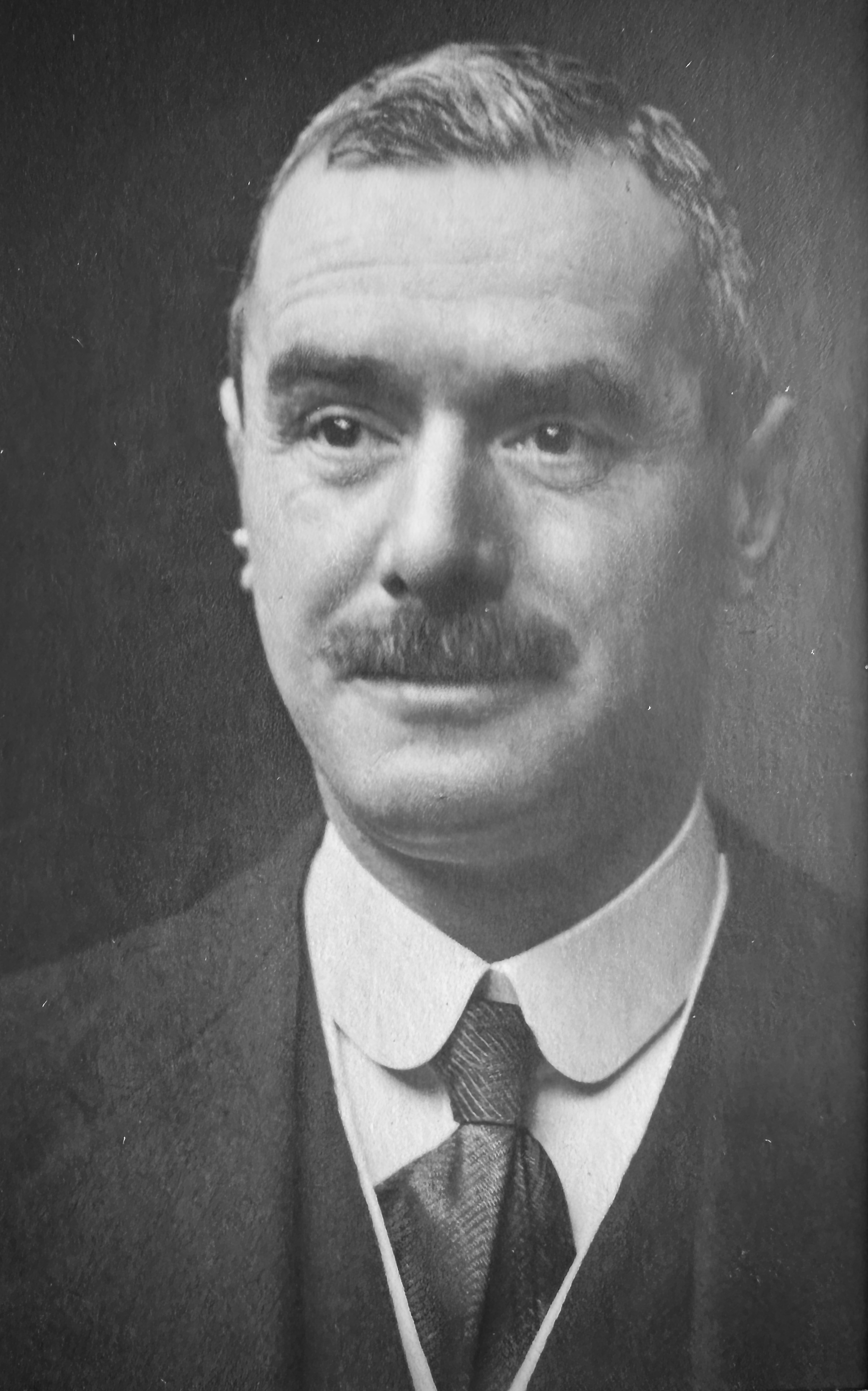
Francis Darby Boyd

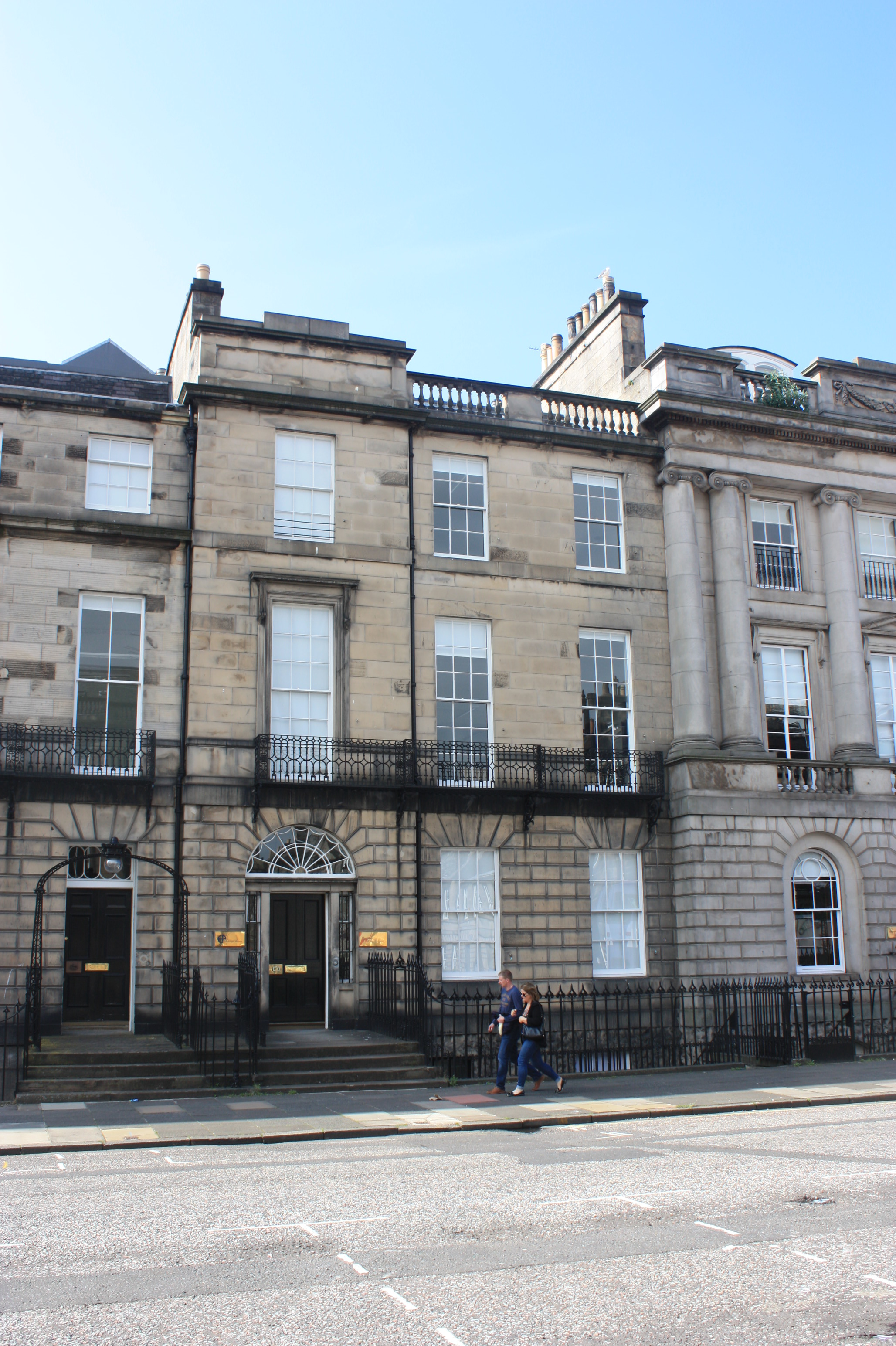
Boyd's birthplace at 27 Melville Street

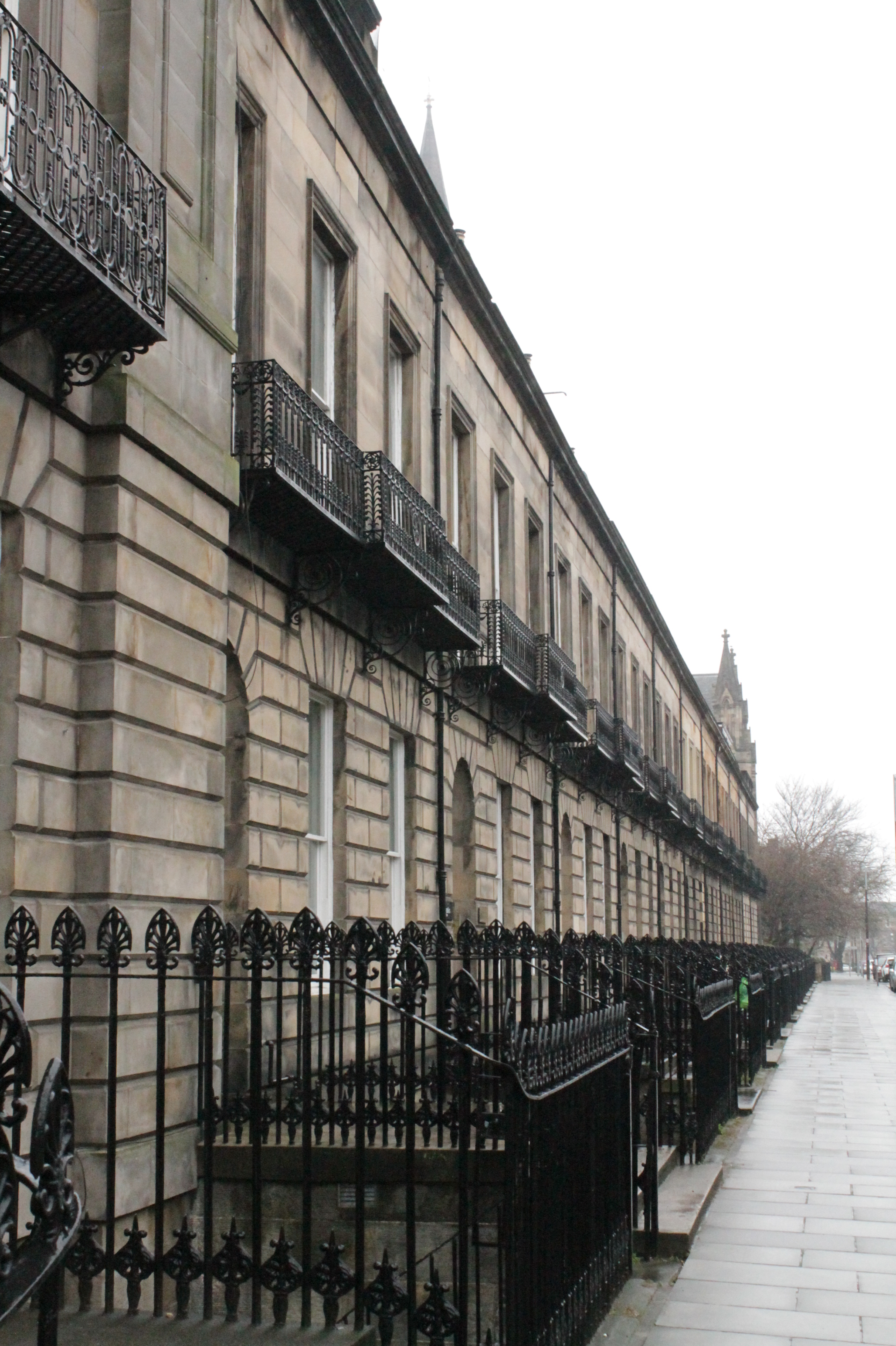
Manor Place, Edinburgh

Francis Darby Boyd CB CMG FRCPEd (19 October 1866–1922) was a Scottish physician, and Professor of Clinical Medicine at the University of Edinburgh.

== Life ==
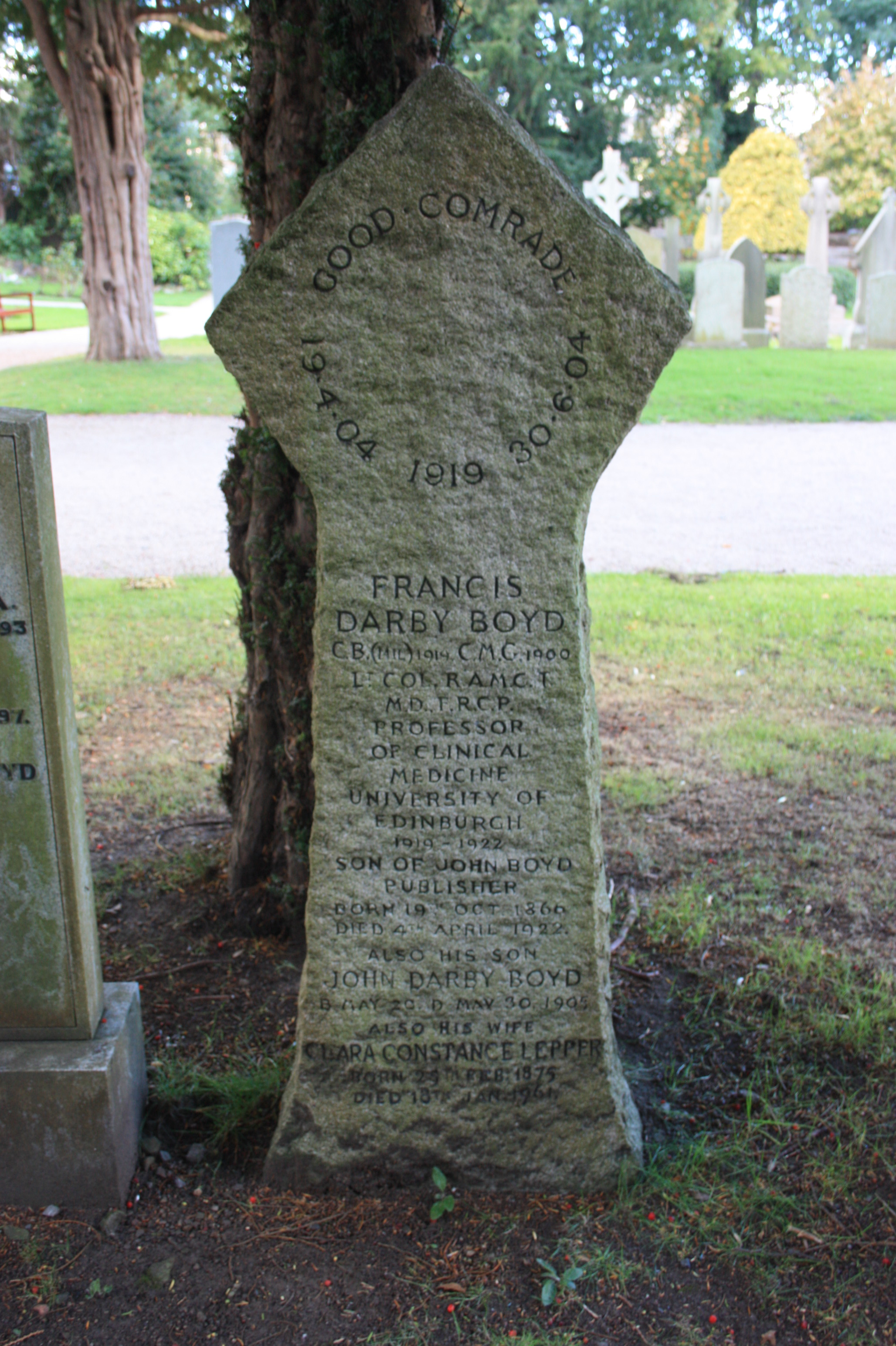
The grave of Francis Darby Boyd, Dean Cemetery

Boyd was born on 19 October 1866, at 27 Melville Street, Edinburgh. His aunt Mary was married to Francis Darby Syme, who is Boyd’s namesake.

He was educated at Edinburgh Academy going on to study medicine at the University of Edinburgh, graduating in 1888 with an MB ChB. He received his doctorate (MD) in 1893.

In 1899 he became assistant physician at Edinburgh Royal Infirmary also assisting at the Deaconess Hospital in the south of the city. At this time he was living at 6 Atholl Place in Edinburgh's West End.

He assisted during the Second Boer War, and was created a Commander of the Order of St Michael and St George in 1901 as a result. Then veering towards military medicine he joined the Royal Army Medical Corps in 1910 and served at the rank of Major. During the First World War he rose to the rank of Lieutenant Colonel and worked at Craigleith and Bangour. In 1919 he was created a Companion of the Order of the Bath for his military service.

In 1919 he left the Medical Corps to replace Professor William Russell as Professor of Clinical Medicine (known at the Moncrieff-Arnott Chair) at the University of Edinburgh.

In 1898 Boyd was elected a member of the Harveian Society of Edinburgh and was one of its secretaries from 1903-1922. He was a fellow of the Royal College of Physicians of Edinburgh. In 1921 he was elected a member of the Aesculapian Club.

He lived at 22 Manor Place in Edinburgh's West End.

He died on 4 April 1922 and is buried in Dean Cemetery in western Edinburgh. The grave lies on the main path close to the main entrance.

== Family ==
In 1904 he married Clara Constance Lepper (1875-1961), the daughter of Alfred J. A. Lepper. Together they had 2 daughters, Lesbia Laurence Meron Boyd (1907-1993) and the sculptor Mary Syme Boyd (1910-1997), and a son, John Boyd, who died in infancy in 1905.

== Publications ==
- Pellagra among the Turkish Prisoners of War (1920)
- Physical Diagnosis (reprinted 2018)
