= John Bell (surgeon) =

Scottish anatomist and surgeon (1763–1820)

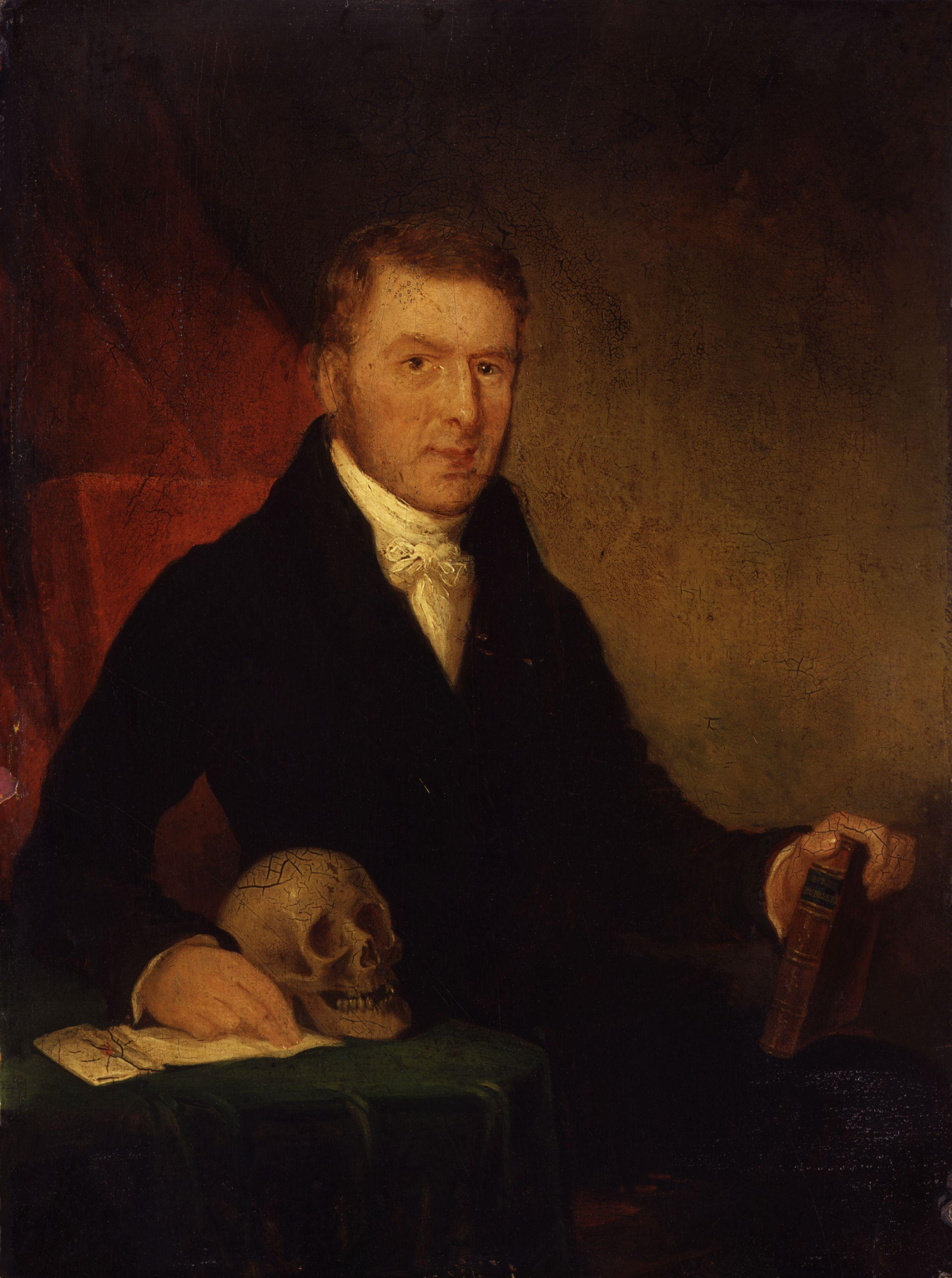
- John Bell
- Born: 12 May 1763; Edinburgh, Scotland
- Died: 15 April 1820 (aged 56); Rome
- Scientific career
- Fields: anatomist and surgery

John Bell (12 May 1763 – 15 April 1820) was a Scottish anatomist and surgeon.

== Life ==
Bell was born in Edinburgh, Scotland; an elder brother of Sir Charles Bell. After completing his professional education at Edinburgh, he carried on from 1790 in Surgeons' Square an anatomical lecture-theatre, where, in spite of much opposition, due partly to the unconservative character of his teaching, he attracted large audiences by his lectures, in which he was for a time assisted by his younger brother Charles. From 1793 to 1795, he published Discourses on the Nature and Cure of Wounds. He is considered, along with Pierre-Joseph Desault and John Hunter, to be a founder of the modern surgery of the vascular system.

In 1789 Bell was elected a member of the Harveian Society of Edinburgh and from 1795 to 1814 was one of its secretaries.

A man of compassion, Bell made many enemies because he was outspoken about the unnecessary pain and suffering inflicted by incompetent surgeons practicing in Scotland. In 1800 he became involved in an unfortunate controversy with James Gregory (1753–1821), the professor of medicine at Edinburgh. Gregory in 1800 attacked the system whereby the fellows of the Royal College of Surgeons of Edinburgh acted in rotation as surgeons at the Royal Infirmary, with the result that the younger fellows were excluded. Bell, who was among the number, composed an Answer for the Junior Members (1800), and ten years later published a collection of Letters on Professional Character and Manners, which he had addressed to Gregory. After his exclusion from the infirmary he ceased to lecture and devoted himself to study and practice.

Bell was also a talented artist, and was one of the few medical men to illustrate his own work. In 1816 he was injured by a fall from his horse and in the following year went to Italy for the benefit of his health. He died at Rome on 15 April 1820 and he is buried in the Protestant Cemetery, Rome, just behind the tomb of poet John Keats.

His works also included Principles of Surgery (1801), Anatomy of the Human Body, which went through several editions and was translated into German, and Observations on Italy, published by his widow in 1825.

== Sources ==
- Bettany, George Thomas (1885). "Bell, John (1763-1820)" . In Stephen, Leslie (ed.). Dictionary of National Biography. Vol. 4. London: Smith, Elder & Co.
- Baston, K. Grudzien. "Bell, John (1763–1820)". Oxford Dictionary of National Biography (online ed.). Oxford University Press. doi:10.1093/ref:odnb/2013. (Subscription, Wikipedia Library access or UK public library membership required.)
