= Robert Omond =

Scottish surgeon (1806–1881)

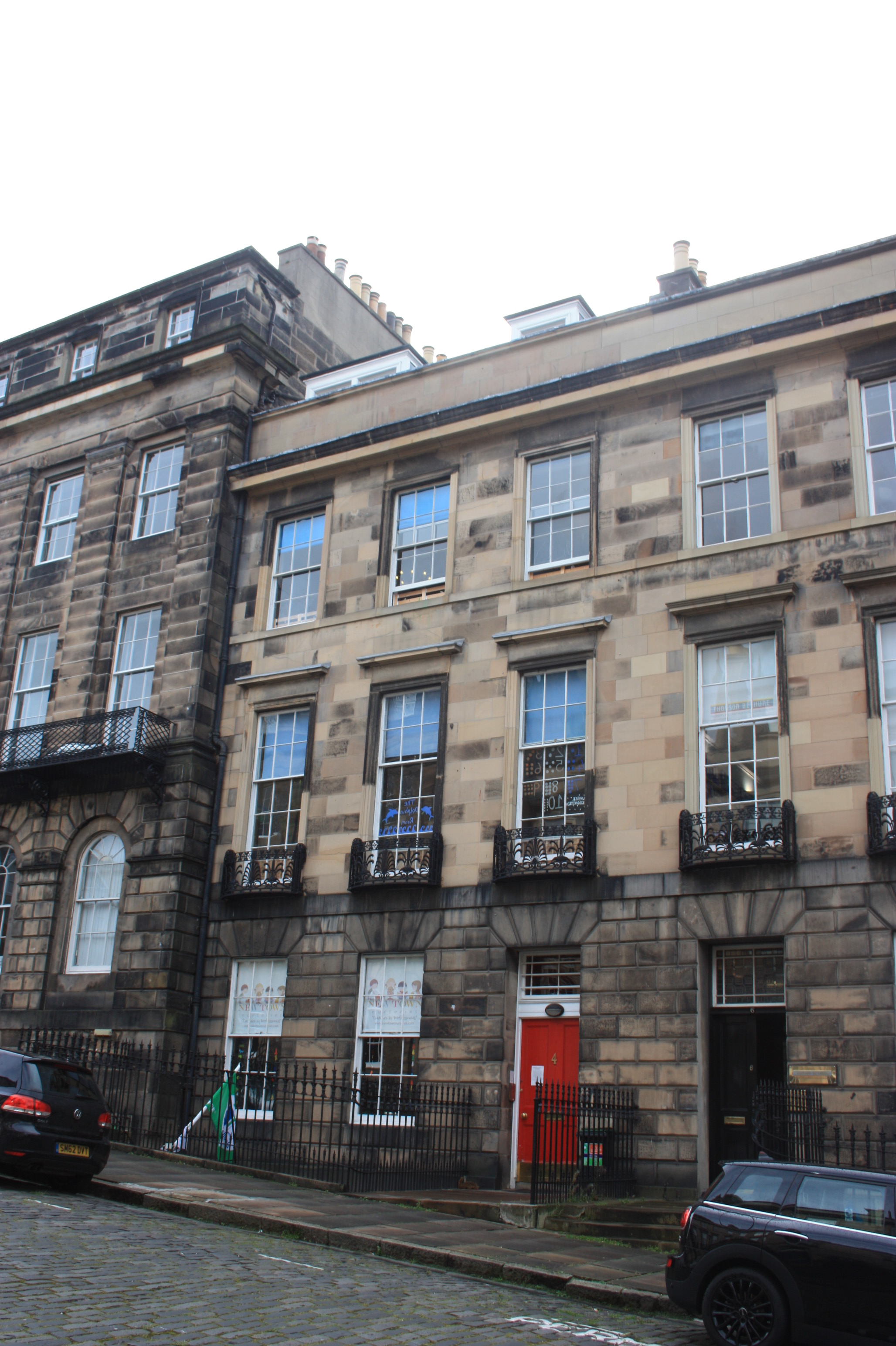
4 Forres Street, Edinburgh

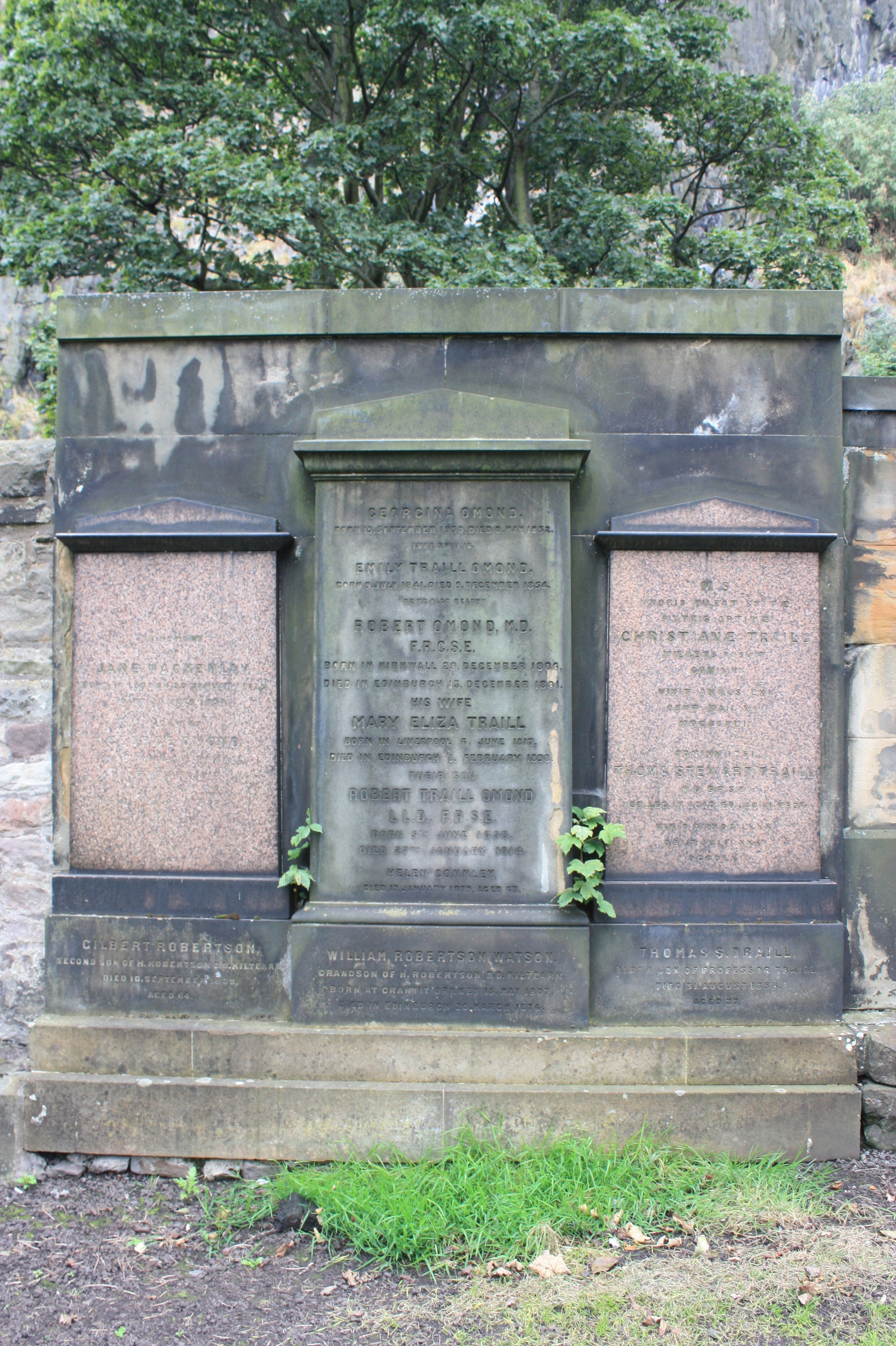
The grave of Robert Omond, St Cuthberts Churchyard, Edinburgh

Robert Omond, MD FRCSEd (1806–1881) was a 19th-century Scottish surgeon who served as president of the Royal College of Surgeons of Edinburgh 1857 to 1859.

== Life ==
He was born on 29 December 1806 in Kirkwall in Orkney, Scotland. He was the son of George Omand (sic) (1759–1813) and his wife Jane McKinlay (1775–1857).

He studied medicine at the University of Edinburgh Medical School where his teachers included John William Turner the professor of surgery. Omond qualified MD in 1832. He moved to 4 Forres Street, an affluent address in the Moray Estate in western Edinburgh.

In 1838 Omond was elected a member of the Harveian Society of Edinburgh and served as one of its secretaries from 1849 to 1871. He was President in 1874. In 1840 he was elected a member of the Aesculapian Club and served as Honorary Secretary from 1842 to 1877. He succeeded Andrew Wood as president of the Royal College of Surgeons of Edinburgh in 1857 and was himself succeeded by Andrew Douglas Maclagan in 1859. By this time he moved from his already prestigious address to 43 Charlotte Square, regarded as the best address in the city at that time.

He served as honorary secretary to the College in 1873.

He died on 13 December 1881, aged 74. He is buried in St Cuthberts Churchyard at the west end of Princes Street Gardens, and close to his home at Charlotte Square. The grave lies in the south-west on the outer boundary under Edinburgh Castle.

== Family ==
He married Mary Eliza Traill, daughter of Thomas Stewart Traill, also from Kirkwall, and possibly friends from their childhood.

They were parents to the geologist Robert Traill Omond.

His daughter Jane Omond (1839–1932) married the architect J. J. Stevenson, brother of Flora Stevenson and Louisa Stevenson.
