= Derrick Dunlop =

Scottish physician and pharmacologist

Professor Sir Derrick Dunlop FRSE FRCP FRCPE FRCSE

Professor of Therapeutics and Clinical Medicine, University of Edinburgh
- In office 1936–1962

Personal details
- Born: Derrick Melville Dunlop; 3 April 1902 Edinburgh, Scotland
- Died: 9 June 1980 (aged 78) Edinburgh, Scotland
- Occupation: Physician, pharmacologist

Sir Derrick Melville Dunlop (3 April 1902 – 9 June 1980) was a Scottish physician and pharmacologist in British medical administration and policy-making in the late 20th century. He established the Dunlop Committee which investigates the side-effects of new drugs in the UK.

== Life ==
Dunlop was born in Edinburgh on 3 April 1902 to Dr George Harry Melville Dunlop (1859–1916) of 20 Abercromby Place, an expert in child health and physician at the Edinburgh Sick Children’s Hospital, and Margaret Eliot Boog Scott. His father, a Major in the Royal Army Medical Corps and one of the oldest physicians to volunteer for active service, died of pneumonia at Étaples in France during the First World War.

Dunlop attended Edinburgh Academy from 1909 until 1919. He went up to Brasenose College, Oxford, and then the University of Edinburgh, graduating as MB ChB in 1926, followed by an MD awarded in 1927.

He worked briefly in London before returning to Edinburgh to work under Sir Robert Philip on pioneering work regarding the treatment of tuberculosis before taking up the Christison Chair in Therapeutics and Clinical Pharmacology aged 34, and also concurrently being Senior Physician at the Edinburgh Royal Infirmary. Dunlop tutored Joyce Baird, who went on to establish a Metabolic Unit and conduct laboratory and clinical research into diabetes and other endocrine disorders.

In 1929 Dunlop was elected a member of the Harveian Society of Edinburgh and was one of its secretaries from 1934-1956. He served as President in 1957. In 1937 he was elected a Fellow of the Royal Society of Edinburgh. His proposers were Sir Robert William Philip, Arthur Logan Turner, Edwin Bramwell, and Sir Sydney Alfred Smith. In 1946, Dunlop was elected to the Aesculapian Club of Edinburgh.

He was knighted by Queen Elizabeth II in 1960. In 1961 he was appointed official Physician to the Queen in Scotland, a post he held until 1965.

Dunlop retired from his professorship in 1962. In 1963 the British Government asked him to set up and chair a Committee following the thalidomide tragedy. This was called the Committee on the Safety of Medicines. In 1968 he became the first Chairman of the newly created Medicines Commission.

Sir Derrick died in Edinburgh on 9 June 1980. He lived most of his adult life at Bavelaw Castle near Balerno, to the south-west of Edinburgh, just south of Threipmuir Reservoir.

== Awards and academic positions ==
See Munk's Roll:

- Sims Commonwealth Travelling Professor (1957)
- Honorary degree from University of Birmingham
- Honorary degree from the National University of Ireland
- Honorary degree from the University of Bradford
- Honorary Fellow of the American College of Physicians
- Fellow of Brasenose College, Oxford
- Lumleian and Croonian Lecturer at the Royal College of Physicians
- Chairman of the British Pharmacopeia Commission 1954-58
- Junior President of the Royal Medical Society (1925)
- President of the Harveian Society of Edinburgh 1957
- Bisset Hawkins Medal of the Royal College of Physicians, 1971
- First Chairman of the Royal Medical Society Trust (1979)
- Honorary Fellowship in Dental Surgery
- Director of Winthrop Laboratories

== Family ==
A scion of the ancient Scottish family, Dunlop of Dunlop, in 1936 he married Marjorie Richardson, eldest daughter of Henry Edward Richardson WS. They had one son and one daughter. His granddaughter Dr Tessa Dunlop, married Vlad Pricopi, a Romanian and wrote the book To Romania With Love.

== Quotations ==
In relation to the thalidomide tragedy he said: "if experts are occasionally wrong they are less often wrong than non-experts ....nevertheless, we interfere with the prescribing doctor’s final freedom of decision at our peril in a free democracy".

== Publications ==
- The Textbook of Medical Treatment (1939), co-written with Sir Stanley Davidson and Sir John McNee.
- Clinical Chemistry in Practical Medicine (1954) was co-written with C P Stewart.
