= Richard Huie =

Scottish surgeon

Dr Richard Huie FRCSEd (16 August 1795 – 10 July 1867) was a 19th-century Scottish surgeon who served as President of the Royal College of Surgeons of Edinburgh for the period 1840 to 1842. An ardent Christian he was also a popular hymn-writer, with at least 29 hymns to his name.

== Life ==
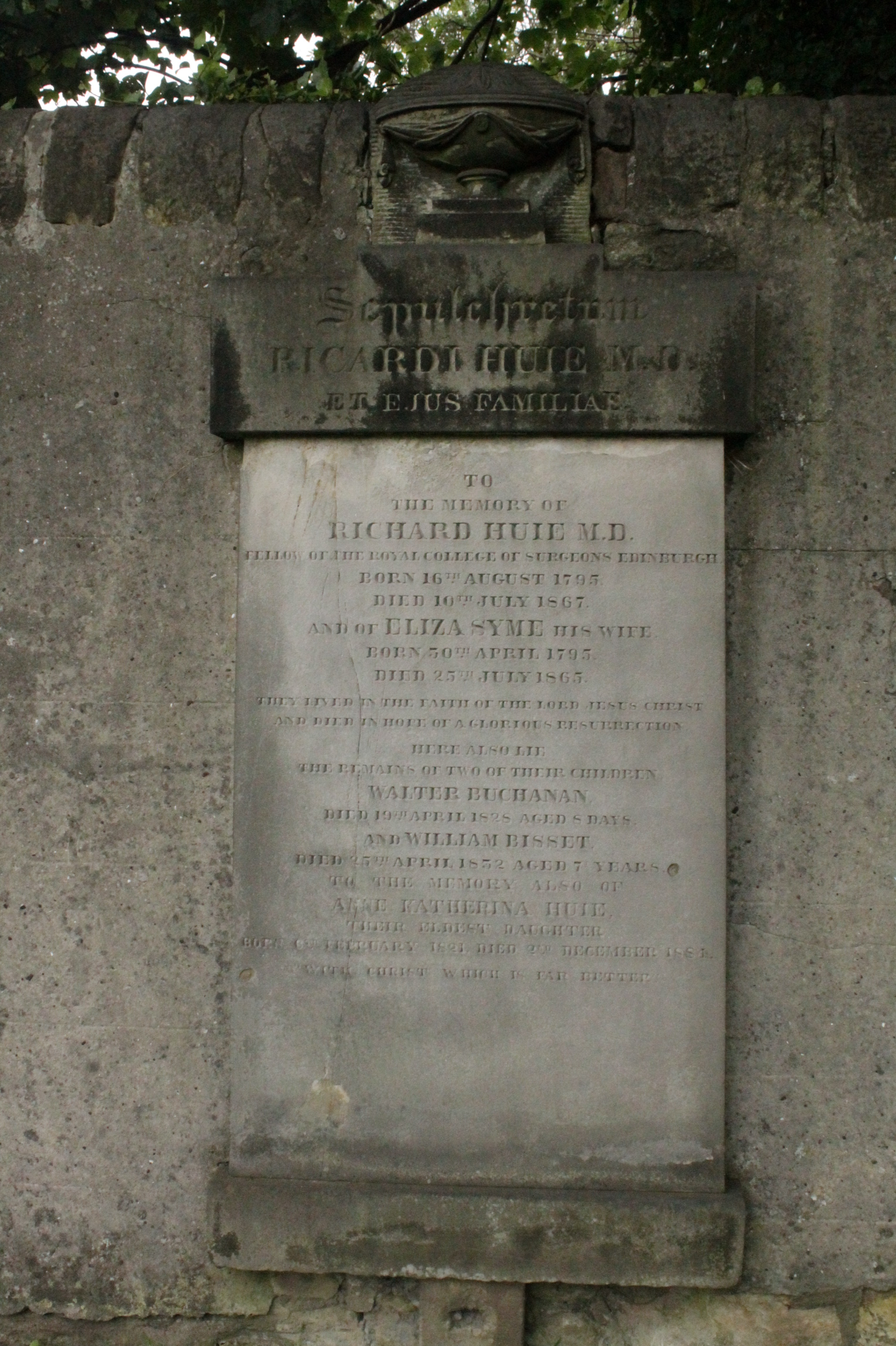
The grave of Richard Huie, East Preston Street Burial Ground, Edinburgh

He was born in Aberdeen on 16 August 1795, the son of Mary Gordon, and her husband James Huie. His father moved the family to Crosscauseway in Edinburgh's South side around 1809, to work for Excise. Huie was educated nearby, at the High School in Edinburgh then studied medicine at the University of Edinburgh before setting up practice in Dundee. Following his mother's death his father married Marjory Ziegler.

In 1822 he moved from Dundee to Edinburgh, living at 16 Nicolson Street, close to Surgeons Hall. By 1830 he had moved to a larger house at 8 George Square.

In 1823 he was elected a member of the Aesculapian Club and served as Honorary Secretary from 1827-1842. In 1824 Huie was elected a member of the Harveian Society of Edinburgh and served was President in 1828 and 1832. He also served as one of the secretaries of the society from 1828-1849. In 1840 he succeeded Dr Adam Hunter as President of the Royal College of Surgeons of Edinburgh. In 1842 he was succeeded in turn by Dr Andrew Fyfe.

In 1842 in his role as President, he wrote to the Poor Law Commission giving a medical view on the new laws.

He lived his final years at 8 George Square, Edinburgh.

He died on 10 July 1867 aged 71. He is buried in East Preston Street Burial Ground in south Edinburgh. The grave lies on the extreme western boundary wall.

== Family ==
His sister Mary Gordon Huie married Rev James Fettes, also a Free Church minister. His brother John Ziegler Huie (1822-1864) was a minister of the Free Church of Scotland who settled in Geelong in Victoria, Australia and died there.

In September 1818 he married Eliza Syme (1795–1865), daughter of Alexander Syme, a Dundee merchant. Together they had two daughters and five sons; Anne Katherina Huie (1821–1884), their eldest son Richard Huie was a children's author, their eldest daughter, Eliza Syme Huie, married George Hair Newall, and their son David Huie (1831–1919) was a prominent figure in the Royal Bank of Scotland.

== Publications ==
- The Family Hymn Book (1825)
- The Amethyst, a Christian annual co-written with Robert Kaye Greville (1831 onwards).
- Sacred Lyrics (1843)
