= John Bruce (surgeon) =

Scottish surgeon (1905–1975)

Sir John Bruce CBE FRSE FRCSEd
- Sir John Bruce. Detail of painting by Alan Sutherland
- Born: 6 March 1905; Dalkeith, Scotland
- Died: 30 December 1975 (aged 70); Edinburgh, Scotland
- Education: University of Edinburgh
- Occupation: Surgeon
- Known for: Foundation of the Journal of the Royal College of Surgeons of Edinburgh, Regius Chair of Clinical Surgery at the University of Edinburgh President of the Royal College of Surgeons of Edinburgh from 1957 to 1962
- Predecessor: Sir James Learmonth
- Spouse: Mary Whyte Craig

Sir John Bruce, CBE FRSE (6 March 1905 – 30 December 1975) was a Scottish surgeon who was Regius Professor of Clinical Surgery in the University of Edinburgh and President of the Royal College of Surgeons of Edinburgh.

== Early life ==
John Bruce was born in Dalkeith, Midlothian on 6 March 1905. He graduated MB ChB with honours from the University of Edinburgh Medical School in 1928. After resident appointments at the Royal Infirmary of Edinburgh and the Royal Hospital for Sick Children in Edinburgh, he worked in general practice in Grimsby while studying for the Fellowship of the Royal College of Surgeons of Edinburgh (FRCSEd), which he obtained in 1932. He was then appointed clinical tutor to Professor Sir John Fraser, Regius Professor of Clinical Surgery and in 1935 was appointed assistant surgeon to the Royal Infirmary with charge of the surgical outpatient department. During this time he ran, in partnership with his surgical colleague Ian Aird, a highly acclaimed lecture and tutorial course to prepare candidates for the Fellowship examination. His MD thesis on congenital dislocation of the hip was awarded the Syme medal.

== Service in Second World War ==
Bruce had joined the Territorial Army as an officer in 11th(2nd Scottish) General Hospital(TA). On the outbreak of war this was mobilised as 23 (Scottish) General Hospital (RAMC) with Bruce serving as a surgical specialist in the Royal Army Medical Corps (RAMC). The hospital unit joined the Norwegian Expeditionary Force in 1940. For his actions in the evacuation of the field hospital during the Allied retreat he was mentioned in despatches. After promotion he was posted as Surgeon to the 14th Army in South East Asia with the rank of Brigadier, serving first in South East Asia Command, and subsequently in Burma. During this campaign he was befriended by Field Marshal Sir William Slim, a friendship which they continued after the war. On demobilisation in 1945 he was appointed a CBE (Mil) and received the Territorial Decoration (TD).

== Surgical career ==
On return to Edinburgh he was appointed Surgeon to the Western General Hospital and in 1946 he was instrumental in founding the combined medical and surgical Gastrointestinal Unit in partnership with Dr Wilfred Card. The concept of combined patient care by physicians and surgeons was an innovative one at that time. Combined care was particularly applicable to two common gastrointestinal problems of the day, peptic ulcer and inflammatory bowel disease. His research interests also encompassed breast disease.

In 1955 he was the driving force behind the founding of the Journal of the Royal College of Surgeons of Edinburgh a publication which he continued to edit until his death.

He was appointed to the Regius Chair of Clinical Surgery at the University of Edinburgh in 1956, in succession to Sir James Learmonth.

His original papers covered many aspects of surgical research and he co-authored A Manual of Surgical Anatomy with his surgical colleague James Ross and the anatomist Robert Walmsley.

== Honours ==
In 1938 Bruce was elected a member of the Harveian Society of Edinburgh and served as one of its secretaries from 1950-1966. He served as President of the Society in 1967. In 1955, he was elected a member of the Aesculapian Club.

Bruce was knighted in 1963 and in that year was elected a Fellow of the Royal Society of Edinburgh (FRSE). He was Surgeon to Queen in Scotland from 1966 to 1975. He was President of the Royal College of Surgeons of Edinburgh from 1957 to 1962 and was president of the Association of Surgeons of Great Britain and Ireland, President of the British Cancer Council and President of the International Federation of Surgical Colleges and Associations. With Ian Aird and Dr William Hinton of New York he jointly founded The James IV Association of Surgeons and served as its President.

John Bruce married Mary Whyte Craig in 1935. They had no children. He died in Edinburgh on 30 December 1975.
