= Anthony Toft =

Anthony Douglas (Tony) Toft PRCPE CBE LVO (29 October 1944-) is a 20th-century Scottish physician, specialising in endocrinology and thyroid disease. He served as President of the Royal College of Physicians of Edinburgh from 1991 to 1994.

== Life ==
Toft was born on 29 October 1944, the son of Anne Laing and William Vincent Toft. He was educated at Perth Academy.

He moved to the South Side in Edinburgh in 1962 when he began his studies in medicine at the University of Edinburgh. He graduated with an MB ChB in 1969 and then, after practical training in Edinburgh hospitals, practised as a general practitioner on Islay and then Orkney. In 1971 he became a Ciba Research Fellow in Endocrinology.

From 1978 he was Consultant Physician at the Edinburgh Royal Infirmary.

In 1980 he was elected a member of the Harveian Society of Edinburgh and served as Medical Secretary from 1982-1994. He was President of the Society in 1995. In 1987 he was elected a member of the Aesculapian Club and served as Honorary Secretary from 2004-2014.

In 1991 he succeeded John Richmond as President of the Royal College of Physicians of Edinburgh and was succeeded in turn by John D. Cash in 1994. He was created a Commander of the Order of the British Empire by Queen Elizabeth II in 1995. He was President of the British Thyroid Association from 1996 to 2009.

He retired from the NHS in 2009 and was awarded the Royal Victorian Order (LVO) in the same year.

== Publications ==
- Understanding Thyroid Disorders
- Thyroid Hormone Replacement (2017)

== Artistic recognition ==
His portrait by Alexander Fraser (born 1950) is held by the Royal College of Physicians of Edinburgh.
