= Neil Douglas (physician) =

Scottish physician (1949–2020)

Sir Neil James Douglas (28 May 1949 – 23 August 2020) was a medical doctor and was president of the Royal College of Physicians of Edinburgh (RCPE) 2004–2010 and chairman of the Academy of Medical Royal Colleges (AoMRC) 2009–2012.

== Career ==
He was a professor of respiratory and sleep medicine at the University of Edinburgh and an honorary consultant physician at the Royal Infirmary of Edinburgh. He established the National Scottish Sleep Laboratory at the Edinburgh City Hospital.

In 1983 Douglas was elected a member of the Harveian Society of Edinburgh and served as Medical Secretary from 1995-2003. He was President of the Society in 2004.

In December 2003, he was announced as President-elect of the Royal College of Physicians of Edinburgh, taking up the post of president in March 2004. He was re-elected in December 2008. and held office until 2010. He was chairman of the Academy of Medical Royal Colleges 2009–2012.

When the Medical Training Application Service (MTAS) was set up in 2007- with multiple problems evident - he chaired the initial MTAS review group.

He was Chairman of the Founding Council of the Faculty of Medical Leadership and Management (FMLM).

On retirement, he was Professor of Respiratory and Sleep Medicine (Emeritus) at the University of Edinburgh.

== Death ==
Sir Neil Douglas died on 23 August 2020, aged 71.

== Awards and honours ==
In 2007, he was bestowed with an Honorary Doctor of Medicine by the University of St Andrews.

In the 2009 New Year Honours, he was made Knight Bachelor for services to Medicine.
