= List of presidents of the Royal College of Surgeons of Edinburgh =

This is a complete list of the presidents of the Royal College of Surgeons of Edinburgh. The Trade Guild of Edinburgh Barbers and Surgeons was incorporated by the granting of a 'Seal of Cause' in 1505 to become 'The Incorporation of Surgeons and Barbers of Edinburgh'. The incorporation was granted a royal charter by King George III in 1778, giving it the title of "The Royal College of Surgeons of the City of Edinburgh". Prior to 1778, the president was referred to as the deacon.

The president is normally elected in November and now serves for three years. The current president is Professor Rowan Parks.

== List of presidents ==
=== 16th century ===
Deacons

- 1535–36 Lancellot Barbour
- 1536–37 Anthony Brussat
- 1537–38 No record
- 1539–40 George Leithe
- 1540–42 No record
- 1543–55 William Quhite
- 1555–57 Alexander Bruce
- 1557–58 Nowie Brussat
- 1558–59 Alexander Bruce
- 1559–60 Patrick Lindesay
- 1560–62 Robert Hendersoun
- 1562–65 James Lindesay
- 1565–66 John Chalmer
- 1566–67 Nowie Brussat
- 1567–68 Alexander Bruce
- 1568–69 Nowie Brussat
- 1569–70 Alexander Bruce
- 1570 Alexander Bruce
- 1571–72 No record
- 1572–73 Robert Hendersoun
- 1573–74 Nowie Brussat
- 1574–78 Gilbert Primrose
- 1578–80 Robert Hendersoun
- 1580–83 Gilbert Primrose
- 1583–84 Robert Hendersoun
- 1584–86 Henrie Blyth
- 1586–87 James Craig
- 1587–88 James Henrysoun
- 1588–89 James Lindsay
- 1589–91 James Henrysoun
- 1591–92 James Craig
- 1592–94 Hendrie Lumisden
- 1594–95 James Rig
- 1595–96 John Naysmyth
- 1596–98 Hendrie Lumisden
- 1598–1600 Andro Scott

=== 17th century ===
- 1600–01 James Henrysoun
- 1601–00 Henrie Aikman
- 1602–03 Gilbert Primrose
- 1603–05 James Skaithmure
- 1605–06 Hendrie Lumisden/James Kinloch
- 1606–08 Andro Scott
- 1608–10 James Kinloch
- 1610–12 Henrie Aikman
- 1612–14 David Pringle
- 1614–16 James Henrysoun
- 1616–18 Andro Scott
- 1618–19 James Henrysoun
- 1619–20 James Kinloch
- 1620–21 James Brown/Andro Scott
- 1621–20 Andro Scott
- 1622–24 David Pringle
- 1624–26 Henry Aikman
- 1626–27 John Pringill
- 1627–29 Andro Scott
- 1629–31 Laurence Cockburne
- 1631–32 John Ker
- 1632–33 John Spang
- 1633–35 James Rig
- 1635–37 John Pringill
- 1637–39 David Douglas
- 1639–40 John Pringle
- 1640–41 David Douglas
- 1641–42 James Rig
- 1642–44 John Scott
- 1644–46 Alexander Pennycuik
- 1646–48 David Douglas
- 1648–51 James Borthwick
- 1651–52 David Kennedy
- 1652–55 William Burnet
- 1655–57 Thomas Kincaid
- 1657–59 James Cleilland
- 1659–61 James Borthwick
- 1661–63 William Burnet
- 1663–65 Walter Trumble
- 1665–67 Arthur Temple
- 1667–69 Thomas Carter
- 1669–71 Arthur Temple
- 1671–73 Samwell Cheislie
- 1673–75 John Jossie
- 1675–77 William Borthwick
- 1677–79 George Stirling
- 1679–81 James Nisbet
- 1681–83 William Borthwick
- 1683–84 David Turnbull
- 1684–85 David Pringle
- 1685–87 Thomas Edgar
- 1687–89 John Baillie
- 1689–91 George Stirling
- 1691–92 John Raynolds
- 1692–93 James Crawford
- 1693–95 Gideon Eliot
- 1695–97 Alexander Monteith
- 1697–99 Thomas Dunlop acts in place of Gideon Eliot who refuses to accept office
- 1699 Gideon Eliot
- 1699–1700 Alexander Monteith

=== 18th century ===
- 1701–02 Alexander Monteith acts in place of Robert Clerk who refuses to accept office
- 1702–04 James Hamilton
- 1704–06 Henry Hamilton
- 1706–08 John Mirrie
- 1708–10 Alexander Nesbet
- 1710–12 Henry Hamilton
- 1712–13 John Monro
- 1714–16 John Lauder
- 1716–18 John McGill
- 1718–20 John Lauder
- 1720–22 Robert Hope
- 1722–24 John Knox
- 1724–25 John Kirkwood
- 1725–26 John Kennedy
- 1726–28 John Kirkwood
- 1728–30 John Kennedy
- 1730–32 John Lauder
- 1732–34 John McGill
- 1734–36 John Kennedy
- 1736–37 John Lauder
- 1737–39 William Mitchel
- 1739–40 George Cunninghame
- 1740–42 Alexander Nesbet
- 1742–44 George Langlands
- 1744–46 George Lauder
- 1746–48 George Cunninghame
- 1748–50 Adam Drummond
- 1750–52 George Cunningham
- 1752–54 James Russell
- 1754–56 Robert Walker
- 1756–58 Thomas Young
- 1758–60 William Chalmer
- 1760–62 John Balfour
- 1762–64 Alexander Wood
- 1764–66 James Rae
- 1766–68 James Brodie
- 1768–70 Robert Smith
- 1770–72 David Wardrobe
- 1772–74 William Inglis
- 1774–76 Andrew Wood
- 1776–78 Alexander Hamilton

Presidents

- 1778–80 James Gibson
- 1780–82 William Chalmer
- 1782–84 William Inglis
- 1784–86 Thomas Hay
- 1786–88 Forrest Dewar
- 1788–90 Andrew Wardrop
- 1790–92 William Inglis
- 1792–94 Thomas Wood
- 1794–96 Thomas Hay
- 1796–98 James Russell
- 1798–1800 Andrew Wood

=== 19th century ===
- 1800–02 James Law
- 1802–04 John Bennet
- 1804–06 John Rae
- 1806–08 William Farquharson
- 1808–10 Andrew Inglis
- 1810–12 Alexander Gillespie
- 1812–14 James Law
- 1814–16 Sir William Newbigging
- 1816–18 James Bryce
- 1818–20 Alexander Gillespie
- 1820–22 John Henry Wishart
- 1822–24 William Wood
- 1824–26 David Hay
- 1826–28 David Maclagan
- 1828–30 William Wood, second term
- 1830–32 John Gairdner
- 1832–34 John Campbell
- 1834–36 William Brown
- 1836–38 George Ballingall
- 1838–40 Adam Hunter
- 1840–42 Richard Huie
- 1842–44 Andrew Fyfe
- 1844–46 James Simson
- 1846–48 Samuel Alexander Pagan
- 1848–49 John Argyll Robertson
- 1849–51 James Syme
- 1851–53 James Scarth Combe
- 1853–55 Archibald Inglis
- 1855–57 Andrew Wood
- 1857–59 Robert Omond
- 1859–61 Andrew Douglas Maclagan
- 1861–63 Patrick Small Newbigging
- 1863–65 Benjamin Bell
- 1865–67 James Dunsmure
- 1867–69 James Spence
- 1869–72 James Gillespie
- 1872–73 William Walker
- 1873–75 James Simson
- 1875–77 Sir Henry Littlejohn
- 1877–79 Sir Patrick Heron Watson
- 1879–82 Francis Brodie Imlach
- 1882–83 Sir William Turner
- 1883–84 John Smith
- 1885–87 Douglas Argyll Robertson
- 1887–89 Joseph Bell
- 1889–91 John Duncan
- 1891–93 Robert James Blair Cunynghame
- 1893–95 Peter Maclaren
- 1895–97 John Struthers
- 1897–99 John Chiene

=== 20th century ===
- 1899–1901 James Dunsmure
- 1901–03 Sir John Halliday Croom
- 1903–05 Sir Patrick Heron Watson
- 1905–07 Charles MacGillivray
- 1907–10 Joseph Montagu Cotterill
- 1910–12 Sir George Andreas Berry
- 1912–14 Francis Mitchell Caird
- 1914–17 Sir James Hodsdon
- 1917–19 Robert Johnston
- 1919–21 George Mackay
- 1921–23 Sir David Wallace
- 1923–25 Sir Harold Jalland Stiles
- 1925–27 Arthur Logan Turner
- 1927–29 Alexander Miles
- 1929–31 James Haig Ferguson
- 1931–33 John Dowden
- 1933–35 Arthur Henry Havens Sinclair
- 1935–37 Sir Henry Wade
- 1937–39 William James Stuart
- 1939–41 Harry Moss Traquair
- 1942–43 John William Struthers
- 1943–45 Robert William Johnstone
- 1945–47 James Methuen Graham
- 1947–49 Francis Jardine
- 1949–51 Walter Quarry Wood
- 1951–56 Sir Walter Mercer
- 1957–62 Sir John Bruce
- 1962–64 James Johnston Mason Brown
- 1964–67 George Ian Scott
- 1967–70 James Roderick Johnston Cameron
- 1970–73 Sir Donald Douglas
- 1973–76 James Alexander Ross
- 1976–79 Andrew Wilkinson
- 1979–82 Francis John Gillingham
- 1982–85 Sir James Fraser
- 1985–88 Thomas Jaffray McNair
- 1989–91 Geoffrey Duncan Chisholm
- 1991–94 Patrick Stewart Boulter
- 1994–97 Sir Robert Shields
- 1997–2000 Arnold George Dominic Maran

=== 21st century ===
- 2000–03 Sir John Temple
- 2003–06 John Allan Raymond Smith
- 2006–09 John D. Orr
- 2009–12 David Tolley
- 2012–15 Ian Ritchie
- 2015–18 Michael Lavell-Jones
- 2018–2022 Michael Griffin
- 2022–present Rowan Parks

== See also ==
- List of presidents of the Royal College of Physicians of Edinburgh
