= Gideon Eliot =

Historical Scottish surgeon

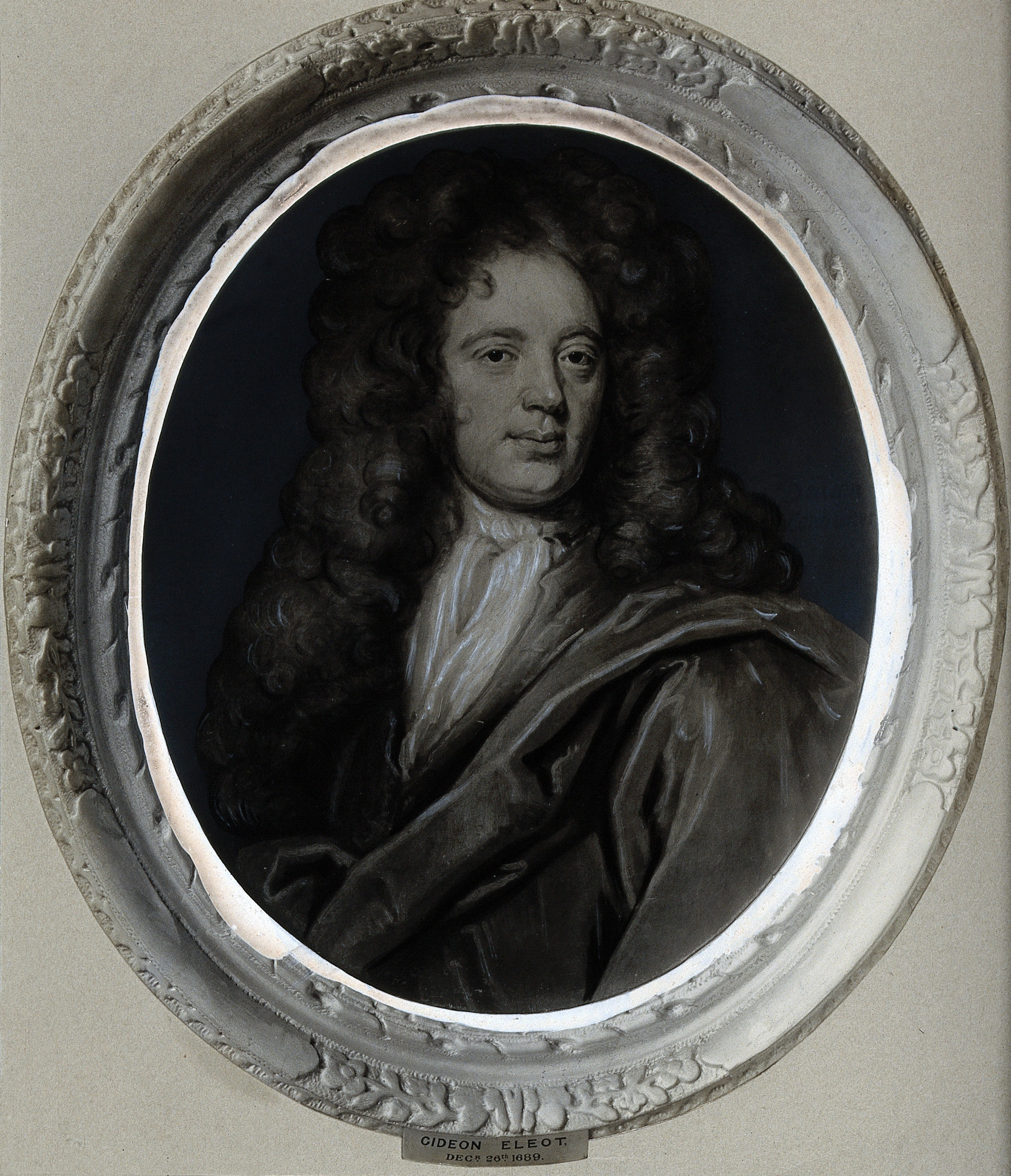
- Detail from portrait of Gideon Eliot by Sir John de Medina
- Born: 1664
- Died: 1713 (aged 48–49)
- Occupation: Surgeon
- Known for: Deacon Incorporation of Surgeons of Edinburgh

Gideon Eliot (1664–1713) of North Sintoun (Note: Historic Environment Scotland has records for a farmhouse named North Synton, but these contain no references to Gideon Eliot) in Roxburghshire was an Edinburgh surgeon. He served as surgeons to the 26th Regiment of Foot. He was elected Deacon (President) of the Incorporation (later Royal College) of Surgeons of Edinburgh on two occasions.

== Early life ==
Eliot was born in 1664, the son of Thomas Eliot of Beirlie. He was apprenticed to the surgeon George Stirling on 19 October 1681. As was usual his apprenticeship lasted five years after which he studied medicine at the University of Leiden in Holland, matriculating there in 1686.

== Military career ==
Eliot was the first surgeon to the 26th (Cameronian) Regiment of Foot which was raised in April 1689. The regiment was raised to fight the Jacobite forces under Graham of Claverhouse, Viscount Dundee, who opposed King William's accession to the throne of Great Britain and Ireland. In their first action, in August 1689, the Cameronians defeated Dundee's Jacobites at the Battle of Dunkeld, an action which took the impetus out of the Jacobite rising in Scotland. As surgeon to the Cameronians, Eliot would have attended the casualties at Dunkeld. He served with the Cameronians until 1692.

== Surgical career ==
Eliot was elected Freeman (Fellow) of the Incorporation of Surgeons of Edinburgh on 26 December 1689. He trained at least 2 surgical apprentices, Andrew Scot, who was apprenticed to him on 13 April 1692, and William Erskine of Seafield who was apprenticed 24 May 1699. Eliot was elected Deacon (President) of the Incorporation from 1693-1695, but when elected for a further term in 1697 he refused to accept the office. The Town Council minutes record: ‘The Council considering that Gideon Eliot chyrurgeon being chosen deacon of that Incorporation to serve for the year to come, And for severall reasons and causes moveing him hes refused to accept of his office, doe therefore decerne the said Gideon Eliot in ane unlaw of the sume of 300 merks and to be imprisoned or his goods poynded till he pay the samen and produce his burges ticket to the Council’. The threat of withdrawal of the Burgess ticket was a powerful deterrent, since it would deprive the individual of his livelihood. Thomas Dunlop was elected in his stead. Despite his refusal on this occasion, Eliot was elected Deacon again from 1699 to 1701.

In 1696 Eliot invested £500 sterling in The Company of Scotland Trading to Africa and the Indies, also called the Scottish Darien Company. Around one fifth of the total capital in Scotland was invested in the Company and its ill-fated Darien scheme resulted in the loss of all capital invested. Eliot was embroiled in further controversy in January 1699 when he was accused of harassment by Margaret Gibson, widow of the barber-surgeon James Keir. She alleged that he had unfairly brought about the dismissal of two barber apprentices working in her shop. The case dragged on for over two years until Eliot was summoned to appear before the "Lords of counsell" on 5 November 1701, but no action appears to have been taken against him.

In 1695, Eliot was consulted regarding the health of the Earl of Home who had been placed under arrest at his home The Hirsel in Berwickshire. Eliot and Sir Thomas Burnet, the physician to the King, were asked by the Council of King William to report on whether the Earl's health was compatible with his transfer to Edinburgh Castle. For this journey to the Hirsel, Eliot was paid 100 merks while the physician who accompanied him was paid 200 merks - about ten pounds sterling.

== Civic offices ==
Eliot was appointed to the Treasurer's Committee of the Edinburgh Town Council in 1694. The following year he was appointed as a visitor to the physic garden of the Incorporation of Surgeons, which had been established in 1664. Three other visitors were appointed, his fellow surgeon Alexander Monteath and the physicians Sir Robert Sibbald and Sir Thomas Burnet. In 1701, the Edinburgh Town Council awarded him £949-6s Scots ‘for performing of cures and furnishing of droges and medicaments be him to the souldiers of the Town's guard at the late rable and dreadfull fyre and other occasions’.

Eliot died in 1713.
