= Tom McNair (surgeon) =

Scottish surgeon (1927–1994)

Thomas Jaffray McNair
- detail of painting by Alan Sutherland
- Born: 1 March 1927; Edinburgh, Scotland
- Died: 27 April 1994 (aged 67); Edinburgh, Scotland
- Education: George Watson's College University of Edinburgh
- Occupation: General surgeon
- Known for: Surgeon to the Queen in Scotland
- Medical career
- Institutions: Chalmers Hospital Royal Infirmary of Edinburgh
- Notable works: Hamilton Bailey's Emergency Surgery

Thomas Jaffrey McNair (1 March 1927 – 27 April 1994) CBE, FRCS, FRCSEd was a Scottish surgeon who acted as editor of Emergency Surgery, one of the most widely read textbooks on the subject. Originally a general surgeon, in the latter part of his career he devoted his practice increasingly to colo-rectal surgery. He was Surgeon to the Queen in Scotland and served as president of the Royal College of Surgeons of Edinburgh.

== Early life and education ==
He was born in Edinburgh, the son of David MacMillan McNair, a mining engineer, and his wife Helen Jackson McNair, (née Rae). After schooling at George Watson's College he entered the University of Edinburgh Medical School in 1944, winning the John Aitken Carlyle Bursar in his first year and graduating MB ChB in 1949. He was house surgeon to Sir James Learmonth and then worked in West Africa as doctor to a mining company gaining his first experience of emergency surgery. His National Service was as a medical officer in the Royal Air Force. On return to Edinburgh he worked as a junior anaesthetist at the Western General Hospital before continuing surgical training as a surgical registrar at Edinburgh Royal Infirmary. He became a Fellow of the Royal College of Surgeons of Edinburgh in 1955 and of the Royal College of Surgeons of England the following year.

== Surgical career ==
In 1958 he became senior registrar to the Regius Professor of Clinical Surgery, Sir John Bruce. He was invited at this stage to become editor of the popular textbook Emergency Surgery, previously written by Henry Hamilton Bailey. McNair edited the 8th and 9th editions. In 1958 he was also elected a member of the Harveian Society of Edinburgh.

He was awarded the MD degree for his thesis "On observations on visceral pain, with special reference to the pain originating in the testis" in 1960. He then spent a year in Chicago, training with Dr Warren H Cole at the Surgery Department of the University of Illinois before being appointed consultant surgeon to the Eastern General Hospital, Edinburgh. His final consultant appointment was a joint appointment as surgeon in Chalmers Hospital and the Edinburgh Royal Infirmary. where he became consultant in administrative charge of one of the general surgical units. In 1964 he was instrumental in establishing the Accident and Emergency Department in the Royal Infirmary. In the early part of his career he was a general surgeon but latterly he specialised increasingly in colo-rectal surgery.

He became renowned for a surgical technique that was methodical, precise and painstakingly meticulous. His reputation was such that he came to be regarded as the local "surgeons' surgeon."

His surgical expertise and distinction was recognised in 1977 when he was appointed Surgeon to The Queen in Scotland.

McNair was elected vice-president of the Royal College of Surgeons of Edinburgh in 1980 and president of the college in 1985.

He had long been an advocate of reform of the FRCS examinations and those reforms came to fruition during his presidency. For his contributions to examination reform he was awarded the silver medal of the Royal College of Surgeons of England.

Further recognition came with his appointment in 1988 as a Commander of the Order of the British Empire (CBE).

== Selected publications ==
Plastic bags for storing and transfusing blood. Lancet, v.1, 1958, pp. 294‐296.

Intestinal pseudo‐obstruction. Journal of the Royal College of Surgeons of Edinburgh, v.3, 1958, pp. 206‐217.

The results of haemorrhoidectomy. Scottish Medical Journal, v.4, 1959, pp. 571‐574.

The local complications of intravenous therapy. Lancet, v.2, 1959, pp. 365‐368.

Axillary lymph‐nodes in patients without breast carcinoma. Lancet, v.1, 1960, pp. 713‐715.

Excretion urography in the acute abdomen. Journal of the Royal College of Surgeons of Edinburgh, v.8, 1962, pp. 70‐75.

Antitumor action of several new Piperazine derivatives compared to certain standard anticancer agents. Journal of Surgical Research, v.3, 1963, pp. 130‐136.

Availability of surgical patients for clinical teaching: an Edinburgh survey. Lancet, v.2, 1964, pp. 463 + 464.

Death following gallbladder surgery. Journal of the Royal College of Surgeons of Edinburgh, v.12, 1967, pp. 139‐148.

Resuscitation room survey. Scottish Medical Journal, v.14, 1969, pp. 29‐35.

The Waltman Waters syndrome. Journal of the Royal College of Surgeons of Edinburgh, v.17, 1972, pp. 185‐189.

A study of cholecystectomy. Surgery, Gynecology & Obstetrics, v.138, 1974, pp.752754.

The operative cholangiogram: its interpretation, accuracy and value in association with cholecystectomy. Annals of Surgery, v.80, 1974, pp. 902‐906.

Intermittent compression for lymphoedema of arm. Clinical Oncology, v.2, 1976, pp. 339‐342.

Abdomino‐perineal resection – a 15‐year review. Clinical Oncology, v.6, 1980, pp. 231‐236. .

Colonoscopy in the detection of polyps of the large bowel. Journal of the Royal College of Surgeons of Edinburgh, v.26, 1981, pp. 150‐152.

Polydioxanone: a new synthetic absorbable suture. Journal of the Royal College of Surgeons of Edinburgh, v.26, 1981, pp.170‐172.

A comparison of the use of povidone‐iodine and chlorhexidine in the prophylaxis of postoperative wound infection. Journal of Wound Infection, v.3, 1982, pp. 55‐63.

== Personal life and death ==
On 21 April 1951 he married Sybil Wood a consultant pathologist. Their son Alastair, became a lawyer and their daughter, Sally, a BBC television journalist.

He died on 27 April 1994.
