= Walter Quarry Wood =

Scottish surgeon and art collector

- Born: 9 September 1888; Edinburgh, Scotland
- Died: 28 February 1958 (aged 69); Edinburgh, Scotland
- Education: University of Edinburgh
- Occupation: General surgeon
- Known for: President Royal College of Surgeons of Edinburgh
- Medical career
- Institutions: Royal Infirmary of Edinburgh

Walter Quarry Wood MD, ChM, FRCSEd (9 September 1888 – 28 February 1958) was a Scottish surgeon who became known as a collector of Scottish Colourists. He worked at the Royal Infirmary of Edinburgh (RIE) and was president of the Royal College of Surgeons of Edinburgh.

== Early life ==
Walter Quarry Wood, FRCSEd was born in St Boswalls in the Scottish Borders in 1888, one of seven sons of William Wood. He studied medicine at the University of Edinburgh Medical School, qualifying MB, ChB in 1911.

== Surgical career ==
He was house surgeon at the RIE to Professor Francis Caird, the Regius professor of clinical surgery. In 1914 he became a Fellow of the Royal College of Surgeons of Edinburgh. During the First World War he served as an officer in the Royal Army Medical Corps (RAMC). In 1916 he graduated Doctor of Medicine (MD) and was awarded a gold medal for his thesis. He qualified Master of Surgery (Ch.M.) in 1922, again receiving a gold medal for the thesis. After the war he was appointed assistant surgeon to the Royal Infirmary of Edinburgh and served on the staff of the hospital for 42 years, becoming surgeon in charge of wards in 1939. For some years he was also assistant surgeon to Chalmers Hospital, Edinburgh and was consultant surgeon to the Scottish Border hospitals. In addition to surgical teaching he continued to teach anatomy in the university department and carried out research into the embryology of the endocrine glands. In 1947, he was elected to the Aesculapian Club of Edinburgh. He was elected president of the Royal College of Surgeons of Edinburgh in 1949 and president of the Edinburgh Medico-Chirurgical Society in 1955. He was also elected a member of the Harveian Society of Edinburgh.

== The Wood Collection of Scottish Colourists ==
Between 1920 and 1940 Quarry Wood collected paintings by the Scottish colourists, advised by Duncan Macdonald of the dealers Alex Reid and Lefevre. In 2016 the collection came onto the market and was described as "one of the most important single groups of Colourist paintings to come on to the market in recent years." The collection included paintings by FCB Cadell, with whom the Wood family had a personal connection through his father, a surgeon, Francis Cadell FRCSEd (1844-1909). There were also paintings by SJ Peploe and Leslie Hunter. The thirteen lots sold for a total of £1.3 million.

== Family ==
In 1919 in Edinburgh he married Elizabeth Joyce Alexander, daughter of Dr Alexander Alexander (1849-1894) of Wick, Caithness. They had one daughter, Elizabeth, a doctor. He died in Edinburgh in 1958.
