= John William Struthers =

- Born: 3 May 1874
- Died: 15 August 1953 (aged 79); Gullane, Scotland
- Education: Loretto School; University of Edinburgh
- Occupation: General surgeon
- Known for: President Royal College of Surgeons of Edinburgh
- Medical career
- Institutions: Royal Infirmary of Edinburgh
- Sub-specialties: General surgery

John William Struthers FRCSEd (3 May 1874 – 15 August 1953) was a Scottish surgeon. During World War I he served as a major in the Royal Army Medical Corps and was awarded the Serbian Order of St Sava. During his career in Edinburgh he became an early user of local anaesthetic techniques in general surgery and wrote a highly regarded booklet on the topic. He was elected President of the Royal College of Surgeons of Edinburgh (RCSEd) from 1941 to 1943.

== Early life ==
Struthers was born in 1874 in Oldmachar, Aberdeen. He was the son of the son of Sir John Struthers, Regius Professor of Anatomy at the University of Aberdeen and a former President of the Royal College of Surgeons of Edinburgh (RCSEd). His mother Christina (née Alexander) was the daughter of James Alexander (1795–1863), a surgeon in Wooler, England. He was educated at Loretto School in Musselburgh. He remained close to the school throughout his life, serving as a governor for several years. He studied medicine at the University of Edinburgh Medical School, qualifying MB ChB in 1897.

== Surgical career ==
He was appointed house physician in the Royal Infirmary of Edinburgh (RIE) to Dr Byrom Bramwell and house surgeon at Leith Hospital to Mr Alexander Miles. He went on to act as anatomy demonstrator for four years under Sir William Turner and Prof. D.J. Cunningham before qualifying as a Fellow of the Royal College of Surgeons of Edinburgh in 1899. After appointment as clinical tutor in the RIE in 1908 he became assistant surgeon to the hospital. In 1906 he was elected a member of the Harveian Society of Edinburgh.

During World War I he served initially with the Red Cross at Rouen, France. and was then posted as a major in the Royal Army Medical Corps (RAMC) to the 42nd General Hospital at Salonica where he was in charge of the surgical division of the hospital. Here he served alongside C M Grieve, later known as the poet Hugh MacDiarmid, who was Sergeant-Caterer of the RAMC Officer’s Mess. For his service to Serbian troops in this campaign Struthers was awarded the Order of St Sava by the Serbian government.

After the war he returned to Edinburgh and resumed duties in the RIE being promoted to full surgeon in 1924. From 1925 he was consulting surgeon at Leith Hospital.

His specialist interests included the use of local anaesthesia in general surgery and he published a monograph on the subject in 1906. Notes on local anaesthesia in general surgery was described in the Lancet as "...for long the best source of information on the subject in English." Struthers noted that much of the research on the subject had taken place in the US, France and Germany and that its introduction into clinical practice into. Britain had been relatively slow. Struthers described techniques of infiltration, regional and spinal anaesthesia and how these could be used for major surgical procedures. Wildsmith suggested that it was Struthers' work that led to the development of spinal hypotensive anaesthesia by Gillies and Griffiths.

With the pathologist James Walker Dawson, Struthers conducted original work on osteitis fibrosa cystica. Their work was considered of such importance that an entire issue of the Edinburgh Medical Journal in 1923 was devoted to the subject. In this they related the condition to a parathyroid adenoma. Struthers later undertook with Dr H. E. Seiler, the Edinburgh Medical Officer of Health, an extensive survey of the hospital accommodation in southeast Scotland, on behalf of the Department of Health, in preparation for the National Health Service.

Throughout his working life he was associated with the RCSEd serving as secretary and treasurer from 1927 to 1941. He was elected President of the RCSEd in 1941. In 1932 he was elected a member of the Aesculapian Club.

== Awards and honours ==
In recognition of his service to the University of Edinburgh he was made a Member of the Faculty and later of the Senatus. The university conferred the honorary degree of LL.D. in 1946.

== Family ==
Struthers came from a family with strong medical connections. His father Sir John Struthers, was Regius Professor of Anatomy at the University of Aberdeen. Two of his uncles were doctors, Alexander Struthers who died at Scutari Hospital in Istanbul during the Crimea campaign and James Struthers (1821–1891), a physician who also worked at Leith Hospital.

He married Anna Leyde in Edinburgh in 1901.

Struthers died at his home in Gullane, Scotland in 1953.

== Selected publications ==
Notes on local anaesthesia in general surgery. (1906) Edinburgh: Wm. Green & Sons

Generalised Osteitis Fibrosa. Edinburgh Medical Journal. (1923) 30(10): 421–564 (with James W Dawson)
