= List of acts of the Parliament of Scotland from 1669 =

This is a list of acts of the Parliament of Scotland for the year 1669.

It lists acts of Parliament of the old Parliament of Scotland, that was merged with the old Parliament of England to form the Parliament of Great Britain, by the Union with England Act 1707 (c. 7).

For other years, see list of acts of the Parliament of Scotland. For the period after 1707, see list of acts of the Parliament of Great Britain.

== 1669 ==
The 1st session of the 2nd parliament of Charles II, held in Edinburgh from 19 October 1669.

Short title, or popular name	Citation	Royal assent
Long title
Election of Commissioners Act 1669 (repealed)	1669 c. 1 (Note: This is the citation in the Record Edition.) — (Note: This act is not listed in the Duodecimal Edition.)	26 October 1669
Act anent the election of Commissioners from Shires. Act regarding the election of Commissioners from Shires. (Repealed by Statute Law Revision (Scotland) Act 1906 (6 Edw. 7. c. 38))
King's Supremacy Act 1669 (repealed)	1669 c. 2; 1669 c. 1 (Note: This is the citation in the Duodecimal Edition.)	26 November 1669
Act asserting his Majesties Supremacie over all persons and in all causes Ecclesiasticall. Act asserting his Majesty's Supremacy over all persons, and in all causes Ecclesiastical. (Repealed by Statute Law Repeal Act 1690 (c. 1))
Militia Act 1669 (repealed)	1669 c. 3; 1669 c. 2	26 November 1669
Act concerning the Militia. Act concerning the Militia. (Repealed by Statute Law Revision (Scotland) Act 1906 (6 Edw. 7. c. 38))
Registration Act 1669 (repealed)	1669 c. 4; 1669 c. 3	26 November 1669
Act for registration of instruments of resignation ad remanentiam. Act for registration of instruments of resignation ad remanentiam. (Repealed by Statute Law Revision (Scotland) Act 1906 (6 Edw. 7. c. 38))
Poinding Act 1669 (repealed)	1669 c. 5; 1669 c. 4	26 November 1669
Act concerning poinding befor the days of the charge expyre. Act concerning poinding before the days of the charge expire. (Repealed by Debtors (Scotland) Act 1987 (c. 18))
Ministers Act 1669 (repealed)	1669 c. 6; 1669 c. 5	30 November 1669
Act for the security of the persons of Ministers. Act for the security of the persons of Ministers. (Repealed by Statute Law Revision (Scotland) Act 1906 (6 Edw. 7. c. 38))
Benefices and Stipends Act 1669 (repealed)	1669 c. 7; 1669 c. 6	30 November 1669
Act for the ordering of Suspensions of the Benefices and Stipends of the Clergy. Act for the ordering of Suspensions of the Benefices and Stipends of the Clergy. (Repealed by Statute Law Revision (Scotland) Act 1906 (6 Edw. 7. c. 38))
Not public and general	1669 c. 8 —	3 December 1669
Act in favour of Sir James Dalrymple of Stair (Note: James Dalrymple, 1st Viscount of Stair.) for a weekly mercat and two yearly fairs at the kirk of Glenluce. Act in favour of Sir James Dalrymple of Stair for a weekly market and two fairs at the church of Glenluce.
Not public and general	1669 c. 9 —	3 December 1669
Act in favours of Leivt Gen. William Drumond (Note: William Drummond, 1st Viscount Strathallan.) for a fair and mercat at Dumblane. Act in favour of Lt. Gen. William Drummond, for a fair and market at Dunblane.
Not public and general	1669 c. 10 —	3 December 1669
Act in favours of the burgh of Aberdein continewing the imposition for repairing the calsay at Cowiemonth. Act in favour of the burgh of Aberdeen, continuing the imposition for repairing the causeway at Cowiemonth.
Not public and general	1669 c. 11 —	3 December 1669
Act in favors of William Lockhart of Carstairs for three fairs yeerlie at the town of Carstairs. Act in favour of William Lockhart of Carstairs, for three fairs yearly at Carstairs.
Naturalization Act 1669 (repealed)	1669 c. 12; 1669 c. 7	8 December 1669
Act for Naturalization of Strangers. Act for the Naturalization of Strangers. (Repealed by Statute Law Revision (Scotland) Act 1906 (6 Edw. 7. c. 38))
Bullion Act 1669 (repealed)	1669 c. 13; 1669 c. 8	8 December 1669
Act concerning the Bullion. Act concerning Bullion. (Repealed by Supply (No. 5) Act 1686 (c. 38))
Prescription Act 1669 (repealed)	1669 c. 14; 1669 c. 9	8 December 1669
Act concerning Prescriptions. Act concerning Prescriptions. (Repealed by Prescription and Limitation (Scotland) Act 1973 (c. 52))
Interruptions Act 1669 (repealed)	1669 c. 15; 1669 c. 10	8 December 1669
Act concerning Interruptions. Act concerning Interruptions. (Repealed by Prescription and Limitation (Scotland) Act 1973 (c. 52))
Not public and general	1669 c. 16 —	8 December 1669
Act in favours of William Earl of Dundonnald (Note: William Cochrane, 1st Earl of Dundonald.) for fairs and mercats at Wchiltrie Smiddiehill of Paisley and Kilmaranoch. Act in favour of William, Earl of Dundonald, for fairs and markets at Ochiltree, Smiddiehill of Paisley and Kilmarnock.
Rebels Act 1669 (repealed)	1669 c. 17; 1669 c. 11	15 December 1669
Act concerning the forfeiture of persons in the late Rebellion. Act concerning the forfeiture of persons in the late Rebellion. (Repealed by Statute Law Revision (Scotland) Act 1906 (6 Edw. 7. c. 38))
Excise and Customs Act 1669 (repealed)	1669 c. 18; 1669 c. 11	15 December 1669
Act concerning the Excise and Customes. Act concerning the Excise and Customs. (Repealed by Statute Law Revision (Scotland) Act 1906 (6 Edw. 7. c. 38))
Orkney and Shetland Act 1669 Not public and general	1669 c. 19; 1669 c. 13	17 December 1669
Act for Annexation of Orkney and Zetland to the Crown. Act for Annexation of Orkney and Shetland to the Crown.
Export of Corn Act 1669 (repealed)	1669 c. 20; 1669 c. 14	17 December 1669
Act concerning the exportation of corns. Act concerning the exportation of corn. (Repealed by Statute Law Revision (Scotland) Act 1906 (6 Edw. 7. c. 38))
Not public and general	1669 c. 21 —	17 December 1669
Act in favours of James Borthwick (Note: James Borthwick.) for a weekly mercat and tuo yeerlie fairs at the toun of Stow. Act in favour of James Borthwick, for a weekly market and two yearly fairs at the town of Stow.
Not public and general	1669 c. 22 —	17 December 1669
Act in favours of Sir Alexander Fraser of Dorris (Note: Sir Alexander Fraser of Dores.) for tuo yeirlie fairs at the kirk of Dorris. Act in favour of Sir Alexander Fraser of Dores, for two yearly fairs at the church of Dores.
Not public and general	1669 c. 23 —	17 December 1669
Act in favours of John Earle of Nithisdale (Note: John Maxwell, 3rd Earl of Nithsdale.) for a weeklie mercat and tuo yeerlie fairs at the Milntoun of Ore. Act in favour of John, Earl of Nithsdale, for a weekly market and two yearly fairs at the Milton of Urr.
Not public and general	1669 c. 24 —	17 December 1669
Act in favours of the Burgh of Perth for ane yeerlie fair. Act in favours of the Burgh of Perth, for a yearly fair.
Not public and general	1669 c. 25 —	17 December 1669
Act in favours of Charles Earle of Aboyn (Note: Charles Gordon, 1st Earl of Aboyne.) for a weekly mercat and yeerlie fair at Aboyn and a yeerlie fair at the kirk of Cabrach. Act in favour of Charles, Earl of Aboyne, for a weekly market and a yearly fair at Aboyne, and a yearly fair at the church of Cabrach.
Not public and general	1669 c. 26 —	17 December 1669
Act in favours of John Earl of Athole (Note: John Murray, 1st Marquess of Atholl.) for a yeerlie fair at Dalgarnes. Act in favour of John, Earl of Atholl, for a yearly fair at Dalgairn.
Not public and general	1669 c. 27 —	17 December 1669
Act in favours of George Earl of Panmure (Note: George Maule, 2nd Earl of Panmure.) for tuo yeerlie fairs at the Kirktoun of Monyfuith. Act in favour of George, Earl of Panmure, for two yearly fairs at the Kirkton of Monifieth.
Not public and general	1669 c. 28 —	17 December 1669
Act in favours of William Earle Marishall (Note: William Keith, 7th Earl Marischal.) for tuo yeerly fairs at Peterheid. Act in favour of William, Earl Marischal, for two yearly fairs at Peterhead.
Not public and general	1669 c. 29 —	17 December 1669
Act in favours of Adam Urquhart for a weekly mercat and tuo yeerlie fairs at Auldmeldrum. Act in favour of Adam Urquhart, for a weekly market and two yearly fairs at Old Meldrum.
Not public and general	1669 c. 30 —	17 December 1669
Act in favours of Sir George Gordoun of Haddo for fairs at Methlick and Tainglandfurd. Act in favour of Sir George Gordon of Haddo, for fairs at Methlick and Tanglandford.
Not public and general	1669 c. 31 —	17 December 1669
Act in favours of James Marques of Douglas (Note: James Douglas, 2nd Marquess of Douglas.) for two yeerlie fairs and a weeklie mercat at Lethum. Act in favour of James, Marquis of Douglas, for two yearly fairs and a weekly market at Lethem.
Not public and general	1669 c. 32 —	17 December 1669
Act in favours of the Lord Torphichen (Note: Walter Sandilands, 6th Lord Torphichen.) for fairs at Torphichen and Calder &c. Act in favour of the Lord Lorphichen, for fairs at Torphichen and Calder, etc.
Not public and general	1669 c. 33 —	17 December 1669
Act in favours of David Ross of Balnagoun for tuo yeerlie fairs at Carieblair. Act in favour of David Ross of Balnagown for two yearly fairs at Carryblair.
Not public and general	1669 c. 34 —	17 December 1669
Act in favours of David Earle of Northesk (Note: David Carnegie, 2nd Earl of Northesk.) for a yeerly fair at Errol. Act in favour of David, Earl of Northesk, for a yearly fair at Erroll.
Not public and general	1669 c. 35 —	17 December 1669
Act in favours of Gilbert Earle of Errol (Note: Gilbert Hay, 11th Earl of Erroll.) for a weekly mercat and two yeerlie fairs at the Toun of Turreff. Act in favour of Gilbert, Earl of Erroll, for a weekly market and two yearly fairs at the town of Turriff.
Ale Act 1669 (repealed)	1669 c. 36; 1669 c. 15	23 December 1669
Act for regulateing the prices of ale and drinking beer, and ratifying a former act (Note: Maltman Act 1567 (December c. 37)) declareing Maltmen to be no craft &c. Act for regulating the prices of ale and drinking beer, and ratifying a former act declaring Maltmen to be no craft, etc. (Repealed by Statute Law Revision (Scotland) Act 1906 (6 Edw. 7. c. 38))
Highways and Bridges Act 1669 (repealed)	1669 c. 37; 1669 c. 16	23 December 1669
Act for repairing High ways and Bridges. Act for repairing Highways and Bridges. (Repealed by Statute Law Revision (Scotland) Act 1964 (c. 80))
March Dykes Act 1669 still in force	1669 c. 38; 1669 c. 17	23 December 1669
Act anent incloseing of Ground. Act regarding enclosing of Ground.
Adjudications Act 1669 (repealed)	1669 c. 39; 1669 c. 18	23 December 1669
Act anent Adjudications. Act regarding Adjudications. (Repealed by Statute Law Revision (Scotland) Act 1964 (c. 80))
Confirmation and Quots Act 1669 (repealed)	1669 c. 40; 1669 c. 19	23 December 1669
Act concerning the Confirmation and Quots of Testaments. Act concerning the Confirmation and Quots of Testaments. (Repealed by Statute Law Revision (Scotland) Act 1906 (6 Edw. 7. c. 38))
Supply Act 1669 (repealed)	1669 c. 41; 1669 c. 20	23 December 1669
Act for inbringing of Publict dues from the Northern Shyres. Act for collection of Public dues from the Northern Shires. (Repealed by Statute Law Revision (Scotland) Act 1906 (6 Edw. 7. c. 38))
Moratorium Act 1669 (repealed)	1669 c. 42 —	23 December 1669
Act suspending payment of publict debts till the next session of Parliament. Act suspending the payment of public debts until the next session of Parliament. (Repealed by Statute Law Revision (Scotland) Act 1906 (6 Edw. 7. c. 38))
Not public and general	1669 c. 43 —	23 December 1669
Protection to William Dick grandchild and appearand air to Sir William Dick. Protection to William Dick, grandchild and apparent heir to Sir William Dick.
Not public and general	1669 c. 44 —	23 December 1669
Ratification in favours of Anna Dutches of Hammiltoun (Note: Anne Hamilton, 3rd Duchess of Hamilton.) of the Dukedome Lordship and Regality of Hamiltoun. Ratification in favour of Anne, Duchess of Hamilton, of the Dukedom, Lordship and Regality of Hamilton.
Not public and general	1669 c. 45 —	23 December 1669
Ratification in favours of Archibald Earle of Argyll (Note: Archibald Campbell, 9th Earl of Argyll.) of the Lands and Earledome of Argyll &c. Ratification in favour of Archibald, Earl of Argyll, of the Lands and Earldom of Argyll, etc.
Not public and general	1669 c. 46 —	23 December 1669
Ratification of the Rehabilitation in favours of Archibald Earle of Argyle &c. Ratification of the rehabilitation in favour of Archibald, Earl of Argyll, etc.
Not public and general	1669 c. 47 —	23 December 1669
Ratification in favours of Sir John Baird of Newbyth of his infeftment of the barony of Gilmertoun. Ratification in favour of Sir John Baird of Newbyth, of his infeftment of the barony of Gilmerton.
Not public and general	1669 c. 48 —	23 December 1669
Ratification in favours of Sir James Dalrymple of Stair of the lands of Stair &c. Ratification in favour of Sir James Dalrymple of Stair, of the lands of Stair, etc.
Not public and general	1669 c. 49 —	23 December 1669
Ratification in favours of M^{r} Andrew Oswald of Dalders and his spous and David Oswald his sonne of the lands of Dalders. Ratification in favour of Mr Andrew Oswald of Dalderse, and his spouse, and David Oswald, his son, of the lands of Dalderse.
Not public and general	1669 c. 50 —	23 December 1669
Ratification in favours of Mr John Young of Leny of the Lands of Over and Nether Lenies. Ratification in favour of Master John Young of Leny, of the Lands of Over and Nether Leny.
Not public and general	1669 c. 51 —	23 December 1669
Ratification in favours of Thomas Moncreiff of the lands and barrony of Moncreiff. Ratification in favour of Thomas Moncrieff, of the lands and barony of Moncrieff.
Not public and general	1669 c. 52 —	23 December 1669
Ratification in favours of Mungo Grahame of Gorthie of parts of the lands and barony of Gorthie. Ratification in favour of Mungo Graham of Gorthie, of parts of the lands and barony of Gorthie.
Not public and general	1669 c. 53 —	23 December 1669
Ratification in favours of James Archbishop of St Andrews (Note: James Sharp, Archbishop of St Andrews.) and his sone of the lands of Fothers &c. Ratification in favour of James, Archbishop of St Andrews, and his son, of the lands of Fothars, etc.
Not public and general	1669 c. 54 —	23 December 1669
Ratification in favours of William Murray fiar of Ochtertyre and Patrick Murray his sone of their infeftment of the barony of Foulls &c. Ratification in favour of William Murray fiar of Ochtertyre, and Patrick Murray, his son, of their infeftment of the barony of Foulis, etc.
Not public and general	1669 c. 55 —	23 December 1669
Ratification in favours of Sir Robert Cuninghame Knight of the lands of Auchinharvie &c. Ratification in favour of Sir Robert Cunningham, Knight, of the lands of Auchenharvie, etc.
Not public and general	1669 c. 56 —	23 December 1669
Act in favours of Sir James Drummond of Machany of the Lands and Barony of Uchtermachany. Ratification in favour of Sir James Drummond of Machany, of the Lands and Barony of Auchtermachany.
Not public and general	1669 c. 57 —	23 December 1669
Ratification in favours of Sir Alexander Fraser his Majesties Phisician, of the Lands and Barony of Durris. Ratification in favour of Sir Alexander Fraser, his Majesty's Physician, of the Lands and Barony of Dores.
Not public and general	1669 c. 58 —	23 December 1669
Ratification in favours of Sir John Forbes of Watertoun of the Lands of Ardgrein &c.
Not public and general	1669 c. 59 —	23 December 1669
Ratification in favours of John Earle of Tueddale of the lands and barony of Auldhamstocks.
Not public and general	1669 c. 60 —	23 December 1669
Ratification in favours of David Fothringhame of Powrie and his sone of the lands and baronie of Powrie Fothringhame. Ratification in favour of David Fotheringham of Powrie and his son, of the lands and barony of Powrie Fotheringham.
Not public and general	1669 c. 61 —	23 December 1669
Ratification in favours of Sir John Keith of Keithhall, of the lands and barony of Caskieben.
Not public and general	1669 c. 62 —	23 December 1669
Ratification in favours of Sir James Lockhart of Lee, of the lands and barrony of Symontoun.
Not public and general	1669 c. 63 —	23 December 1669
Ratification in favours of Johne Forbes of Culloden of the lands and barony of Culloden and Kinkell Fraser.
Not public and general	1669 c. 64 —	23 December 1669
Ratification in favours of David Blair of Adamtoun of the Barony of Adamtoun.
Not public and general	1669 c. 65 —	23 December 1669
Ratification in favours of William Master of Ross, son of George Lord Ross of Halkheid and Melvill, of the Lordship and Barony of Melvill.
Not public and general	1669 c. 66 —	23 December 1669
Ratification in favours of William Hamilton of Wishaw of Sir John Broun his right of the lands of Weddersbie.
Not public and general	1669 c. 67 —	23 December 1669
Ratification in favours of the Minister Elders and kirk Session of North Leith.
Not public and general	1669 c. 68 —	23 December 1669
Ratification in favours of the burgh of Inverbervie of their charter of erection. Ratification in favour of the burgh of Inverbervie, of their charter of erection.
Not public and general	1669 c. 69 —	23 December 1669
Ratification in favours of Hew Watt of Fulsheills and Mr Robert Watt his sone of thair infeftment of the lands of Fullsheills.
Not public and general	1669 c. 70 —	23 December 1669
Ratification in favours of Sir Adam Blair of Carberrie Knight, of the lands of Lochrig &c.
Not public and general	1669 c. 71 —	23 December 1669
Ratification in favours of George Fullarton of Dreghorne of the Lands of Dreghorne &c.
Not public and general	1669 c. 72 —	23 December 1669
Ratification in favours of Mr John Wishart Advocat of the lands and baronie of Balgavie.
Not public and general	1669 c. 73 —	23 December 1669
Ratification in favours of George Earle of Linlithgow &c. (Note: George Livingston, 3rd Earl of Linlithgow.) of the office of keeping his Majesties Palace of Linlithgow (Note: Linlithgow Palace.) and castle of Blakness. (Note: Blackness Castle.); Ratification in favour of George, Earl of Linlithgow, etc., of the office of keeping his Majesty's Palace of Linlithgow and castle of Blackness.
Not public and general	1669 c. 74 —	23 December 1669
Ratification in favours of Sir William Purves of Woodhouselie of the Lands and Barony of Thankertoun.
Not public and general	1669 c. 75 —	23 December 1669
Ratification in favours of James Stewart of Torrence of the lands of Murray and Heidhouse &c.
Not public and general	1669 c. 76 —	23 December 1669
Ratification in favours of David Viscount of Stormont of the lands and barony of Drumduff.
Not public and general	1669 c. 77 —	23 December 1669
Ratification in favours of Sir John Nisbet of Dirletoun his Majesties Advocat of the Lordship of Fentoun &c.
Not public and general	1669 c. 78 —	23 December 1669
Ratification in favours of Sir William Bruce of Balcaskie of the lands and barronie of Balcaskie.
Not public and general	1669 c. 79 —	23 December 1669
Ratification in favours of the Burgh of Forfar of their old infeftments. Ratification in favour of the Burgh of Forfar, of their old infeftments.
Not public and general	1669 c. 80 —	23 December 1669
Ratification in favours of the Girdlemakers of the burgh of Culrose. Ratification in favour of the Girdlemakers of Culross.
Not public and general	1669 c. 81 —	23 December 1669
Ratification in favours of Sir John Aytoun of Kippo of the lands and barronie of Kippo.
Not public and general	1669 c. 82 —	23 December 1669
Ratification in favours of Alexander Earle of Kellie of his gift and tack of the maills and dueties of the lands of Kings barns.
Not public and general	1669 c. 83 —	23 December 1669
Ratification in favours of Leivtennent Generall William Drummond of the Lands of Williamson &c.
Not public and general	1669 c. 84 —	23 December 1669
Ratification in favours of M^{r} Andrew Burnet writer in Edinburgh of the lands of Waristoun.
Not public and general	1669 c. 85 —	23 December 1669
Ratification in favours of Sir John Aytoun of that Ilk of an act of Exchequer anent the fewduties of the lands of Drumtennent.
Not public and general	1669 c. 86 —	23 December 1669
Ratification in favours of Sir John Nicolson of Lesswaid Knight Baronet of parts of the lands of Lesswaid.
Not public and general	1669 c. 87 —	23 December 1669
Ratification in favours of Sir Johne Nicolson of that Ilk of the lands and ba rony of Nicolson.
Not public and general	1669 c. 88 —	23 December 1669
Ratification in favours of James Earle of Perth &c. of the Barony of Dundurn.
Not public and general	1669 c. 89 —	23 December 1669
Ratification in favours of William Earle of Roxburgh of the lands and barony of Broxfield &c.
Not public and general	1669 c. 90 —	23 December 1669
Ratification in favours of the burgh Forres of their rights and infeftments.
Not public and general	1669 c. 91 —	23 December 1669
Ratification in favours of Sir Henry Bruce of Clakmanan of the lands and barony of Clakmanan &c.
Not public and general	1669 c. 92 —	23 December 1669
Ratification in favours of Sir Alexander Don of Newtoun of the Lands of Todlaw &c.
Not public and general	1669 c. 93 —	23 December 1669
Ratification in favours of Sir Patrick Home of Polwart (Note: Patrick Hume, 1st Earl of Marchmont.) of the barronie of Polwart. Ratification in favour of Sir Patrick Hume of Polwarth, of the barony of Polwarth.
Not public and general	1669 c. 94 —	23 December 1669
Ratification in favours of Sir Charles Areskine of Cambo (Note: Sir Charles Erskine, 1st Baronet of Cambo.) Lyon King at Armes &c. of the lands and barony of Cambo. Ratification in favour of Sir Charles Erskine of Cambo, Lyon King at Arms etc., of the lands and barony of Cambo.
Lyon King of Arms Act 1669 still in force	1669 c. 95 —	23 December 1669
Ratification in favours of the Lord Lyon King at armes &c. Ratification in favours of the Lord Lyon King of Arms, etc.
Not public and general	1669 c. 96 —	23 December 1669
Ratification in favours of Sir Philip Anstruther of that Ilk of the lands and barony of Anstruther. Ratification in favour of Sir Philip Anstruther of Anstruther, of the lands and barony of Anstruther.
Not public and general	1669 c. 97 —	23 December 1669
Ratification in favours of John Earle of Middletoun (Note: John Middleton, 1st Earl of Middleton.) of the Barony of Old Montrose. Ratification in favour of John, Earl of Middleton, of the Barony of Old Montrose.
Not public and general	1669 c. 98 —	23 December 1669
Ratification in favours of William Earle of Dundonald of the barony of Uchiltrie. Ratification in favour of William, Earl of Dundonald, of the barony of Ochiltree.
Not public and general	1669 c. 99 —	23 December 1669
Ratification in favours of George Dunbar elder of that Ilk of the barony of Echling. Ratification in favour of George Dundas, the elder, of Dundas, of the barony of Echline.
Not public and general	1669 c. 100 —	23 December 1669
Ratification and Dissolution of the lands of Wester Stafford and Haddenrig in favours of Sir William Ker of Hadden Director of his Majesties Chancellary. Ratification and Dissolution of the lands of Wester Stafford and Haddenrig, in favour of Sir William Kerr of Hadden, Director of His Majesty's Chancellery.
Not public and general	1669 c. 101 —	23 December 1669
Ratification in favours of Thomas Boyd of Pinkel younger of the barony of Girvane. Ratification in favour of Thomas Boyd of Penkill, the younger, of the barony of Girvan.
Not public and general	1669 c. 102 —	23 December 1669
Ratification in favours of David Philp of over Carnebie of the lands of over Carnebie &c. Ratification in favour of David Philip of Over Carnbee, of the lands of Over Carnbee, etc.
Not public and general	1669 c. 103 —	23 December 1669
Ratification in favours of M_{r} Robert Deans Advocat of the lands of Langhirdmanstoun and Currie. Ratification in favour of Mr Robert Deans, Advocate, of the lands of Longhermiston and Currie.
Not public and general	1669 c. 104 —	23 December 1669
Ratification in favours of James Earle of Annandale and Hartfell &c. of the earledome of Annandale and Hartfell, the Burgh and Barronie and Regality of Moffet &c.
Not public and general	1669 c. 105 —	23 December 1669
Ratification in favours of Sir John Dalzell of Glenae and Robert Dalzell his son of the lands and barrony of Aimsfield.
Not public and general	1669 c. 106 —	23 December 1669
Ratification in favours of Alexander Broddie elder of Letham and his sons of his Majesties acquittance of their fynes.
Not public and general	1669 c. 107 —	23 December 1669
Ratification in favours of William Lord Drumlanrig &c. of the Lands Lordship and Barrony of Sanquhar &c.
Not public and general	1669 c. 108 —	23 December 1669
Ratification in favours of the Burgh of Glasgow of their charters infeftments and priveledges &c. Ratification in favour of the Burgh of Glasgow, of their charters, infeftments, and privileges, etc.
Not public and general	1669 c. 109 —	23 December 1669
Ratification in favours of Sir Andrew Fletcher of Aberlady of the lands and barony of Aberlady. Ratification in favour of Sir Andrew Fletcher of Aberlady, of the lands and barony of Aberlady.
Not public and general	1669 c. 110 —	23 December 1669
Act & Remit in favours of Jean Viscountesse of Stormont (Note: Jean Carnegie, Viscountess of Stormont.) and David Viscount of Stormont (Note: David Murray, 5th Viscount of Stormont.) her sone for rectifieing their valuations. Remit in favour of Jean, Viscountess of Stormont, and David, Viscount of Stormont, her son, for rectifying their valuations.
Not public and general	1669 c. 111 —	23 December 1669
Act in favours of David Erskine of Dun for repairing the bridge (Note: North Water Bridge.) on the water of North Esk. Act in favour of David Erskine of Dun, for repairing the bridge on the water of North Esk.
Not public and general	1669 c. 112 —	23 December 1669
Act for changeing the way at Walter Cheislies house of Dalry. Act for changing the way at Walter Chiesley's house at Dalry.
Not public and general	1669 c. 113 —	23 December 1669
Act in favours of David Erskine of Dun for ane fair yeerlie upon the mure of Dun. Act in favour of David Erskine of Dun, for a yearly fair upon the muir of Dun.
Not public and general	1669 c. 114 —	23 December 1669
Act anent the tyme of Salmond fishing in the rivers of Dea, Don, Spey, Findhorne, Ithan, &c. Act regarding the time of Salmon fishing in the rivers of Dee, Don, Spey, Findhorn, Ythan, etc.
Printers and Stationers Act 1669 (repealed)	1669 c. 115 —	23 December 1669
Act in favours of Printers and Stationers dischargeing the custome and excise on books imported and exported. Act in favours of Printers and Stationers, discharging the custom and excise on books imported and exported. (Repealed by Statute Law Revision (Scotland) Act 1906 (6 Edw. 7. c. 38))
Not public and general	1669 c. 116 —	23 December 1669
Act in favours of William and Anna Duke and Dutches of anent the Kirks of Kinneill and Borroustounnes Hamiltoun.
Not public and general	1669 c. 117 —	23 December 1669
Act in favours of Anna Dutches of Hammiltoun for changeing a fair at Borrowstounes.
Not public and general	1669 c. 118 —	23 December 1669
Commission of Justiciary to Alexander Earle of Murray anent the fishing in the water of Findorne.
Not public and general	1669 c. 119 —	23 December 1669
Act in favours of Sir John Forbes of Monymusk for a weekly mercat at the toun of Monymusk.
Not public and general	1669 c. 120 —	23 December 1669
Act in favours of Mr George Nicolson of Cluny Advocat for a weekly mercat at the kirktoun of Cluny.
Not public and general	1669 c. 121 —	23 December 1669
Act in favours of the Burgh of Dundie for ane imposition upon the pynt of wyne.
Not public and general	1669 c. 122 —	23 December 1669
Act for a voluntar contribution to the Burgh of Dundie for reparation of their harbour.
Not public and general	1669 c. 123 —	23 December 1669
Act in favours of the Burgh of Dundie for tuo yeerlie fairs.
Not public and general	1669 c. 124 —	23 December 1669
Act in favours of the Earl of Kinghorn for a weeklie mercat and yeerlie fair at Glams.
Not public and general	1669 c. 125 —	23 December 1669
Act in favours of John Cockburn of Ormstoun for a weekly mercat and tuo fairs yeerly at Ormstoun.
Not public and general	1669 c. 126 —	23 December 1669
Act recommending the uplifting of a Contribution in favours of the Scots Incorporation at London.
Commission as to Inferior Courts Act 1669 (repealed)	1669 c. 127 —	23 December 1669
Commission anent the regulating of the Commisser Shirreff and other inferior courts of Justice. Commission regarding the regulating of the Commissary, Sheriff and other inferior courts of Justice. (Repealed by Statute Law Revision (Scotland) Act 1906 (6 Edw. 7. c. 38))
Not public and general	1669 c. 128 —	23 December 1669
Act and Remit in favours of William Lord Drumlanrig (Note: William Douglas, Lord Drumlanrig.) for rectifieing of his valuation of the barony of Hawick. Act and Remit in favour of William, Lord Drumlanrig, for rectifying of his valuation of the barony Hawick.
Not public and general	1669 c. 129 —	23 December 1669
Act in favours of William Lord Drumlanrig for tuo yeirlie fairs at the toun of Hawick. Act in favour of William, Lord Drumlanrig, for two yearly fairs at the town of Hawick.
Not public and general	1669 c. 130 —	23 December 1669
Act in favours of George Gordoun of Edinglassie for ane yeerlie fair on the hill of Invermerkie. Act in favour of George Gordon of Edinglassie, for a yearly fair on the hill of Invermarkie.
Not public and general	1669 c. 131 —	23 December 1669
Act in favours of William Buchanan of Drumakill for tuo fairs yeirlie and ane weekly mercat at the toun of Drymon. Act in favour of William Buchanan of Drumikill, for two yearly fairs and a weekly market at Drymen.
Commission for Trade Act 1669 (repealed)	1669 c. 132 —	23 December 1669
Commission for Trade. Commission for Trade. (Repealed by Statute Law Revision (Scotland) Act 1906 (6 Edw. 7. c. 38))
Not public and general	1669 c. 133 —	23 December 1669
Act in favours of Sir Patrick Home of Polwart for a yeerlie fair at the toun of Polwart. Act in favour of Sir Patrick Hume of Polwarth, for a yearly fair at the town of Polwarth.
Not public and general	1669 c. 134 —	23 December 1669
Act in favours of Alexander Earle of Murray (Note: Alexander Stuart, 5th Earl of Moray.) for changeing his fairs at Doun in Monteith. Act in favour of Alexander, Earl of Moray, for changing his fairs at Doune in Menteith.
Not public and general	1669 c. 135 —	23 December 1669
Act in favours of Sir Alexander Morison of Prestongrange for a yeerly fair and weekly mercat in the toun of Saltpans. Act for a fair and weekly market to Sir Alexander Morrison of Prestongrange, for a yearly fair and a weekly market in the town of Saltpans.
Saving the Rights Act 1669 Not public and general	1669 c. 136; 1669 c. 21	23 December 1669
Act Salvo Jure Cujuslibet. Act Salvo Jure Cujuslibet.
Adjournment Act 1669 (repealed)	1669 c. 137; 1669 c. 22	23 December 1669
Act of Adjournment. Act of Adjournment. (Repealed by Statute Law Revision (Scotland) Act 1906 (6 Edw. 7. c. 38))

=== Sources ===
- Alexander, William (1841). "Acta Parliamentorum Regis Caroli Secundi". An Abridgement of the Acts of the Parliaments of Scotland. Edinburgh: Adam and Charles Black. pp. A59 – A62 – via Google Books.
- Alexander, William (1841). "Acta Parliamentorum Regis Caroli Secundi". An Abridgement of the Acts of the Parliaments of Scotland. Edinburgh: Adam and Charles Black. pp. A59 – A62 – via Google Books.
- Chronological Table of the Statutes. London: Her Majesty's Stationery Office. 1972. pp. 1354–1355 – via Google Books.
- "Acts of the Old Scottish Parliament: 1669". legislation.gov.uk. The National Archives.
- "Index of Statutes: Index of Statutes: Charles II (1649-1685)". Records of the Parliaments of Scotland to 1707. University of St Andrews.

== See also ==
- List of legislation in the United Kingdom
- Records of the Parliaments of Scotland
