= Alexander Monteith (surgeon) =

Alexander Monteith of Auldcathie (1660–1713) was an Edinburgh surgeon, who in his three terms as deacon (president) of the Incorporation of Surgeons of Edinburgh, presided over some of the most important changes in its history. These included obtaining the rights to perform anatomical dissection on the bodies of prisoners dying in jail, the granting of a royal charter by William and Mary in 1695, and the construction of the original Surgeons' Hall, the first permanent home of the Edinburgh Surgeons.

== Surgical apprentice ==
Monteith was the son of James Monteith of Auldcathie in what is now West Lothian. He was apprenticed to William Borthwick of Pilmuir. As Borthwick had studied at two of the great European medical centres, Padua and Leyden, it was natural that he should encourage his apprentice to do the same and Monteith spent several years studying on the Continent. He was admitted as a Freeman (Fellow) of the Incorporation of Surgeons on 22 December 1691.

== Role in establishing anatomy dissection ==
On 24 October 1694 Monteith petitioned the Town Council 'for a gift' to obtain anatomical subjects for dissection. He requested 'the bodies of those who die in the Correction House [prison] and foundlings who die upon the breast...' In return he offered to treat the poor of the town 'gratis' and this was accepted by the council. He had the powerful support in this venture of Archibald Pitcairne, who had served as Professor of Physic at Leyden from 1692. Pitcairne wrote to a friend in 1694 'I doe propose, if it be granted, to make better emprovements, in anatomie than have been made at Leyden these thirttie years...' The Incorporation, concerned that Monteith might 'monopolise the whole subjects of anatomical dissection', made a similar request for bodies for dissection the following week. The Council agreed on condition that the Incorporation build an anatomy theatre for public anatomy dissections. The anatomy theatre was therefore the main reason for the building of Surgeons' Hall which opened in 1697. The first public dissection took place in 1703 when Monteith dissected the abdominal cavity on the third day of dissection.

== Deacon of the Incorporation of Surgeons ==
He was elected Deacon of the Incorporation in 1695 and again in 1699 but on the latter occasion was deposed. This was almost certainly because he was a Jacobite and the Incorporation had a strong Presbyterian tradition - all of the surgeons had signed the National Covenant in 1638. Like his friend Archibald Pitcairne, also an enthusiastic Jacobite, he seems to have had the strength of character to overcome this setback and he was again elected Deacon in 1701. Monteith rented three rooms in the basement of the new Surgeons' Hall as a 'laboratory', in which he could give instruction in chemistry to the apothecaries. His course in 'chymie' [chemistry], lasting six weeks was advertised in the Edinburgh Gazette in 1699. He seems to have used this for additional purposes because in 1700 he asked the Scottish Parliament in a petition, "That the art discovered by him to draw spirits from malt equal in goodness to true French brandy maybe declared a manufactory with the same privileges and immunities as are granted to other manufactories". This was effectively asking for a patent to distil his own brand of malt whisky.

== Charter from William and Mary ==
Monteith was therefore a Deacon at an important time in the history of the Incorporation. In 1694 the Incorporation was granted a new charter by King William and Queen Mary. This confirmed that only certified members of the Incorporation had the rights to practise surgery and pharmacy in south-east Scotland. The Charter also confirmed the responsibility of the Incorporation for the teaching of anatomy.

== Property ==
Monteith owned the estate of Todshaugh, later Foxhall, in West Lothian.

== Death ==
Gairdner gives his date of death as 23 December 1713. This date is confirmed on his grave in Greyfriars Kirkyard in central Edinburgh.
