= James Simson (surgeon) =

Surgeon (1795-1876)

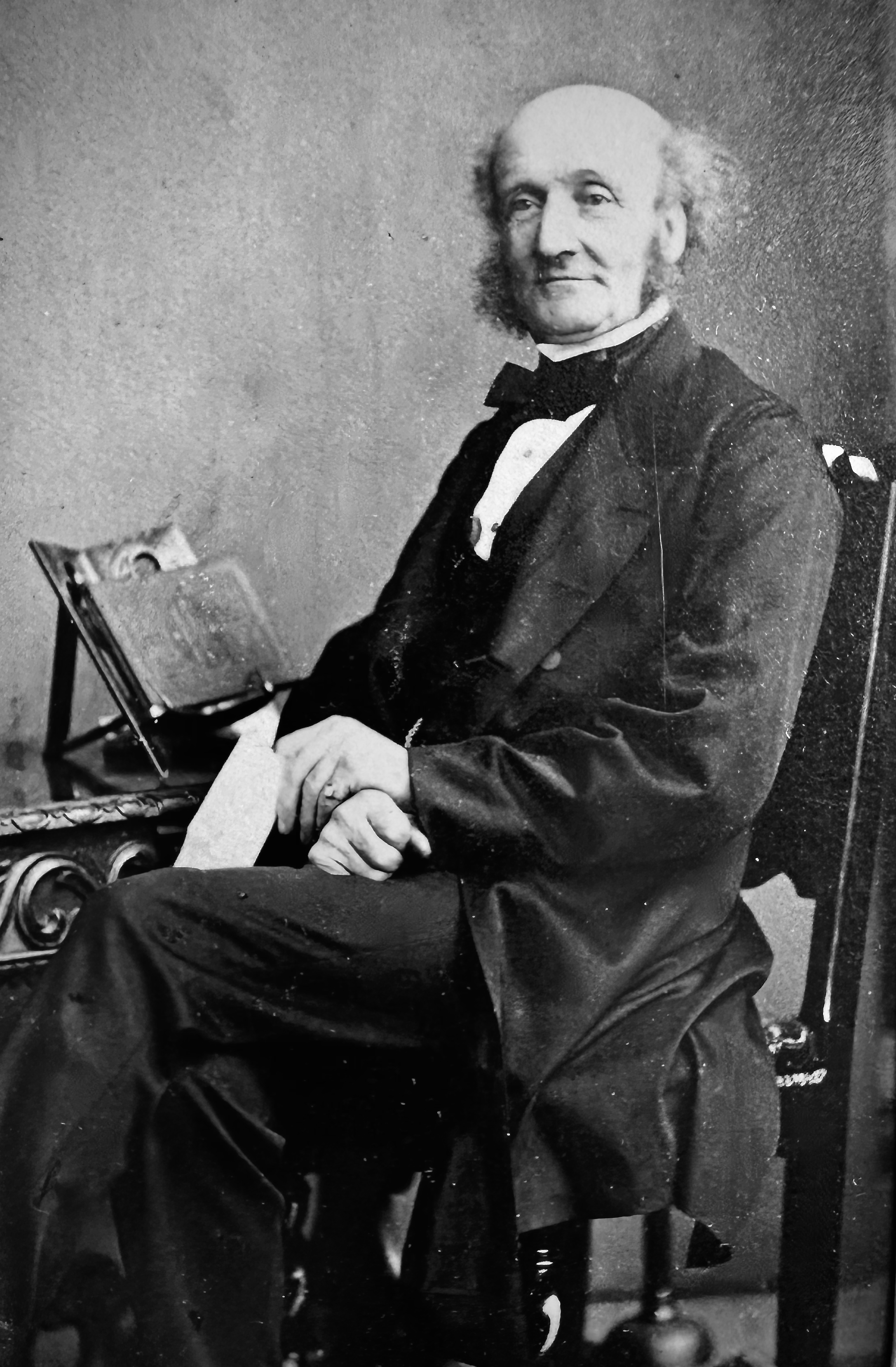
- Born: 25 August 1795; Tulliallan, Perthshire, Scotland
- Died: 8 March 1876 (aged 80); Edinburgh, Scotland
- Occupation: Surgeon
- Known for: President Royal College of Surgeons of Edinburgh on two occasions

James Simson, FRCSEd (25 August 1795 – 8 March 1876) was a Scottish surgeon, who worked for most of his career at the New Town Dispensary and was surgeon to the Edinburgh prison. He was president of the Royal College of Surgeons of Edinburgh from 1844–45 and again in 1873.

== Early life and education ==
Simson was born in Tulliallan, Perthshire, son of Rev David Simson (1740–1821), minister at Tulliallan and his wife Ann (née Patterson). Little is known of his schooling but he studied medicine at the University of Edinburgh, graduating MD in 1816 with an essay entitled Disputatio inauguralis de vitiis variis genu, quaedam pathologica complectens (An essay on various conditions of the knee including pathology). He went on to qualify as a Fellow of the Royal College of Surgeons of Edinburgh in July 1825 with a probationary essay on infanticide.

== Career ==
Simson had a large surgical practice in Edinburgh, was Medical Officer to the New Town Dispensary and also served as surgeon to the Edinburgh prison. He was active in the affairs of the Royal College of Surgeons of Edinburgh acting as an examiner and serving as honorary secretary from 1861–1873. He was elected president of the College in 1844 and again in 1873. In 1831 Simson was elected a member of the Harveian Society of Edinburgh and served as President in 1841. In 1839 he was elected a member of the Aesculapian Club.

He described a procedure for partial excision of the elbow joint for tuberculosis.

It has been suggested that James Simpson the renowned obstetrician, changed his name to James Young Simpson to avoid confusion with Simson as the two lived close to each other, Simpson in Queen Street and Simson in adjacent Frederick Street in Edinburgh's New Town.

== Family and later life ==
In 1859 he married Margaret Combe (1830–1885), daughter of James Scarth Combe, who had also served as president of the Royal College of Surgeons of Edinburgh. They had a son David James (1861–1913) and a daughter Alice (1863–1944).

Simson died at 3 Glenfinlas Street, his final Edinburgh home, on 8 March 1876.
