= James Scarth Combe =

British surgeon (1796–1883)

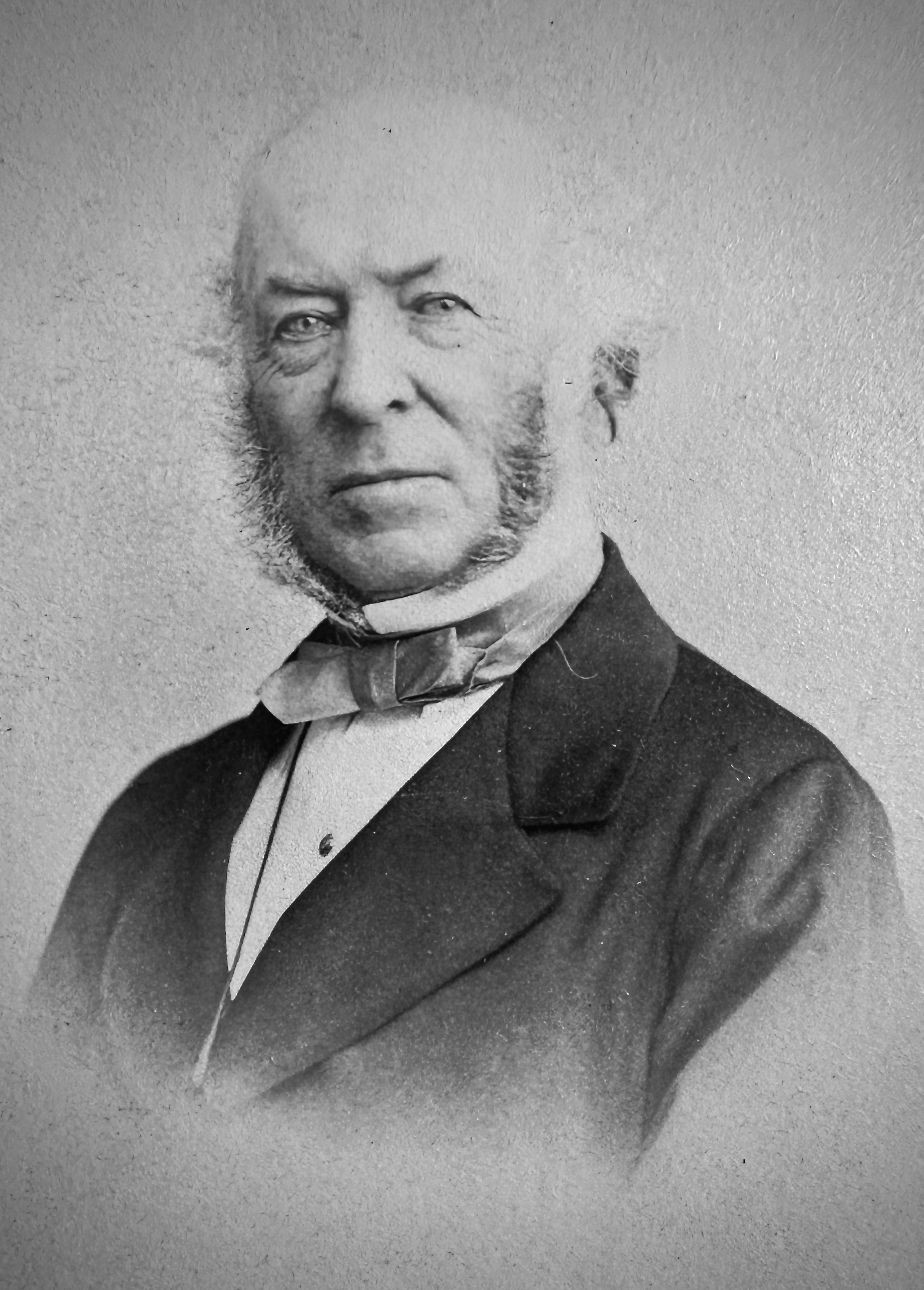

James Scarth Combe FRSE, FRCSEd (1796–1883) was a British surgeon. He was the first person to give an accurate description of pernicious anaemia and to recognise that atrophic gastritis was a feature of the condition. He was elected a Fellow of the Royal Society of Edinburgh in 1850 and served as President of the Royal College of Surgeons of Edinburgh in 1851–52.

== Early life and education ==
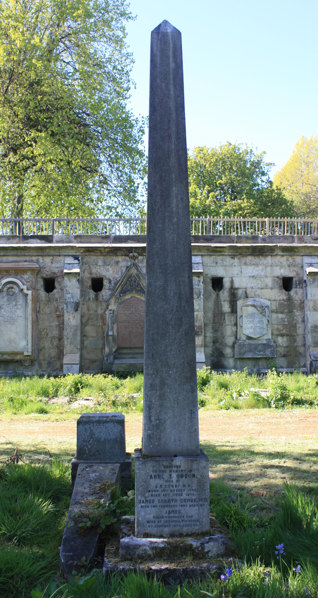
The grave of James Scarth Combe, Warriston Cemetery

Combe came from a family of brewers based in Edinburgh and appears to have been second cousin to George and Andrew Combe, who come from the same brewing family.

He was born in Leith on 5 January 1796 to Matthew Combe, a brewer at the Yardheads. After studying medicine at the University of Edinburgh, he received his doctorate (MD) in 1815 and was licensed as a surgeon (LRCSEd) in the same year. While taking the MD examination, he was being questioned by Prof Andrew Duncan when the guns of Edinburgh Castle fired to mark the victory at Waterloo and end of the Napoleonic Wars. He was elected a fellow of the Royal College of Surgeons of Edinburgh (FRCSEd) in 1823.

== Medical career ==
Combe appears to have taken an early interest in diseases of the blood, presenting a case of anaemia to the Edinburgh Medico-Chirurgical Society in 1822. In 1824 he published this in detail in a paper entitled History of a Case of Anaemia. Combe modestly starts with the statement that the case had already been presented by "my distinguished preceptor and friend Dr Kellie". He goes on to credit continental writers with earlier descriptions of the condition. Combe then describes a patient with the typical features of a severe anaemia. Despite various treatments including iron, chalybeate (iron-containing) spa water and a nourishing diet, the patient died. At the autopsy, where he was assisted by Kellie, he found the stomach was "thin, showing no vessels and transparent", a description of atrophic gastritis, which is a distinctive feature of pernicious anaemia, and preceded Dr Thomas Addison’s admittedly fuller account by 27 years. Although the condition bears Addison's name, Combe's was the first accurate description and the first to link it to atrophic gastritis.

In 1827 he was elected a member of the Harveian Society of Edinburgh.

In 1828 Combe published a paper in the Edinburgh Medical and Surgical Journal entitled "On the Poisonous effects of the Mussel, Mytius Edlulis", looking at the issue of accumulation of toxins in molluscs. At this time the mussel beds of the Firth of Forth were dangerously close to the sewage outlets of the city of Edinburgh.

Around 1829 he travelled to India to treat and study cholera in the city of Calcutta. He returned to the United Kingdom around 1832, just in time to aid in combating a wave of cholera that was sweeping across the country at that time. Back in his home town of Leith, he worked with Dr Thomas Latta on the pioneering use of intravenous infusions of saline to manage the disease. He signed Latta's death certificate when he died prematurely in 1833. In 1839 he is described as being 17 years in the practice of midwifery, delivering 100 children per year. As part of a debate on survival of premature children, he stated that there was no reason why a child of less than seven months gestation could not survive, but a child of less than five months gestation was not viable.

He moved from 27 Charlotte Street (now Queen Charlotte Street) in Leith to York Place, Edinburgh in 1847, probably at the point of becoming a manager of the Edinburgh Royal Infirmary which would have required his closer presence. Whilst now absorbed into Edinburgh, the distance between Leith and Edinburgh, though only a few miles, would have presented a significant time problem in the mid-19th century. However he remained consultant physician to Leith Hospital until his death.

In 1843 he was elected a member of the Aesculapian Club. He was elected a Fellow of the Royal Society of Edinburgh in 1850, his proposer being Robert Christison. He succeeded James Syme as President of the Royal College of Surgeons of Edinburgh in 1851 and was succeeded in 1853 by Dr Archibald Inglis.

Combe died on 14 February 1883 at his home 36 York Place, Edinburgh. He is buried with his wife in Warriston Cemetery in north Edinburgh. The grave, marked by a tall slim obelisk, lies slightly south of the central vaults.

== Family ==
In 1824 Combe married Anne Thomson (1798-1875). They had one daughter, Margaret, who married the surgeon James Simson, who, like his father-in-law, became President of the Royal College of Surgeons of Edinburgh. They had three sons Matthew, who became an army surgeon, Charles and James (1833-1877).
