= John Lauder (surgeon) =

Scottish surgeon

John Lauder (1683–1737) was a Scottish surgeon, who was Deacon (President) of the Incorporation of Surgeons of Edinburgh for four separate terms of office. His portrait (oil on canvas) c.1700 by the artist William Aikman (painter) is on display at the Royal College of Surgeons of Edinburgh.

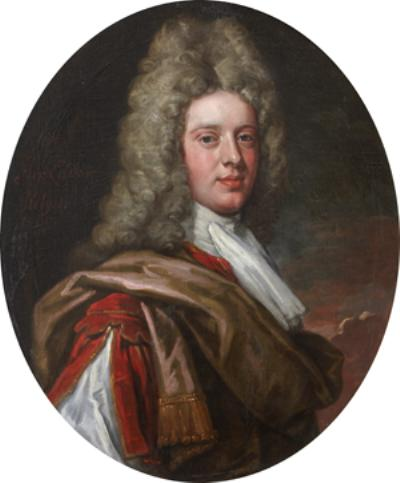
John Lauder (1683-1737) Surgeon and Deacon of the Incorporation of Surgeons of Edinburgh Edinburgh

== Surgical career ==
John Lauder was apprenticed to the surgeon Robert Campbell. In 1714 he and a fellow surgeon James Nesbit applied for the post of surgeon to George Heriot's Hospital in place of Archibald Fisher who had just died. Lauder was successful and was surgeon to the hospital from 1714 to 1737. He was elected Deacon of the Incorporation of Surgeons for the first time in 1714. In the same year he was appointed by Edinburgh Town Council to a committee to keep the peace at the time of the Jacobite rising of 1715. In the next year he was paid £346.14s Scots for 'drugs etc.' furnished by him to the Town Guard and he was one of those in attendance on Sir John Clerk, 2nd Baronet in 1718. In 1720 he was censured for his 'disgraceful behavior' for siding with the Town Council in a dispute over the election of deacons. Between 1714 and 1737 he was elected Deacon of the Incorporation of Surgeons on four occasions for a total of seven years. He died in March 1737 while in office as Deacon.

== Family ==
John Lauder was baptised on 27 July 1683 at Edinburgh, a son of Colin Lauder (1659-1690), a Burgess of Edinburgh, and Elizabeth née St.Clair, of the Herdmanston family^{[1]}. Lauder's father Colin was an Edinburgh merchant and his grandfather was Sir John Lauder, 1st Baronet, of Fountainhall. On 13 June 1691, John, William and David Lauder, children of the deceased Colin Lauder, were confirmed executors-dative to him. He married Isabella (b.1683) daughter of Edinburgh surgeon George Preston, and grand-daughter of Robert Preston who had obtained a charter of the lands of Preston, Midlothian on 20 August 1633; he was knighted, and admitted a Lord of Session on 4 March 1672, when he took the title of Lord Preston. He died in October 1674.^{[5]}

Isabella Preston and her father George were among the last descendants of the Prestons of Valleyfield & Gorton.

John Lauder's son George Lauder was also a Fellow of the Incorporation of Surgeons.^{[1]} He was thrown from his horse on 30 April 1752 and died on 8 May 1752 at Edinburgh.
