= John Campbell (Scottish surgeon) =

Scottish surgeon

John Campbell MD, FRCSEd
- Born: 17 July 1784
- Died: 9 February 1867 (aged 82); Edinburgh, Scotland
- Education: Royal High School, Edinburgh; University of Edinburgh
- Occupation: Surgeon
- Known for: Presidency of the Royal College of Surgeons of Edinburgh
- Medical career
- Institutions: Royal Infirmary of Edinburgh

John Campbell MD FRCSEd (17 July 1784 – 9 February 1867) was a Scottish surgeon. He served as president of the Royal College of Surgeons of Edinburgh from 1832 to 1834. In that capacity he was the last president of the College to sit ex officio as a member of the Edinburgh Town Council, so ending a tradition dating from 1583. During his presidency the College made the most significant change of location in its history, moving from Old Surgeons Hall in Surgeons' Square to the present Playfair building in Nicolson Street.

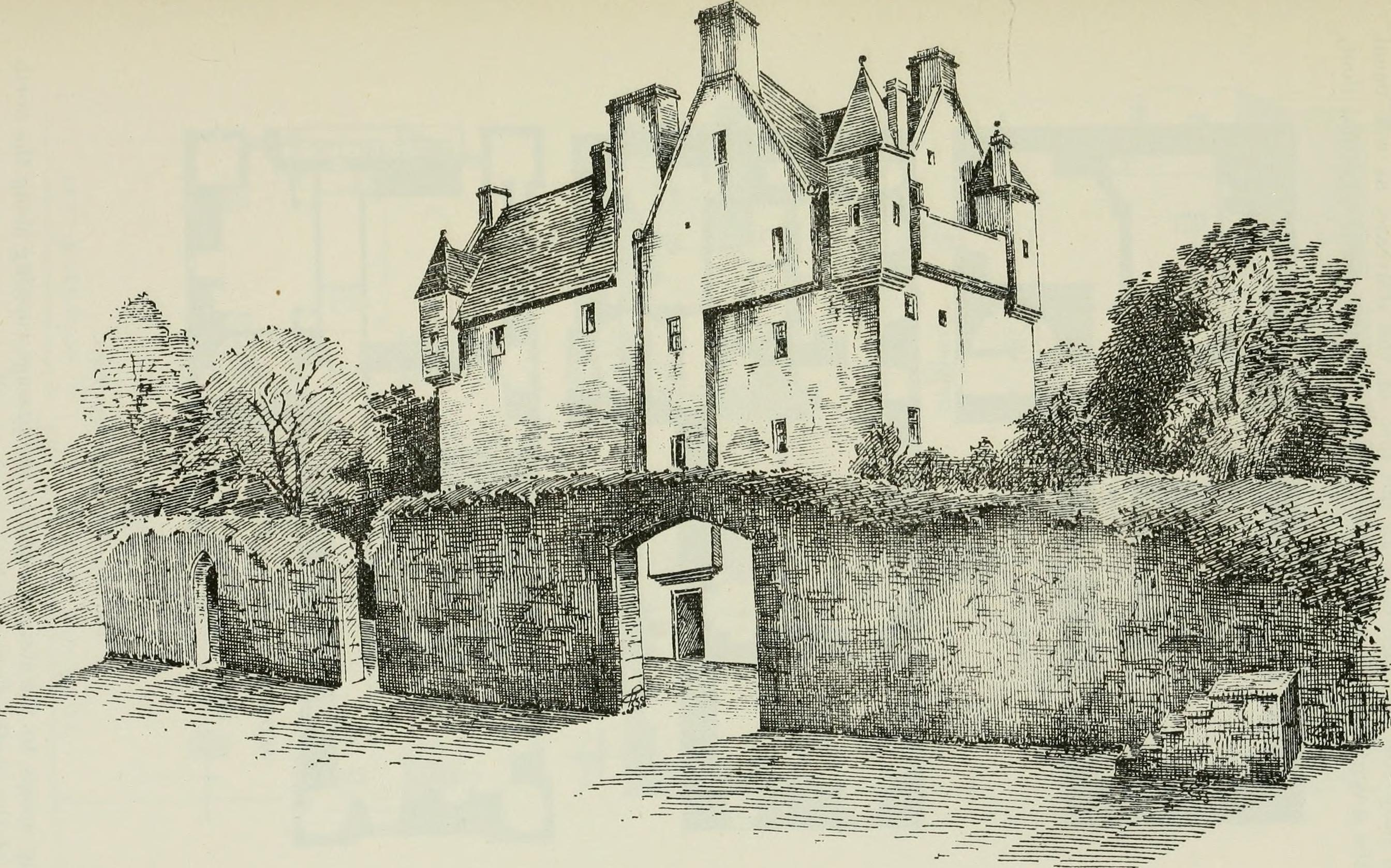
Kilbryde Castle

== Early life ==
He was born on 17 July 1784, the son of Sir James Campbell (1723–1812) 4th baronet of Aberuchil and Kilbryde and his second wife Mary Ann Campbell (née Burn). He grew up in Kilbryde Castle, near Doune, which has been home to the Campbell family since 1589 and is owned by them into the 21st century. His elder half brother Alexander Campbell (1757–1824) inherited the baronetcy becoming the 5th Baronet. John Campbell went to school at the Royal High School in Edinburgh, at that time in High School Yards, and was dux of the school. He returned to the Kilbryde estate before joining the army.

== Medical career ==
In 1815 at the age of 31, he graduated MD from the University of Edinburgh with a thesis entitled De angina pectoris. He passed the examinations to become a Fellow of the Royal College of Surgeons of Edinburgh (RCSEd) in 1823 and was appointed assistant surgeon to the Royal Infirmary of Edinburgh (RIE) in 1825.

In 1827 Campbell was elected a member of the Harveian Society of Edinburgh and served as President in 1831. In 1828 he was elected a member of the Aesculapian Club. He was elected president of the Royal College of Surgeons of Edinburgh in 1832 and during his term of office presided over the most significant change of location in the college's history, the move from Old Surgeons Hall in Surgeons' Square to the present Playfair building in Nicolson Street. He was the last president of the RCSEd to sit as an unelected member of the Edinburgh Town Council, so ending a tradition dating from 1583.

He became consulting surgeon to the RIE in 1832 alongside Sir George Ballingall, who held the chair of Military Surgery in the University, the first of its kind in the British Isles. The junior surgeons in the RIE at that time were a gifted group of young men, who would become famous in their own right. These included James Syme, Robert Liston, John Lizars, William Fergusson and John William Turner. In 1838 Campbell retired and joined the hospital board of management.

== Family ==
In 1811 his sister Eleanora married John Barclay, the Edinburgh anatomy teacher who had been employed as tutor to the Campbell household for three years from 1789.

In 1807 Campbell married Catherine Logan (1788–1865) from Ayrshire. Their youngest son John Logan Campbell, graduated in medicine from the University of Edinburgh. He emigrated to New Zealand, becoming a successful businessman and politician. He was known as "The father of Auckland" and was knighted in 1902.

== Later years and death ==
Campbell died at 3 Rutland Street, Edinburgh on 9 February 1867.
