= George Lauder (surgeon) =

Scottish surgeon (1712–1762)

- Born: c. 1712; Scotland
- Died: 8 May 1752 (aged 39–40); Midlothian, Scotland
- Occupation: Surgeon
- Known for: President Royal College of Surgeons of Edinburgh

George Lauder, FRCSEd (c. 1712 – 8 May 1752) was an Edinburgh surgeon who was deacon (president) of the Incorporation (later Royal College) of Surgeons of Edinburgh in 1744. During the Jacobite rising of 1745-46 he cared for the wounded after the Battle of Prestonpans, acted as surgeon with the Jacobite army on its march into England and retreat to Scotland, where he cared for wounded after the Battle of Falkirk.

== Early life and education ==
Lauder was born around 1712, the son of John Lauder, an Edinburgh surgeon-apothecary, who had been deacon of the Incorporation of Surgeons of Edinburgh, and his wife Isabella (née Preston). He was made an Edinburgh burgess on 6 April 1725 as his father, also a burgess, was able to pass that right to his sons. Lauder served a surgical apprenticeship and was elected a Freeman (Fellow) of the Incorporation on 20 April 1737.

== Career ==
Lauder became a surgeon-apothecary in Edinburgh, training a number of surgical apprentices: William Jarvis (1741); John Gordon (1742) and John Lumsden (1744). In 1744 he was elected Deacon of the Incorporation of Surgeons. After the Battle of Prestonpans in September 1745, he attended the wounded with his friend and fellow surgeon John Rattray. Other local surgeons who also attended included Alexander Monro (primus), and Alexander ('Lang Sandy') Wood. Lauder and Rattray remained as surgeons with the Jacobite army as Prince Charles Edward Stuart led it to Derby and then back to Scotland. They were captured after the Battle of Culloden and held prisoner, initially in a church in Inverness with other prisoners some of whom were wounded. According to the account of Robert Forbes their surgical instruments were taken from them to prevent them treating the wounded. They were moved to Inverness gaol, from where Lauder and Rattray were released as a result of a plea by Rattray's golfing companion Duncan Forbes, Lord Culloden. They arrived back in Edinburgh in May 1746 but were re-arrested on the orders of the Duke of Cumberland and held prisoner in London for seven months. Lauder and Rattray were finally released in January 1747.

As part of his plea for freedom Lauder made a lengthy representation detailing the care that he and Rattrray had provided for the wounded government troops after the battles of Prestonpans and Falkirk. After Prestonpans he detailed his treatment of eight named officers and went on:

"Mr Rattray and I, that day likewise operated upon and dressed almost three hundred private Men, two hundred and eighty of which were taken into the Charity Work-house, where they were taken care of by Mr [Alexander] Wood and I, who are the Surgeons belonging to that House, but my charge of them was greatest as I performed the whole operations and furnished the Medecines but of my own shop gratis. Besides taking care of the wounded I likewise at my own expense, carryed out to the Prisoners at Colonel Gardiner's House, two Dozen of Wine, eight large loaves of bread, and a good quantity of cheese."

Lauder returned to surgical practice in Edinburgh, training five more apprentices between 1751 and 1757. At the trial of Provost Archibald Stewart for high treason before the Justiciary Court in 1747, Lauder was one of the witnesses for the defence. As deacon he was an ex officio member of the Edinburgh Town Council and spoke in defence of Stewart's efforts to raise militia to protect the city again the advancing Jacobite army in 1745.

== Family and later life ==
His father John Lauder (1683–1738) was an Edinburgh surgeon, his paternal grandfather Colin Lauder (1659–1690) was an Edinburgh merchant and his great-grandfather was Sir John Lauder, 1st Baronet. George Lauder married Rosina Preston (c1690 -1786) around 1739, presumably a relation of his mother's. They had one daughter Mary (b 14 October 1742) and four sons, William (b 1743) who was served heir to his father on 16 March 1753. , John (b 8 March 1748), George (b1749) and Colin (b 1750). Their son Colin Lauder (b. 1750) became a surgeon in Edinburgh.

George Lauder sustained a head injury when he fell from his horse at Lugton, Midlothian, which resulted in his death in 1752.
