= Rowan Parks =

Professor of Surgical Sciences at the University of Edinburgh

Rowan Parks MBBCh, MD, FRCSEd, FRCSI
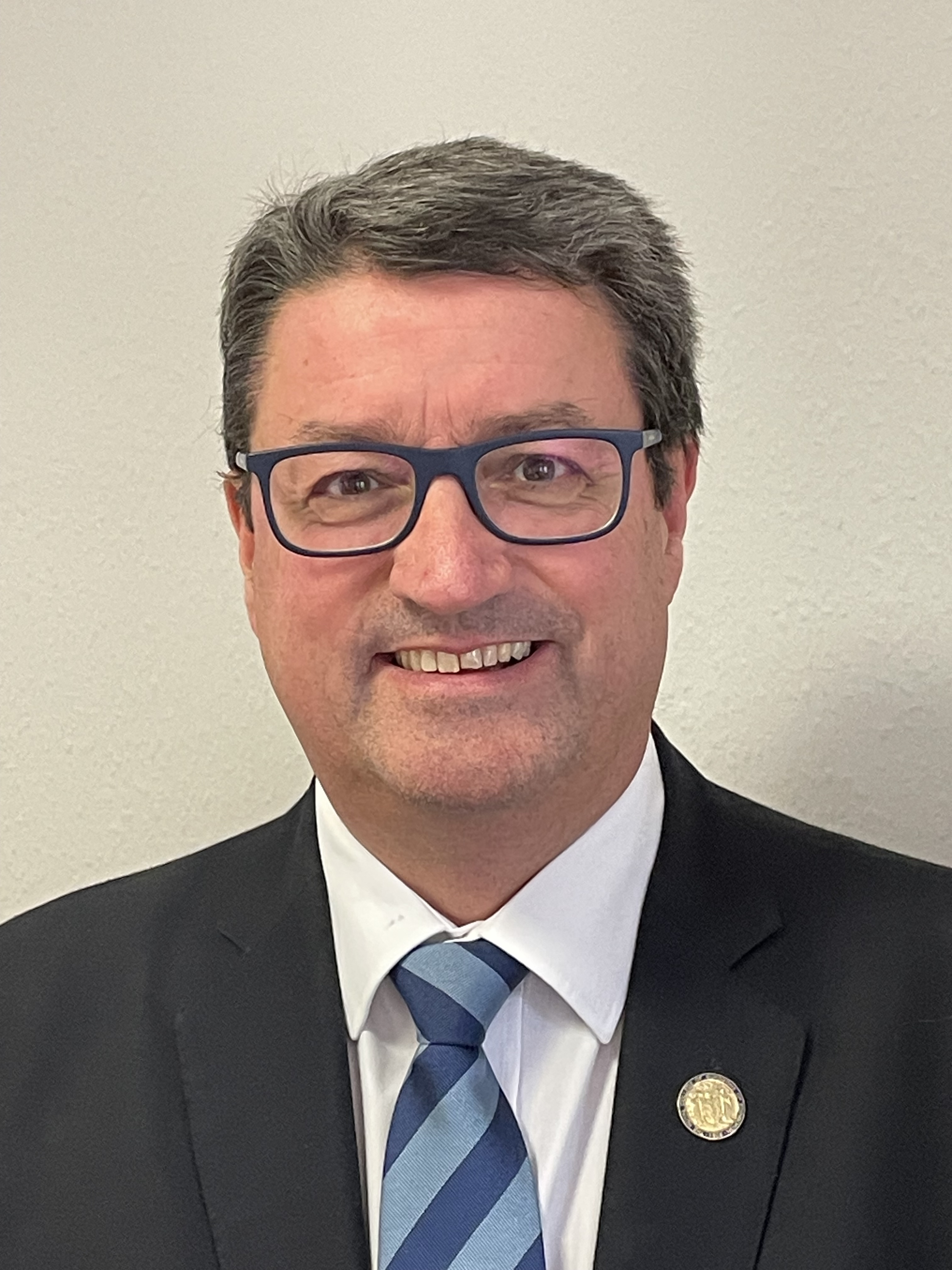
- Rowan Parks in 2024
- Born: Rowan Wesley Parks; 5 March 1966 (age 60); Belfast, Northern Ireland
- Education: Royal Belfast Academical Institution; University of Belfast
- Occupation: Professor of surgery
- Known for: Hepato-biliary surgery; Surgical education and training; Presidency Royal College of Surgeons of Edinburgh
- Medical career
- Profession: Hepato-pancreato-biliary surgery
- Institutions: University of Edinburgh
- Research: HPB malignancy; Biliary injury; Pancreatitis
- Awards: Millin medal; Moynihan medal

Rowan Wesley Parks FRCSEd, FRCSI (RCSI) (born 5 March 1966) is a British doctor and academic who is professor of surgical sciences at the University of Edinburgh and past president of the Royal College of Surgeons of Edinburgh (RCSEd). He is a hepato-biliary surgeon who trained in Belfast and Edinburgh and is general secretary of the International Hepato-Pancreato-Biliary Association (IHPBA) and a past president of the Association of Surgeons of Great Britain and Ireland (ASGBI). His interests include postgraduate medical education and training and he has held senior positions within NHS Education for Scotland (NES). His research interests in hepato-biliary research has resulted in numerous peer reviewed papers and other publications.

== Early life and education ==
Rowan Parks was born in Belfast, to George Parks, a professor of surgery, and his wife Elisabeth (nee Mahood). His school education was at Inchmarlo preparatory school and then Royal Belfast Academical Institution. He received his medical qualification from Queens University Belfast in 1989 and completed surgical training in Northern Ireland.

== Career ==
After being awarded the Fellowship of the Royal College of Surgeons in Ireland (RCSI) in 1993, Parks carried out a research project in Belfast at the Department of Surgery in Queens University. He investigated the mechanisms by which obstructive jaundice influenced gut barrier function. This work formed the basis of a thesis for which he received an MD degree in 1997. This led on to a clinical fellowship in hepato-biliary (HPB) surgery at the Royal Infirmary of Edinburgh. He became a senior lecturer in surgery at the University of Edinburgh and was made honorary consultant surgeon in the Royal Infirmary of Edinburgh in 1999. He became reader in 2006 and four years later the university created a personal chair for him as professor of surgical sciences.

During this time he developed an interest in surgical education and training, working with NHS Education for Scotland (NES), where he chaired NES surgical training committees and served as Associate Postgraduate Dean for South-East Scotland. From 2012 to 2022 he was Deputy Medical Director of NES.

Parks is a past president of the Royal College of Surgeons of Edinburgh and is also general secretary of the International Hepato-Pancreato-Biliary Association (IHPBA). He is an honorary patron of the Scottish Cancer Foundation, a charity which financially supports cancer research and promotes cancer awareness.

== Personal life ==
Parks is the son of Professor George Parks, who was president of the Royal College of Surgeons in Ireland.

== Awards and recognitions ==
As a member of the Association of Surgeons of Great Britain and Ireland (ASGBI) he was awarded Moynihan Medal for best original research in 1996 and the Moynihan travelling fellowship in 2001. He served as president of ASGBI between 2017 and 2018.

In 2000 Parks gave the Millin Lecture and received the Millin medal at the RCSI. He was awarded a Travelling Fellowship from the James IV Association of Surgeons in March 2004, enabling him to visit surgical centres around the world to study techniques in HPB surgery. The James IV Association is an international organisation which exists to promote the exchange of surgical knowledge and promote the highest standards of surgical care. and he became a member of the Association in 2008. He is also a past-president of the Great Britain & Ireland Hepato-Pancreato-Biliary Association (GBIHPBA), an organisation which promotes improving healthcare in HPB disease and supports research, training and public awareness in the speciality. He received the President's Medal from the Royal Australasian College of Surgeons.

He has received honorary fellowships from:

- The Royal College of Physicians and Surgeons of Glasgow
- The College of Surgeons of Sri Lanka
- The College of Physicians and Surgeons of Pakistan
- The Association of Surgeons in India
- The Royal College of Surgeons in Ireland
- The American College of Surgeons

== Selected publications and research ==
Parks' bibliography includes more than 180 papers and 48 book chapters, and he has edited 11 surgical textbooks. Parks' primary clinical and research interests lie in various aspects of HPB Surgery.

=== Papers ===
- K Soreide, AJ Healey, DJ Mole, RW Parks Pre-, Peri- and Post-operative Factors for the Development of Pancreatic Fistula After Pancreatic Surgery. HPB 2019; 21: 1621-1631 doi: 10.1016/j.hpb.2019.06.004. Epub 2019 Jul 27. PMID 31362857.
- LM Brunt, DJ Deziel, DA Telem, SM Strasberg, R Aggarwal, H Asbun, J Bonjer, M McDonald, A Alseidi, M Ujiki, TS Riall, C Hammill, CA Moulton, PH Pucher, RW Parks, MT Ansari, S Connor, RC Dirks, B Anderson, MS Altieri, L Tsamalaidze, D Stefanidis. Safe Cholecystectomy Multi-Society Practice Guideline and State of the Art Consensus Conference on Prevention of Bile Duct Injury During Cholecystectomy.. Annals of Surgery 2020; 272: 3-23. doi: 10.1097/SLA.0000000000003791. PMID 32404658.
- B Nordlinger, H Sorbye, B Glimelius, GJ Poston, PM Schlag, P Rougier, WO Bechstein, JN Primrose, ET Walpole, M Finch-Jones, D Jaeck, D Mirza, RW Parks, M Mauer, E Tanis, E Van Cutsem, W Scheithauer, T Gruenberger. Peri-operative FOLFOX4 Chemotherapy and Surgery Versus Surgery Alone for Resectable Liver Metastases from Colorectal Cancer (EORTC 40983): Long-term Results of a Randomised, Controlled, Phase 3 Trial. Lancet Oncology 2013; 14: 1208-1215. doi.org/10.1016/S1470-2045(13)70447-9.Epub 2013 Oct 11.
- DI Tsilimigras, P Brodt, PA Clavien, RJ Muschel, MI D'Angelica, I Endo, RW Parks, M Doyle, E de Santibanes, TM Pawlik. Liver Metastases. Nature Reviews Disease Primers 2021;7(1):27. doi: 10.1038/s41572-021-00261-6. PMID 33859205.

=== Books ===
- Parks, Rowan W. (2005). Surgery in Focus. Churchill Livingstone. ISBN 0-443-07377-5.
- Garden, O. James; Parks, Rowan W.; Wigmore, Stephen J. (2022). Principles and Practice of Surgery. Elsevier. ISBN 978-0-7020-8251-1.
- Parks, Rowan W.; Wigmore, Stephen J.; Paterson-Brown, Simon; Garden, O. James (2023). Hepatobiliary and Pancreatic Surgery. Companion to Specialist Surgic. ISBN 978-0-7020-8457-7.
