= Alexander Gillespie =

Scottish surgeon (1776-1859)

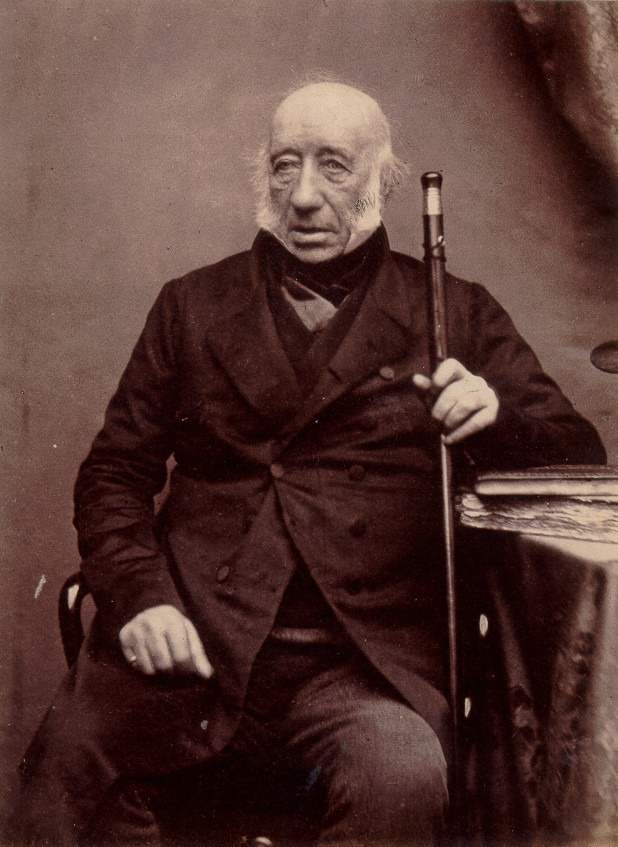

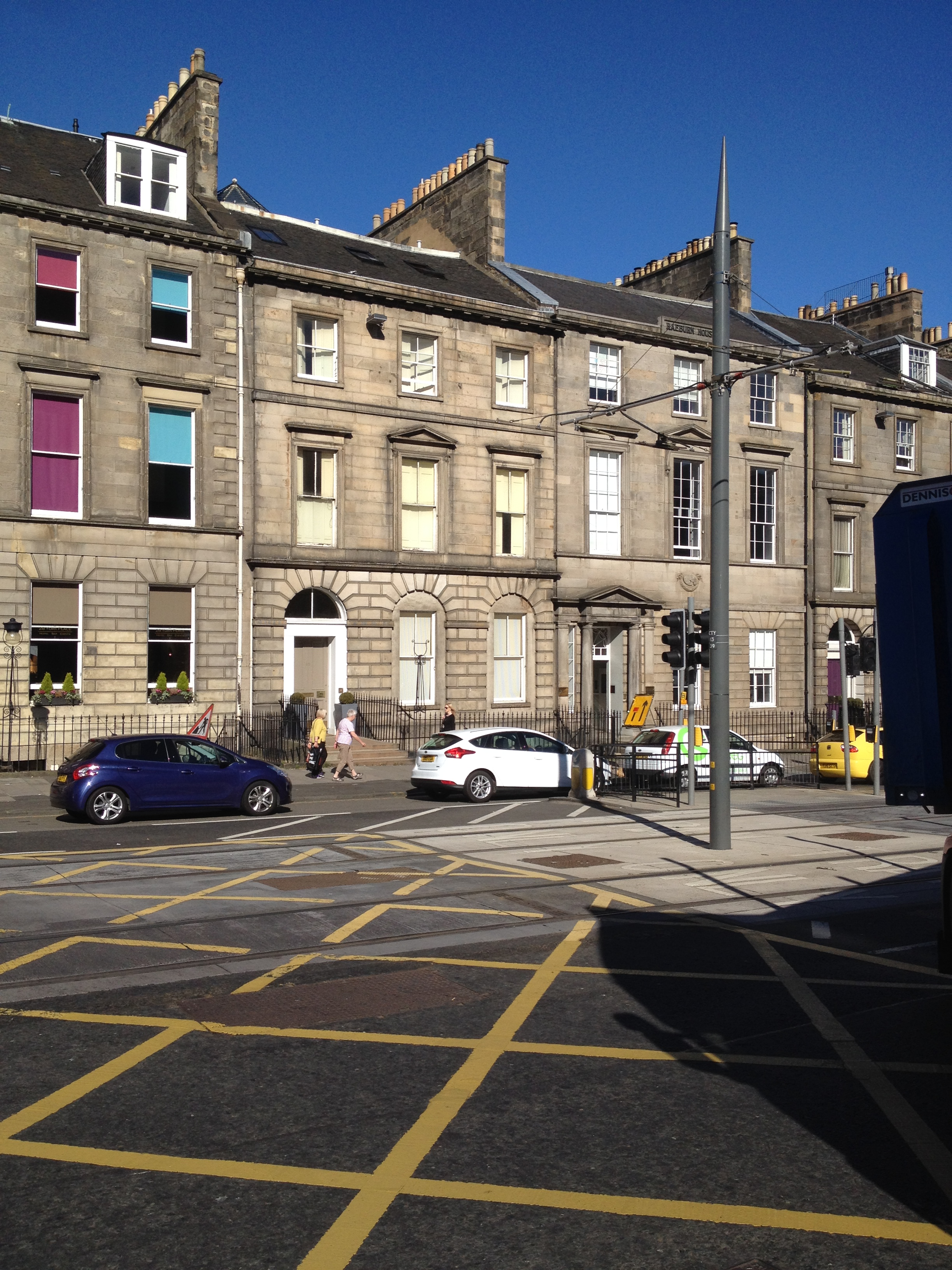
30 York Place, Edinburgh

Alexander Gillespie FRSE, FRCSEd (21 March 1776 – 2 September 1859) was a Scottish surgeon. He is one of the few persons to have served two non-consecutive periods as President of the Royal College of Surgeons of Edinburgh. He was President from 1810 to 1812 and again from 1818 to 1820.

== Early life and education ==
Alexander Gillespie was born in Ayr, the son of Dr. Thomas Gillespie, an Ayrshire physician, and his wife Jean Gillespie (née Thomson). He became a Licentiate of the Royal College of Surgeons of Edinburgh in 1794 and a Fellow in 1803.

He obtained the degree of MD from the University of St Andrews Medical School in 1822, some 28 years after he began to practice medicine. This was common practice at this time with the St Andrews degrees being conferred based on a written testimonial and payment of a fee, without the need for the candidate visiting St Andrews Like many practitioners of his day, he combined surgery with general practice. He had appointments as a surgeon at several institutions including the Lock Hospital in Surgeons' Square, the Edinburgh Lunatic Asylum, and Gillespie's Hospital for the Elderly. He was a surgeon at Donaldson's Hospital, a school that had family connections. His sister Jane Gillespie (1770–1828) married James Donaldson (1751–1830), who bequeathed a large part of his estate to establish Donaldson's Hospital, founded to maintain and educate poor children. There is an insight into Alexander Gillespie's practice in his son's obituary which observes that Alexander Gillespie 'worked his easy largely aristocratic practice with a light hand...'

== Membership of societies ==
In 1802 Gillespie was elected a member of the Harveian Society of Edinburgh and served as President in 1820. In 1803 he was elected a member of the Aesculapian Club. In 1806 he is listed as a member of the Royal Highland Agricultural Society. In 1812 he was elected a Fellow of the Royal Society of Edinburgh. His proposers were Thomas Allan, James Russell and Ninian Imrie.

== Later life and family ==
In 1818 he was living at 30 York Place in Edinburgh's New Town, a handsome Georgian terraced townhouse. Post Office Directories continue to show him here for many years but his given occupation changed from surgeon to doctor in 1834, suggesting that he had given up surgery in favor of general practice.

He died in Edinburgh on 2 September 1859 at 45 Castle Street and is buried in Dalry Cemetery.

On 1 June 1812, he married Eliza Mary Shirriff. Their son, James Donaldson Gillespie (1824-1891) graduated MD from the University of Edinburgh, gained the FRCSEd diploma, became a surgeon in the Royal Infirmary of Edinburgh, and was President of the Royal College of Surgeons of Edinburgh between 1869 and 1871.
