= James Borthwick =

Scottish surgeon

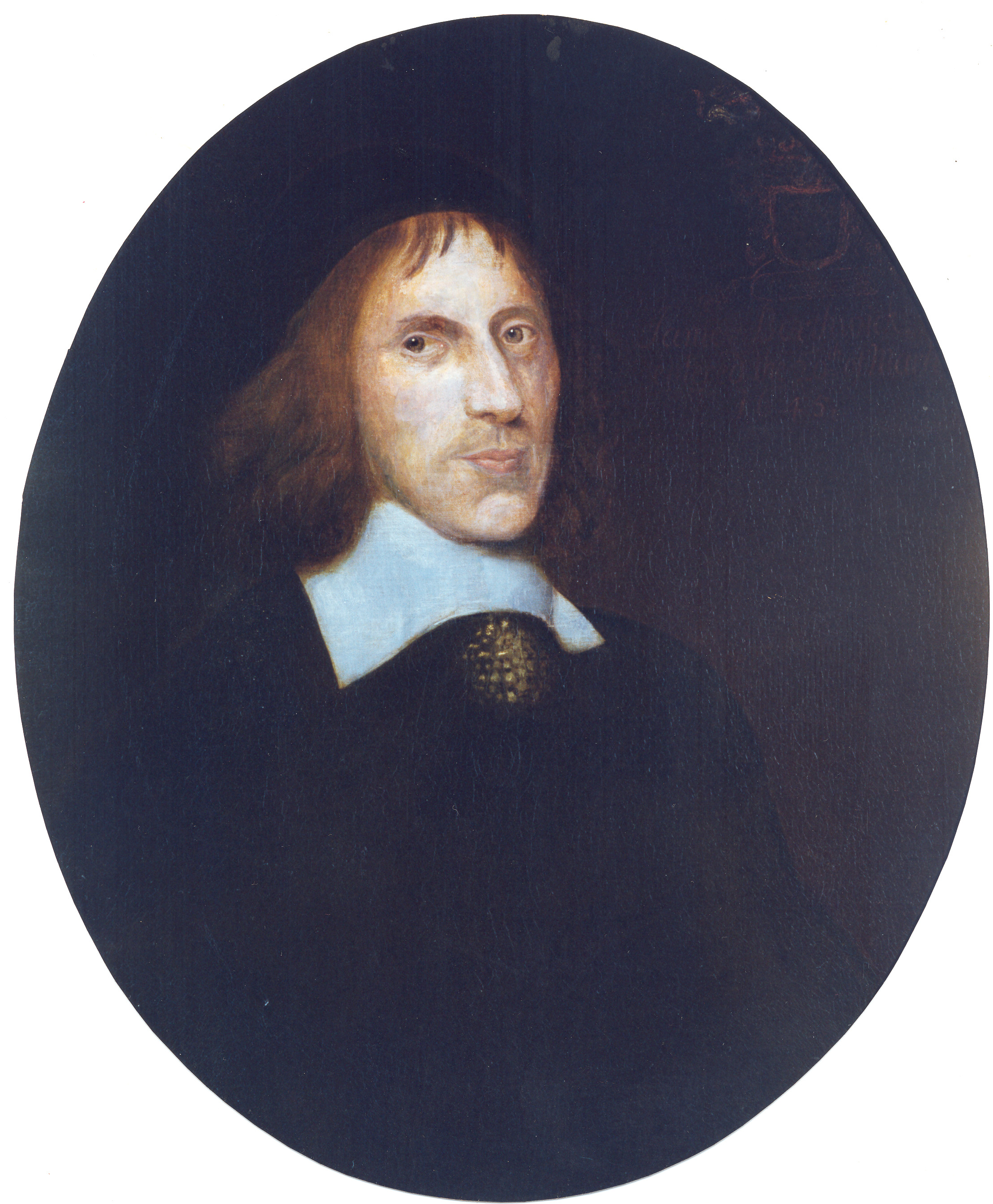
- Portrait of James Borthwick in c. 1660
- Born: 1615
- Died: 1675 (aged 59–60); Edinburgh
- Occupation: Surgeon
- Known for: Formalising the status of surgeon-apothecaries in Edinburgh

James Borthwick of Stow (1615 – 1675) was a Scottish surgeon who was the first teacher of anatomy in the Incorporation of Surgeons and Barbers of Edinburgh. He was Deacon (President) of the Incorporation on two occasions and a member of the Scottish Parliament. Borthwick was largely responsible for the formal creation of the surgeon-apothecary in Edinburgh.

== Early life and admission to the Incorporation of Surgeons ==
James Borthwick inherited the estate of Stow south of Edinburgh. He served his apprenticeship as an apothecary and was admitted to the Incorporation of Surgeons in 1645 without first having served a surgical apprenticeship, an unusual event at that time. It is likely this exception was granted because the membership of the Incorporation had been reduced by plague. The College minutes of 7 December 1646 record that he was admitted 'through ye decrease of certain masters in ye common visitation.' It seems likely that his admission was arranged specifically so that he could teach anatomy to the surgical apprentices, the first member to have this responsibility.

== Surgical career ==
Borthwick's duties included performing anatomical dissections for the instruction of apprentices. His admission and appointment as anatomy teacher appear to have been facilitated by Alexander Pennycuik with whom he had served as a surgeon with the army overseas and who was Deacon of the Incorporation at the time of Borthwick’s appointment.

This was the first time that the Incorporation had designated a specific teacher of anatomy and his appointment may be regarded as the first appointment in the Edinburgh extramural school of medicine..

Borthwick, having served time as an apothecary, introduced the teaching of pharmacy into the Incorporation, an addition to the surgeons repertoire which reduced the decline in the fortunes of the Incorporation by making a surgical career more attractive.

He was responsible, jointly, with Thomas Kincaid for the act of the Town Council which, in 1657, brought the Surgeon- Apothecary into being in Edinburgh. Up until then the surgeons and apothecaries had different areas of practice, the surgeons being responsible for treating tumours, wounds, ulcers and fractures while the apothecaries were involved in dispensing medicines. After the 1657 Act it became possible to combine these skills as a surgeon-apothecary. This was ratified by Act of the Scottish Parliament in 1670.

In 1647 he rented rooms in Dickson's Close, Edinburgh, which provided the first regular meeting place for the surgeons.

His apprentices included William Borthwick of Pilmuir, the first of the Edinburgh surgeons known to have studied medicine at Padua and Leiden after admission to Fellowship.

James Borthwick was Deacon of the Incorporation from 1648 to 1651 and again from 1659 to 1661. He was a member of the Scottish Parliament representing Edinburgh. His portrait in the Royal College of Surgeons of Edinburgh is the oldest in the College.

Addition lands and property around Stow we gifted to him in 1670, an event ratified by the Scottish Parliament.

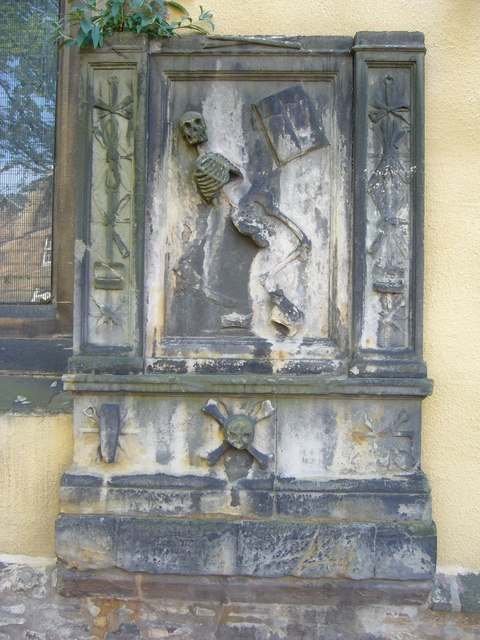
Mural monument at the grave of James Borthwick, Greyfriars Churchyard, Edinburgh.

== Death and burial ==
Borthwick died in 1676 and is buried in Greyfriars Churchyard in Edinburgh, where his grave is marked by an imposing mural monument, erected by his son. This is almost four metres high and two metres wide and features in its centre a full size dancing skeleton carrying a scythe representing the King of Terrors, armed with the scythe of Father Time. Below the skeleton is a crown denoting righteousness. Below this is a carved skull and cross bones, while the side panels have carvings of surgical instruments. The Latin inscription that was placed on the monument is no longer legible, but Robert Monteith was able to record it. The inscription translates as: 'To the memory of his father, James Borthwick of Stow, lawful son of the Cruixtoun family, most famous Chirurgeon Apothecary, Mr James Borthwick his eldest son in a mournful mind placed this monument.'
