= Patrick Stewart Boulter =

British general surgeon, who later specialised in breast surgery

Professor Patrick Stewart Boulter FRCS, FRCSEd
- Born: 28 May 1927; Annan, Scotland
- Died: 30 November 2009 (aged 82); Cumbria, England
- Education: Carlisle Grammar School; Guy's Hospital Medical School
- Occupation: Surgeon
- Known for: Presidency Royal College of Surgeons of Edinburgh
- Medical career
- Profession: General surgeon
- Institutions: Royal Surrey County Hospital
- Sub-specialties: Breast surgery
- Research: Screening for breast cancer

Patrick Stewart Boulter FRCS, FRCSEd (28 May 1927 – 30 November 2009) was a general surgeon in Guildford, England. He developed a sub-speciality interest in breast surgery and was one of the pioneers in the UK of screening for breast cancer. He served as president of the Royal College of Surgeons of Edinburgh from 1991 to 1994.

== Early life ==
He was born in 1927 in Annan, Dumfriesshire, Scotland, His father Frederick Charles Boulter was a civil engineer, and his mother was Flora Victoria (née Black). He was educated initially at King’s College School, Wimbledon. When his parents moved to Carlisle he attended Carlisle Grammar School, which had close links to Carlisle Cathedral and subsequently became Trinity School. While at school he developed a love of the outdoors and walking, hill climbing and mountaineering were to become pastimes which he continued to enjoy for the rest of his life. His decision to study medicine was influenced by a visit to the operating theatre in the local hospital. He began medical studies at Guy's Hospital Medical School but these were interrupted when he was called up for National Service, with the King's Own Scottish Borderers. Because of his medical connections he was seconded to the Royal Army Medical Corps working in the operating department, mainly in Colchester Hospital in Essex. While waiting to return to his medical studies at Guy's, he worked at the Cumberland Infirmary, Carlisle, where his admiration for the surgeon Bill McKechnie decided him to pursue a career in surgery. After completing his studies in London, in 1955 he graduated MB BS with honours in both medicine and surgery and won both the University of London gold medal and the Royal College of Surgeons of England Handcock prize.

== Surgical career ==
After house officer posts at Guy's Hospital he became a lecturer in anatomy at Guy’s l Medical School. He became a Fellow of the Royal Colleges of England and Edinburgh in 1958. His surgical training was at the Middlesex Hospital and Guy’s Hospital training under Sir Hedley Atkins. He became a consultant general surgeon at the Royal Surrey County Hospital, Guildford in 1962 developing a sub-speciality interest in endocrinology and breast cancer. His unit pioneered a screening programme for breast cancer in south-west Surrey in 1978, which became known as the Guildford Breast Screening Project. This involved recruiting around 100 volunteers to encourage women to participate. In 1983 they reported the results on over 24,000 women who took part. The Guildford centre was one of seven that took part in the first major multicentre UK trial of screening for breast cancer. The results of this trial were an important part of the evidence presented in the Forrest Report (1986) which led to the setting up of the UK national breast cancer screening programme 1988, the first such national breast screening programme in the world.

Boulter took a particular interest in training young surgeons not only from Britain but from around the world. He was a prime mover in the establishment of the Guildford Postgraduate Centre which opened in 1964.

== Honours and awards ==
He was made honorary professor in surgical science at the University of Surrey at Guildford. The university awarded him the honorary degree of doctor of the university (D Univ) in 1996. He was awarded honorary fellowships by the Royal Australasian College of Surgeons, the Royal College of Surgeons in Ireland, and the South African and Hong Kong College of Surgeons.

== Family ==
He married Patricia Mary Eckersley (née Barlow) in 1946. They had two daughters, Jennifer and Anne.
He retired to the Lake District, close to Penrith, where he died on 30 November 2009.
