= James Russell (surgeon) =

Scottish surgeon (1754–1836)

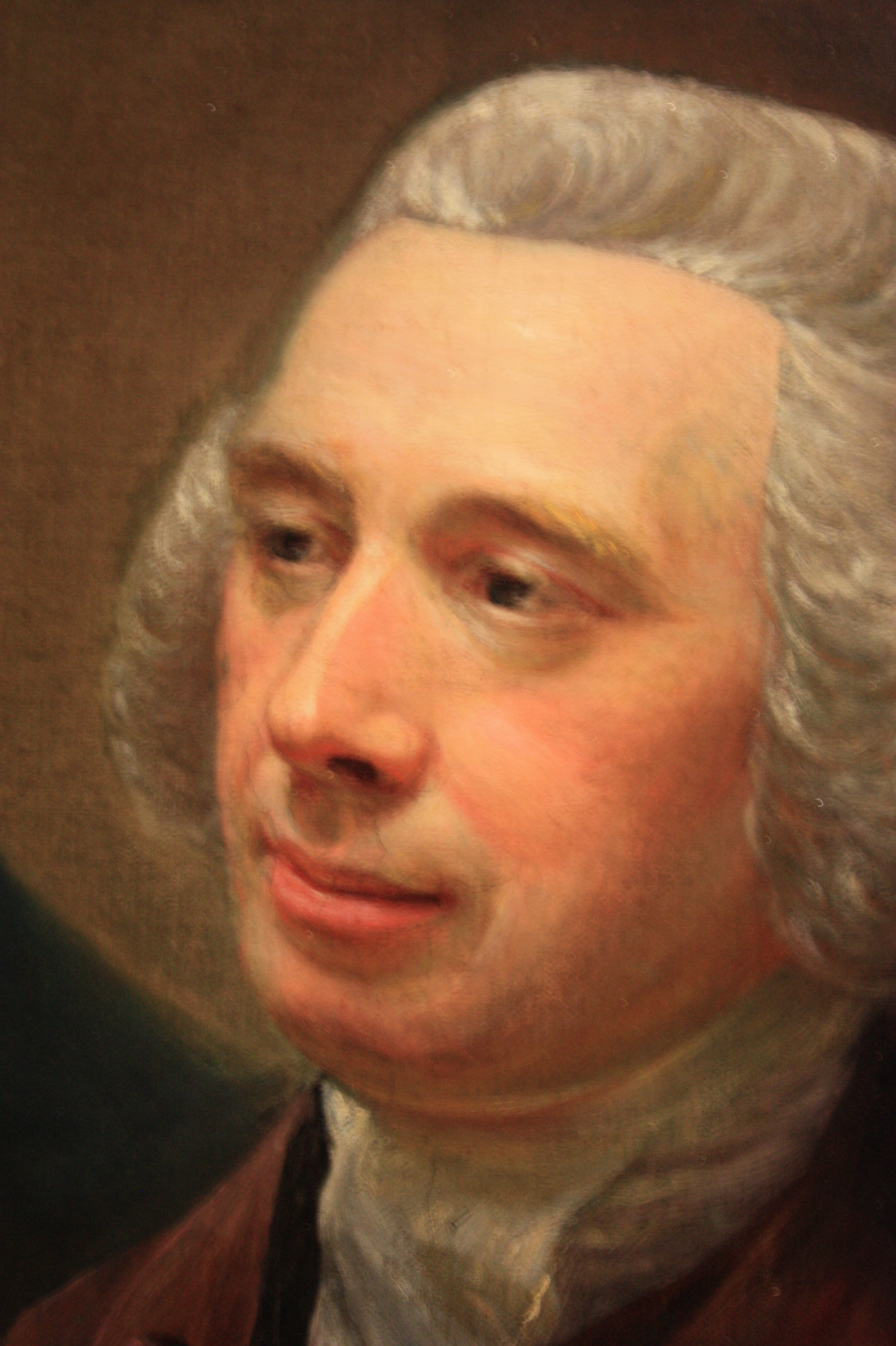
James Russell by David Martin (detail) 1769, aged around 25

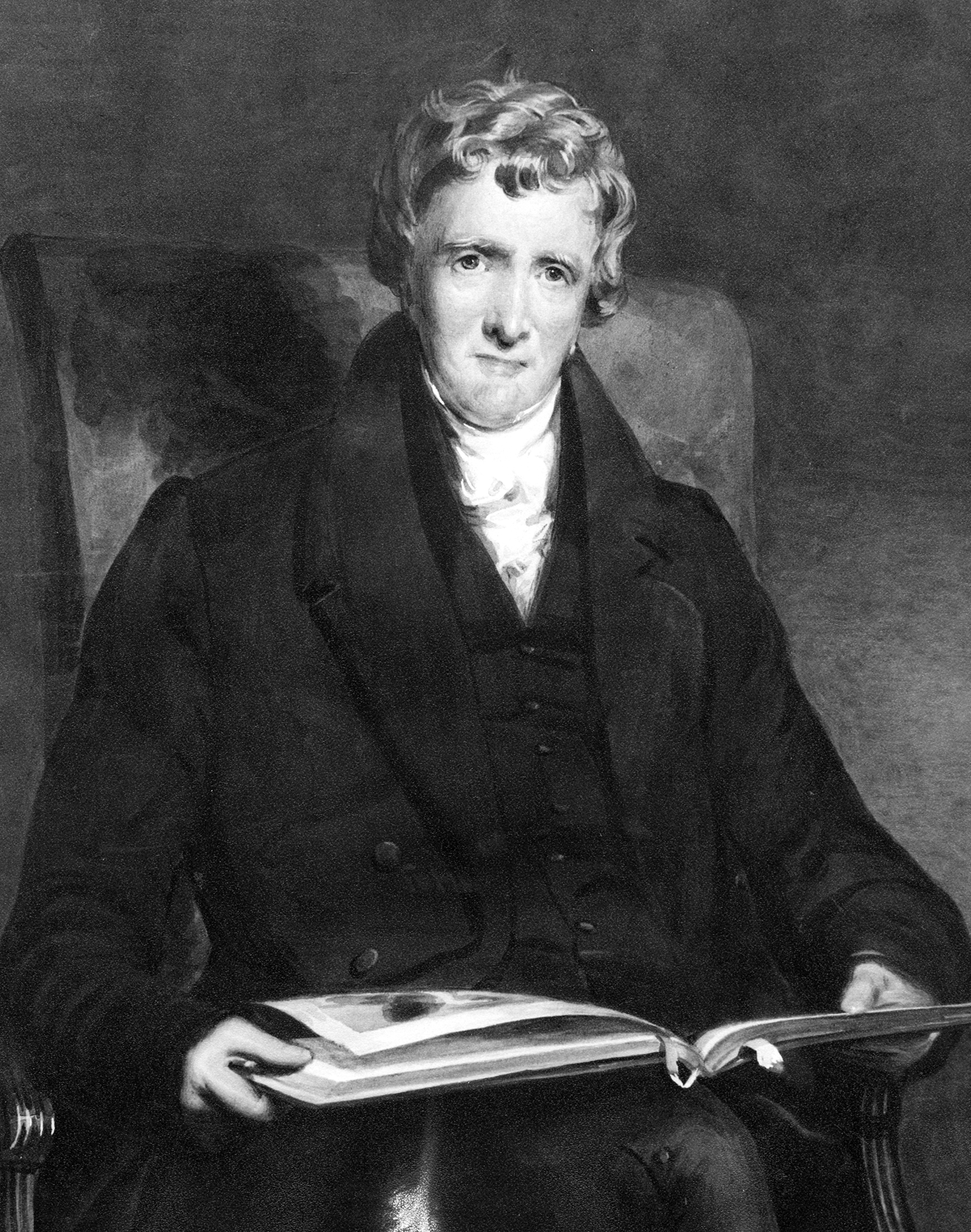
Portrait of James Russell by Sir John Watson Gordon

James Russell FRSE RSA (1754–1836) was a Scottish surgeon who was the first professor of clinical surgery at the University of Edinburgh. He was president of the Royal College of Surgeons of Edinburgh and was a co-founder of the Royal Society of Edinburgh. In 1805 he published one of the earliest descriptions of direct inguinal hernia. His collection of anatomical specimens was donated to the Surgeon's Hall in Edinburgh and is now known as the James Russell Collection.

== Early life ==
He was born in Edinburgh. His father, also James Russell (d 1773), was a surgeon who became Deacon (President) of the Incorporation of Surgeons in 1752. He gave up his surgical career to take up the Chair of Natural Philosophy at the University of Edinburgh in 1764 succeeding Adam Ferguson who had become Professor of Moral Philosophy. James Russell senior was a cousin of the chemist Joseph Black. He married Margaret Balfour of Pilrig, great aunt to Robert Louis Stevenson. Their son, James Russell, was educated at the Royal High School from 1761 to 1764 and then studied medicine at Edinburgh University.

== Surgical career ==
James Russell followed his father into a surgical career. He became a Fellow of the Incorporation of Surgeons in 1777, a year before it became the Royal College of Surgeons of Edinburgh. From 1780 to 1792 he served as college librarian and in 1796 was elected president of the college. From 1800 he was appointed one of six surgeons-in-ordinary on the staff of Edinburgh Royal Infirmary. In 1803 he published an article "Singular variety of Hernia" in which he gave a clear description of direct inguinal hernia, one of the earliest published accounts of the difference between the direct and indirect varieties. in 1804 all six Infirmary surgeons were given the right to deliver lectures on surgery. Russell had been giving a private surgery lecture course since 1786 and his lectures appear to have been well received. In an effort to expand this aspect of his career, he was drawn into the controversy over the establishment of a Chair of Clinical Surgery at the University of Edinburgh.

== Founding of a Chair of Clinical Surgery ==
For many years the Incorporation of Surgeons had lobbied the Town Council for a chair of clinical surgery to be established in the university. This had been successfully resisted by Alexander Monro secundus and his son Monro tertius who had both taken the titles of Professor of Anatomy and Surgery although neither had ever been a practising surgeon. In 1802 Russell petitioned the Town Council to be appointed the first professor of clinical surgery and the Professors Monro withdrew their opposition. Russell was appointed to the new chair in 1804 on a salary of £50 per year, obtained from the Crown, making this a regius chair. Russell continued in the chair until the age of 78 and when he retired in 1833 he made it a condition that his successor should pay him a salary of £300 per year for his lifetime. Robert Liston, a strong contender for the chair, refused "in rather coarse terms" to pay this sum and James Syme was appointed as Russell's successor.

== Offices held ==
Russell was president of Royal Medical Society in 1780. In 1783 he was a founder member of the Royal Society of Edinburgh along with his cousin Joseph Black. Russell served as the society's vice-president from 1823 to 1833 and was president of the Royal College of Surgeons of Edinburgh in 1796–1797. In 1791 he was elected a member of the Harveian Society of Edinburgh and in 1796 he was elected a member of the Aesculapian Club.

== Later life and death ==
In later life, and until retiral, he lived with his family at 30 Abercromby Place, facing Queen Street Gardens in Edinburgh's New Town.

He retired in 1833 aged 79. He died on 14 August 1836 at Bangholm Bower House in Trinity, Edinburgh and was buried in Greyfriars Kirkyard in the city centre.

== Family ==
In 1798 he married Eleanor Oliver. His son James Russell (1801–1862) followed his father into a surgical career, qualifying MD from the University of Edinburgh and becoming a Fellow of the Royal College of Surgeons of Edinburgh and a Fellow of the Royal Society of Edinburgh. His daughter Elanor Russel married James Henderson, later a Free Church minister and Moderator.
