= Alexander Miles (surgeon) =

Scottish surgeon

- Alexander Miles
- Born: 21 May 1865; Leith, Scotland
- Died: 9 April 1953 (aged 87); Edinburgh
- Citizenship: British
- Education: George Watson's College; University of Edinburgh
- Occupation: Surgeon
- Known for: Surgical teaching and writing
- Medical career
- Institutions: Royal Infirmary of Edinburgh
- Notable works: Manual of Surgery; The Edinburgh School of Surgery before Lister

Alexander Miles MD, LL.D, FRCSEd (21 May 1865 – 9 April 1953) was a Scottish surgeon who worked at the Royal Infirmary of Edinburgh. He was known for the quality of his surgical teaching, for his role as a medical journal editor and as the author of popular surgical textbooks and books on surgical history. He was elected President of the Royal College of Surgeons of Edinburgh.

== Early life ==
Alexander Miles was born at Leith, Scotland on 21 May 1865, the son of James Miles and his wife Marion (née Kinghorn). He was educated at George Watson's College, Edinburgh and at the University of Edinburgh, where he graduated MB, CM in 1888. He was elected a Fellow of the Royal College of Surgeons of Edinburgh ( FRCSEd). in 1890. The following year he graduated M.D. being awarded a gold medal for his thesis and winning the Syme Surgical Fellowship from the University of Edinburgh.

== Surgical career ==
His surgical training followed a traditional pattern. He was house surgeon in the Royal Infirmary of Edinburgh, and progressed to clinical tutor. In 1898 Miles was appointed assistant surgeon to the Infirmary and surgeon to Leith Hospital. During this time, as was common, he taught a course in surgery and in operative surgery in the Edinburgh Extramural School of Medicine, teaching classes at Surgeons’ Hall. Miles was appointed surgeon to the Royal Infirmary of Edinburgh in 1909, a post which he held for the statutory fifteen years after which he became consulting surgeon in 1924.

== Other offices ==
In 1899 he was elected a member of the Harveian Society of Edinburgh. He was Secretary and Treasurer of the Royal College of Surgeons of Edinburgh and was elected its President in 1927. He represented the college on the General Medical Council for fifteen years till his retirement in 1943, He served the University of Edinburgh as a member of the University Court, and as a Curator of Patronage, the committee which advised on the appointment to university chairs. In 1924 he was elected a member of the Aesculapian Club. In 1925 the university conferred upon him the honorary degree of LL.D. He was chairman of the board of the Astley-Ainslie Hospital, a convalescent and rehabilitation hospital which had been established in 1921.

== Medical author ==
Miles contributed several important books. With Alexis Thomson, the Professor of Systematic Surgery he published The Manual of Surgery in 1904. This proved popular and ran to nine editions, the later editions being jointly edited by Professor Sir David Wilkie, who had succeeded Thomson in the Chair of Systematic Surgery. The sixth edition of this work is available online., A companion volume Operative Surgery by the same authors was published in 1920 and the third edition, published in 1950, was jointly edited by Sir James Learmonth, who now held the surgical chairs at Edinburgh University. Miles, by that stage aged 84, contributed a new chapter to the volume. His handbook for surgical nurses Surgical Ward Work and Nursing first published in 1893 ran to seven editions the last published in 1943. The second edition is now available online. His interest in surgical history led to other books of which The Edinburgh School of Surgery before Lister, was the best known. C. H. Creswell, Librarian of the Royal College of Surgeons of Edinburgh, had been researching the archives of the college with a view to writing a college history. Cresswell was called up for military service in 1914, and died on active service in 1918. He had written earlier chapters but Miles and Arthur Logan Turner completed the task, and, in 1926, published The Royal College of Surgeons of Edinburgh; historical notes from 1505 to 1905 under Creswell's name. As well as contributing many papers to the surgical literature he was joint editor of the Edinburgh Medical Journal from 1911 to 1935.

== Personal life and death ==
He married Helen J. Greig, who survived him along with their daughter. His son Hamish predeceased him. Miles died on 9 April 1953.

== Selected publications ==
- Operative surgery, with Sir James Learmonth; London, Oxford Univ. Press, 1950
- Surgical ward work and nursing; a handbook for nurses and others; London, The Scientific Press, Ltd 1921
- The Edinburgh school of surgery before Lister; London : A. & C. Black, 1918.
- Manual of surgery with Alexis Thomson; London : Pentland, 1915.
- A Guide to the Study of Medicine. Oliver & Boyd: Edinburgh, London, 1925.
