= William Borthwick (surgeon) =

Scottish surgeon

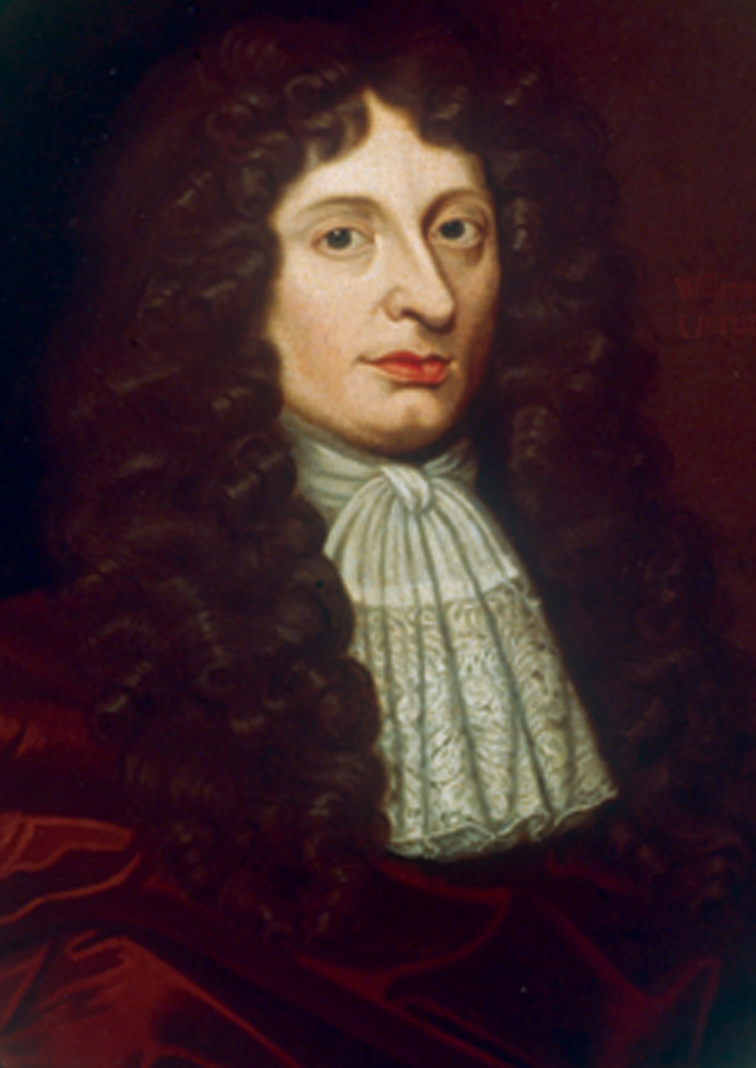
Portrait of William Borthwick in c. 1665

William Borthwick of Pilmuir (1641-1689) was a Scottish surgeon who, having studied at Leiden and Padua, was the first to bring an international perspective to the Incorporation of Surgeons of Edinburgh. He served as Deacon (President) of the Incorporation from 1675-1677 and again from 1681-1683.

== Surgical education and training ==
William Borthwick was surgical apprentice to James Borthwick, who would later become his father-in-law. On 15 November 1665, he was elected a Freeman or Fellow of the Incorporation of Surgeons of Edinburgh. He went on to study at Padua in 1666 and then at the University of Leyden, where at the age of 26 he matriculated in September 1667.

== Military career ==
On 16 June 1679, Borthwick was commissioned as "Chirurgeon Major of His Majesty's Forces in Scotland" and he was listed as surgeon to the 21st Regiment of Foot (Royal Scots Fusiliers) in 1682.

== Surgical career ==
Borthwick was Deacon (President) of the Incorporation from 1675 to 1677 and again from 1681 to 1683. In 1677, he was appointed with Robert Sibbald, Andrew Balfour and Archibald Stevenson, (all of whom were to be made Fellows of the Royal College of Physicians of Edinburgh when it was founded in 1681), to be ‘visitors’ of the ‘phisicall gardin’. This garden for medicinal herbs was in land, which belonged to the Trinity Hospital. The site of this garden can be found by platform 11 in Edinburgh Waverley Station, where there is a commemorative plaque. The garden was looked after by James Sutherland, later Professor of Botany at the University. In 1687, John Monro was ‘booked as servant in order to be prenticed’ to William Borthwick, the first connection the Monro family had with surgery.

== Properties ==
Borthwick owned the Pilmuir estate in East Lothian. His country home, Pilmuir House, was built in 1627. Some 300 years later it was bought by Sir Henry Wade who left it in Trust to the Royal College of Surgeons of Edinburgh. In addition to his property at Pilmuir, Borthwick owned a stone house in Edinburgh which had a dining room, "four bedchambers a dark closet and a kitchen", which had cost 6600 merks Scots (£330 sterling).

== Family and death ==
After finishing his apprenticeship he married Marionn Brothwick, eldest daughter of his surgical master, on 12 June 1666 at Edinburgh. Their daughter Margaret married John Campbell of Knockreoch who was to become Lord Provost of the City of Edinburgh on three occasions - in 1715, 1719 and 1723. William Borthwick married on two subsequent occasions, Marjory Steuart, daughter of Harie Steuart, brother of Sir Thomas Steuart of Grantully and lastly Eupheme Young.

== Legacy ==
Borthwick was the first Edinburgh surgeon to bring an international perspective to the Incorporation of Surgeons of Edinburgh. Having studied at Padua and Leyden, he encouraged one of his apprentices, John Monro to study in Leyden. Monro returned to Scotland, inspired and determined to set up a medical school in Edinburgh based on the Leiden model.
