= Chalmers Hospital, Edinburgh =

Chalmers Hospital
- NHS Lothian
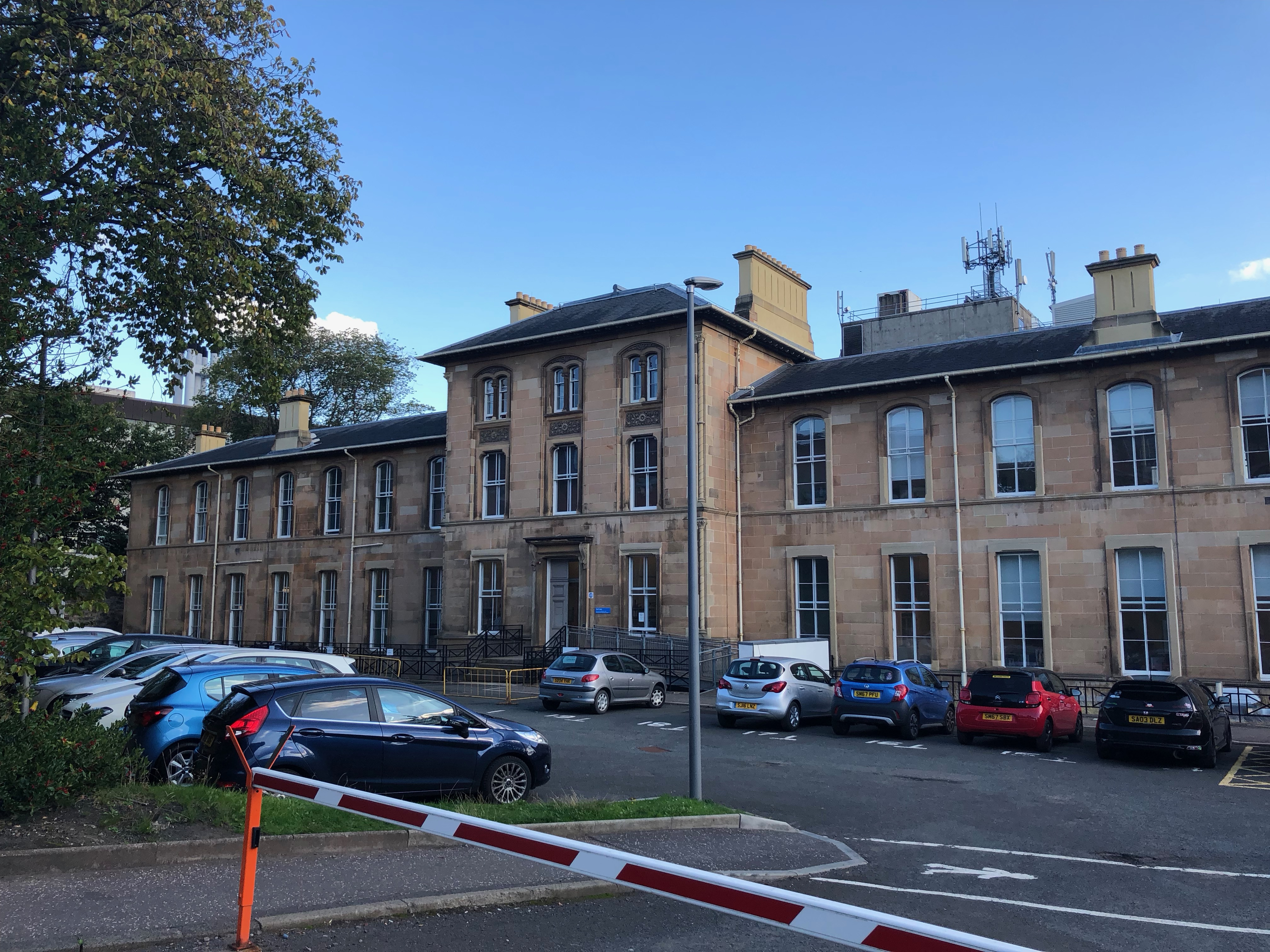
- Hospital building

- Shown in Edinburgh

Geography
- Location: Edinburgh, Scotland
- Coordinates: 55.9444°N 3.1981°W

Organisation
- Care system: NHS Scotland
- Type: Sexual Health Centre

Services
- Emergency department: No

Links
- Website: Website
- Lists: Hospitals in Scotland

Chalmers Hospital is a hospital located in Chalmers Street, in the centre of Edinburgh. It is operated by NHS Lothian.

== History ==
The hospital was made possible following a bequest from George Chalmers (1773-1836), an Edinburgh plumber and lead merchant and a City burgess, "for the express purpose of founding a new infirmary or sick and hurt hospital". Construction on the new facility, which was designed by John Dick Peddie, began in 1860. It opened in February 1864 and was extended in 1872.

The hospital was used for civilian casualties during the Second World War. It joined the National Health Service as a general hospital in 1948, but, following the publication of a report for NHS Lothian in 2007, it was changed into a sexual health centre in 2011.

== Services ==
The hospital serves as NHS Lothian’s Sexual and Reproductive Health Service's centre. Services include contraception advice and supplies, emergency contraception, free condoms, STI testing and treatment, HIV including post exposure prophylaxis (PEP), pregnancy testing, referral for termination of pregnancy, community gynaecology, menopause and premenstrual syndrome treatment, gay men's clinics, colposcopy, young people's clinics, advice on sexual problems, and support following sexual assault.
