= Almost holomorphic modular form =

In mathematics, almost holomorphic modular forms, also called nearly holomorphic modular forms, are a generalization of modular forms that are polynomials in 1/Im(τ) with coefficients that are holomorphic functions of τ. A quasimodular form is the holomorphic part of an almost holomorphic modular form. An almost holomorphic modular form is determined by its holomorphic part, so the operation of taking the holomorphic part gives an isomorphism between the spaces of almost holomorphic modular forms and quasimodular forms. The archetypal examples of quasimodular forms are the Eisenstein series E_{2}(τ) (the holomorphic part of the almost holomorphic modular form E_{2}(τ) – 3/πIm(τ)), and derivatives of modular forms.

In terms of representation theory, modular forms correspond roughly to highest weight vectors of certain discrete series representations of SL_{2}(R), while almost holomorphic or quasimodular forms correspond roughly to other (not necessarily highest weight) vectors of these representations.

== Definitions ==
To simplify notation this section treats the level 1 case; the extension to higher levels is straightforward.

A level 1 almost holomorphic modular form is a function f on the upper half plane with the properties:

- f transforms like a modular form: $f((a\tau+b)/(c\tau+d)) = (c\tau+d)^kf(\tau)$ for some integer k called the weight, for any elements of SL_{2}(Z) (that is: a, b, c, d are integers with ad - bc = 1).
- As a function of q=e^{2πiτ}, f is a polynomial in 1/Im(τ) with coefficients that are holomorphic functions of q.

A level 1 quasimodular form is defined to be the constant term of an almost holomorphic modular form (considered as a polynomial in 1/Im(τ)).

== Structure ==
The ring of almost holomorphic modular forms of level 1 is a polynomial ring over the complex numbers in the three generators $E_2(\tau)-3/\pi\Im(\tau), E_4(\tau), E_6(\tau)$. Similarly the ring of quasimodular forms of level 1 is a polynomial ring over the complex numbers in the three generators $E_2(\tau), E_4(\tau), E_6(\tau)$.

Quasimodular forms can be interpreted as sections of certain jet bundles.

== Derivatives ==
Ramanujan observed that the derivative of any quasimodular form is another quasimodular form. For example,

$$\begin{align}
\frac{1}{2\pi i}\frac{dE_2}{d\tau} & =  \frac{E_2^2-E_4}{12} \\[6pt]
\frac{1}{2\pi i}\frac{dE_4}{d\tau} & =  \frac{E_2E_4-E_6}{3} \\[6pt]
\frac{1}{2\pi i}\frac{dE_6}{d\tau} & =  \frac{E_2E_6-E_4^2}{2}
\end{align}$$

As the field generated by quasimodular forms of some level has transcendence degree 3 over C, this implies that any quasimodular form satisfies some nonlinear differential equation of order 3. For example, the Eisenstein series E_{2} satisfies the Chazy equation (give or take a few constants).

== See also ==
- Maass–Shimura operator
