= Ring of modular forms =

Algebraic object

In mathematics, the ring of modular forms associated to a subgroup Γ of the special linear group SL(2, Z) is the graded ring generated by the modular forms of Γ. The study of rings of modular forms describes the algebraic structure of the space of modular forms.

== Definition ==
Let Γ be a subgroup of SL(2, Z) that is of finite index and let M_{k}(Γ) be the vector space of modular forms of weight k. The ring of modular forms of Γ is the graded ring $M(\Gamma) = \bigoplus_{k \geq 0} M_k(\Gamma)$.

== Example ==
The ring of modular forms of the full modular group SL(2, Z) is freely generated by the Eisenstein series E_{4} and E_{6}. In other words, M_{k}(Γ) is isomorphic as a $\mathbb{C}$-algebra to $\mathbb{C}[E_4, E_6]$, which is the polynomial ring of two variables over the complex numbers.

== Properties ==
The ring of modular forms is a graded Lie algebra since the Lie bracket $[f,g] = kfg' - \ell f'g$ of modular forms f and g of respective weights k and ℓ is a modular form of weight k + ℓ + 2. A bracket can be defined for the n-th derivative of modular forms and such a bracket is called a Rankin–Cohen bracket.

=== Congruence subgroups of SL(2, Z) ===
In 1973, Pierre Deligne and Michael Rapoport showed that the ring of modular forms M(Γ) is finitely generated when Γ is a congruence subgroup of SL(2, Z).

In 2003, Lev Borisov and Paul Gunnells showed that the ring of modular forms M(Γ) is generated in weight at most 3 when $\Gamma$ is the congruence subgroup $\Gamma_1(N)$ of prime level N in SL(2, Z) using the theory of toric modular forms. In 2014, Nadim Rustom extended the result of Borisov and Gunnells for $\Gamma_1(N)$ to all levels N and also demonstrated that the ring of modular forms for the congruence subgroup $\Gamma_0(N)$ is generated in weight at most 6 for some levels N.

In 2015, John Voight and David Zureick-Brown generalized these results: they proved that the graded ring of modular forms of even weight for any congruence subgroup Γ of SL(2, Z) is generated in weight at most 6 with relations generated in weight at most 12. Building on this work, in 2016, Aaron Landesman, Peter Ruhm, and Robin Zhang showed that the same bounds hold for the full ring (all weights), with the improved bounds of 5 and 10 when Γ has some nonzero odd weight modular form.

=== General Fuchsian groups ===
A Fuchsian group Γ corresponds to the orbifold obtained from the quotient $\Gamma \backslash \mathbb{H}$ of the upper half-plane $\mathbb{H}$. By a stacky generalization of Riemann's existence theorem, there is a correspondence between the ring of modular forms of Γ and a particular section ring closely related to the canonical ring of a stacky curve.

There is a general formula for the weights of generators and relations of rings of modular forms due to the work of Voight and Zureick-Brown and the work of Landesman, Ruhm, and Zhang. Let $e_i$ be the stabilizer orders of the stacky points of the stacky curve (equivalently, the cusps of the orbifold $\Gamma \backslash \mathbb{H}$) associated to Γ. If Γ has no nonzero odd weight modular forms, then the ring of modular forms is generated in weight at most $6 \max(1, e_1, e_2, \ldots, e_r)$ and has relations generated in weight at most $12 \max(1, e_1, e_2, \ldots, e_r)$. If Γ has a nonzero odd weight modular form, then the ring of modular forms is generated in weight at most $\max(5, e_1, e_2, \ldots, e_r)$ and has relations generated in weight at most $2\max(5, e_1, e_2, \ldots, e_r)$.

== Applications ==
In string theory and supersymmetric gauge theory, the algebraic structure of the ring of modular forms can be used to study the structure of the Higgs vacua of four-dimensional gauge theories with N = 1 supersymmetry. The stabilizers of superpotentials in N = 4 supersymmetric Yang–Mills theory are rings of modular forms of the congruence subgroup Γ(2) of SL(2, Z).
