= John Mortland =

Scottish advocate (1751–1807)

John Mortland or Morthland of Rindmuir FRSE (1751–1807) was a Scottish advocate who was one of the joint founders of the Royal Society of Edinburgh in 1783.

== Life ==
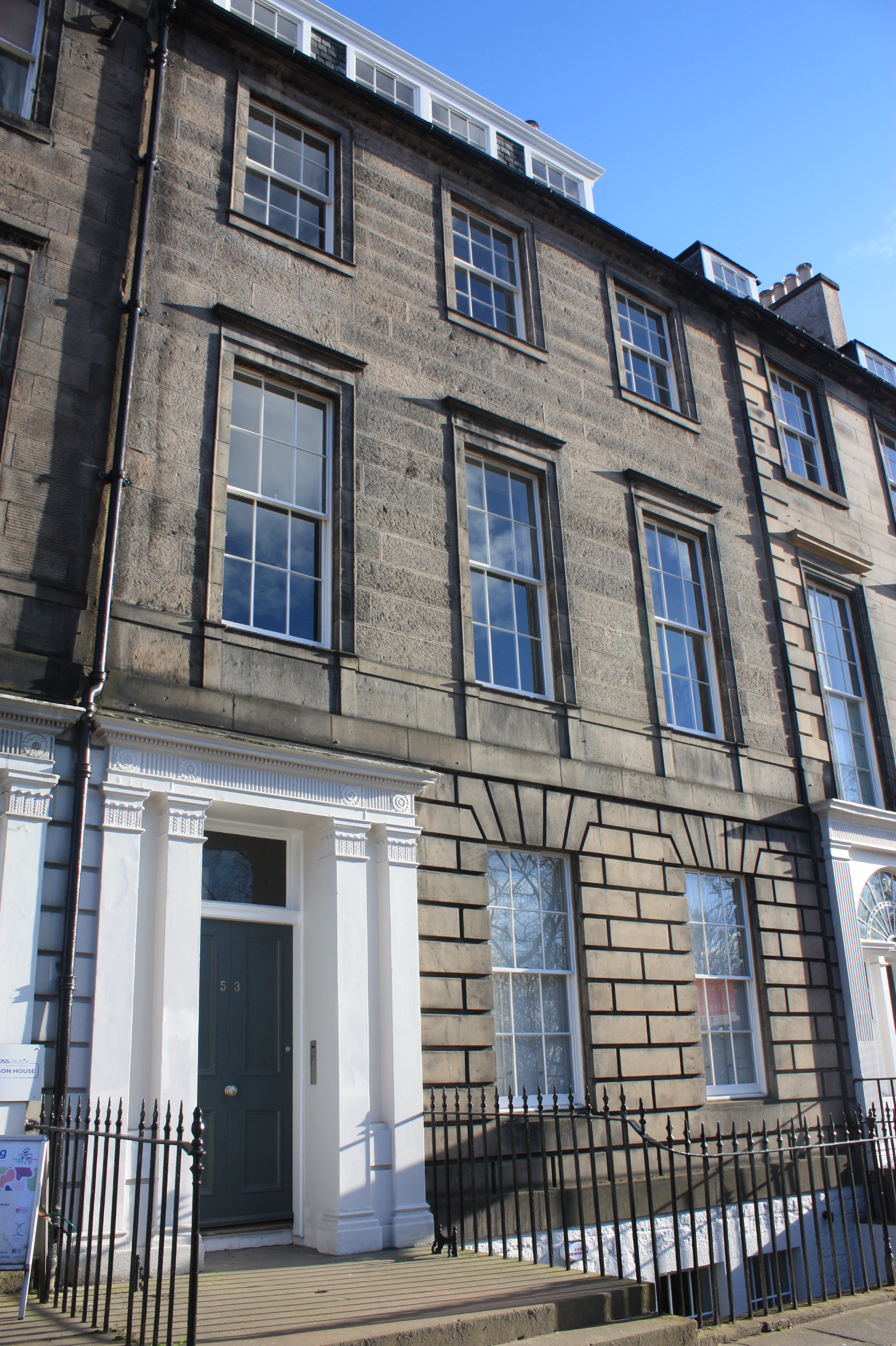
53 Queen Street, Edinburgh

He was born on 14 January 1751 at Rindmuir House in Glasgow the son of Matthew Morthland (born 1714), Professor of Oriental Languages at Glasgow University, and his wife, Anna Simpson, daughter of Rev Dr John Simpson. He studied law at Glasgow University. He was a member of the Speculative Society and president 1774-5.

He qualified as an advocate in 1773 and rose to be Depute Advocate of Scotland in 1783.

In 1784, he was living and working at a property on George Street in Edinburgh's Dirst New Town.

In 1787, he married Mary Menzies and moved to a larger property at 53 Queen Street.

Mortland was a member of the Society of the Friends of the People, a Whiggish organization which advocated for Parliamentary reform and universal suffrage. He attended the first general convention of the Scottish Friends of the People in Edinburgh in December 1792. He was however a prosecution witness in the August 1793 trial of Thomas Muir of Huntershill for sedition.

Mortland was one of the founders of the Scots Chronicle newspaper in 1796. The Chronicle opposed the war on France, and Mortland was sued for libel over a letter published in the paper.

He died in London on 22 March 1807.

Rindmuir House was renamed Rhinmuir House and was successively the home of the Pollok family and from 1901 the Kerr family. It was burnt down in 1995. It lay in the Easterhouse district of Glasgow. His Edinburgh house at Queen Street was later the home of the surgeon James Dunsmure.
