= Robert Alexander Rankin =

Scottish mathematician

Robert Rankin
- Born: 27 October 1915; Garlieston, Scotland
- Died: 27 January 2001 (aged 85); Glasgow, Scotland
- Education: Clare College, Cambridge
- Awards: Senior Whitehead Prize (1987); De Morgan Medal (1998)
- Scientific career
- Fields: Number theory
- Workplaces: University of Cambridge; University of Birmingham; University of Glasgow
- Doctoral advisor: G. H. Hardy and Albert Ingham
- Doctoral students: Michael P. Drazin

Robert Alexander Rankin FRSE FRSAMD (27 October 1915 – 27 January 2001) was a Scottish mathematician who worked in analytic number theory.

== Life ==
Rankin was born in Garlieston in Wigtownshire the son of Rev Oliver Rankin (1885–1954), minister of Sorbie and his wife, Olivia Theresa Shaw. His father took the name Oliver Shaw Rankin on marriage and became Professor of Old Testament Language, Literature and Theology in the University of Edinburgh.

Rankin was educated at Fettes College then studied mathematics at Clare College, Cambridge, graduating in 1937. At Cambridge he was particularly influenced by J.E. Littlewood and A.E. Ingham.

Rankin was elected a Fellow of Clare College in 1939, but his career was interrupted by the Second World War, during which he worked first for the Ministry of Supply then on rocketry research at Fort Halstead. In 1945 he returned to Cambridge as an assistant lecturer, and then moved to the University of Birmingham in 1951 as Mason professor of mathematics. In 1954 he became Professor of Mathematics, Glasgow University, retiring in 1982.

In 1954 he was elected a Fellow of the Royal Society of Edinburgh. His proposers were William M. Smart, Robert Garry, James Norman Davidson and Robert Pollock Gillespie. He served as Vice President 1960 to 1963 and won the Society's Keith Prize for the period 1961–63.

Rankin had a continuing interest in Srinivasa Ramanujan, working initially with G.H. Hardy on Ramanujan's unpublished notes. His research interests lay in the distribution of prime numbers and in modular forms. In 1939 he developed what is now known as the Rankin–Selberg method. In 1977 Cambridge University Press published Rankin's Modular Forms and Functions. In his review, Marvin Knopp wrote:

For, as much as any recent exposition of modular functions, this book succeeds in getting near the research frontier, and in some instances even reaches it – no small feat in this theory. Only someone of Rankin's stature as a research mathematician and experience in the classroom could aspire to such an accomplishment in a self-contained work – beginning with first principles.

In 1987 Rankin received the Senior Whitehead Prize from the London Mathematical Society.

Rankin died in Glasgow on 27 January 2001.

== Family ==
In 1942 he married Mary Ferrier Llewellyn.

== See also ==
- Rankin–Cohen bracket

== Books ==
- An introduction to mathematical analysis, Pergamon Press 1963; Dover 2007.
- The modular group and its subgroups, Madras, Ramanujan Institute, 1969.
- Modular forms and functions, Cambridge University Press 1977
