= James Dunsmure (physician) =

Scottish physician (1846–1907)

- Born: 1 January 1846; Edinburgh, Scotland
- Died: 5 July 1907 (aged 61); Edinburgh, Scotland
- Occupations: Physician, obstetrician
- Known for: President Royal College of Surgeons of Edinburgh

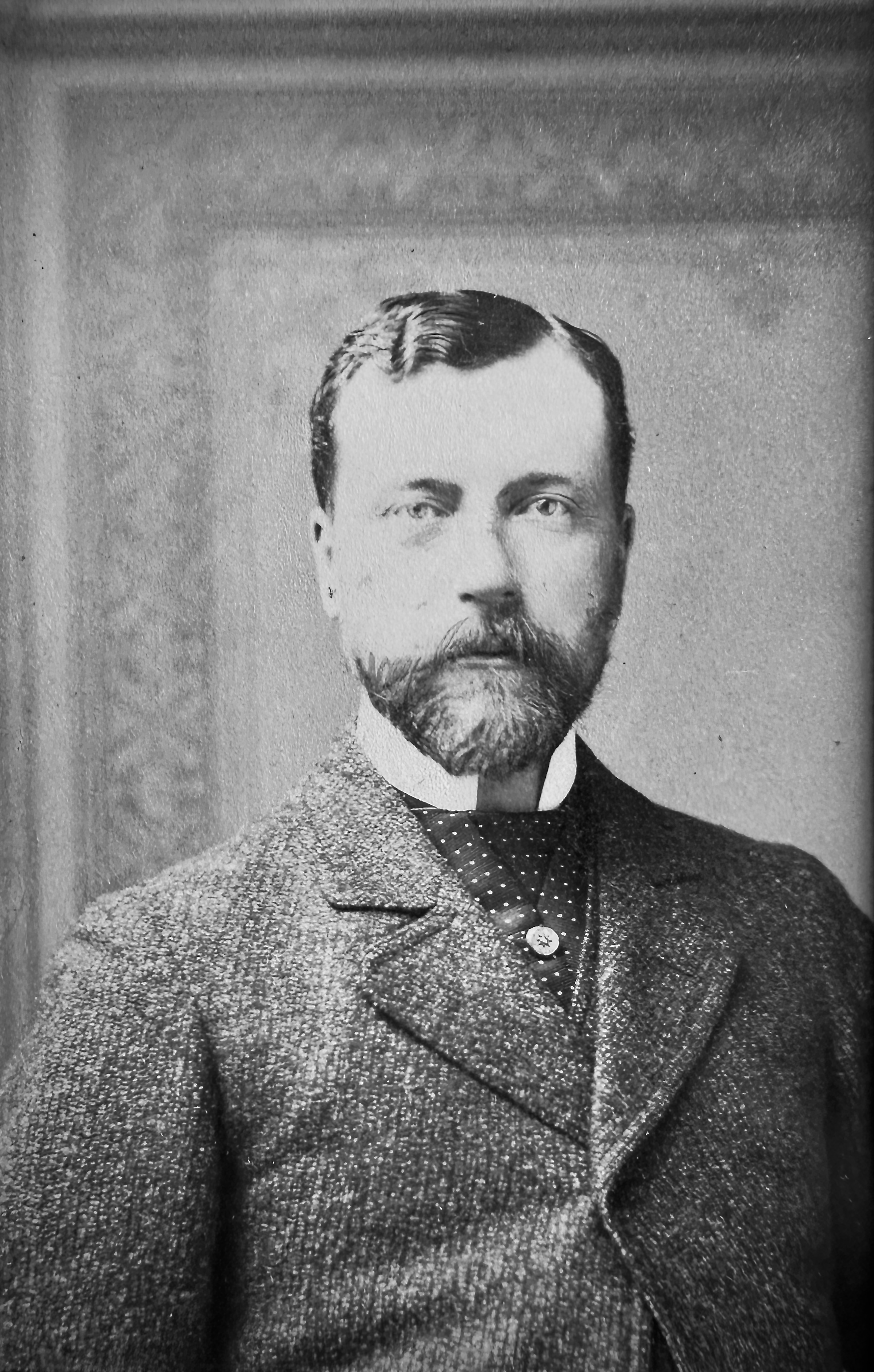
Dunsmure in middle age

James Dunsmure FRCSEd (1 January 1846 – 5 July 1907) was a Scottish physician and obstetrician who, as his father had done before him, served as President of the Royal College of Surgeons of Edinburgh.

== Early life and education ==
James Dunsmure was born in Edinburgh on 1 January 1846 and baptised on 5 February that year. He was the son of James Dunsmure (1814 -1886) and his wife Catherine (née Hill). His father was a surgeon in Edinburgh and had been president of the Royal College of Surgeons of Edinburgh (RCSEd). He was educated at the Edinburgh Academy and studied medicine at the University of Edinburgh Medical School, graduating MB, CM in 1867. That same year he became a Licentiate of the RCSEd. As a student he lived in the family home at 53 Queen Street, Edinburgh next door to the obstetrician Sir James Young Simpson, an association which may have influenced his choice of career speciality.

== Career ==
He worked in the Royal Infirmary of Edinburgh (RIE) as house surgeon to Professor James Spence and then as house physician to Dr Daniel Haldane. After further postgraduate experience studying in Berlin, Vienna and Prague, he returned to Edinburgh and qualified MD in 1870 with a thesis entitled Pathology and treatment of strictures of the urethra. In 1871 he became a Fellow of the RCSEd. He joined his father’s Edinburgh practice, specialising in obstetrics and diseases of children. For ten years acted as Physician to the Royal Hospital for Sick Children, and was obstetrician to the New Town Dispensary. When his father retired he took over his practice and also acted as Medical officer to the Trinity College Hospital, Physician to John Watson’s Institution, and surgeon to the Trades Maiden Hospital and to the North British Railway Company.He served as a governor of Donaldson’s Hospital and as a manager of the RIE.

In 1890 he was living at 53 Queen Street, Edinburgh.

== Honours and awards ==
In 1872 he was elected a member of the Harveian Society of Edinburgh and in 1892 he was elected a member of the Aesculapian Club. He was elected president of the RCSEd in 1899. During his term of office the University of Glasgow conferred on him the honorary degree of LL.D. He was a main organiser of the quatercentenary celebration of the RCSEd which took place in 1905.

He died in Edinburgh on 15 July 1907 and is buried in the Dean Cemetery, Edinburgh.

== Family ==
He was married with one daughter. His brother Robert Dunsmure (1852–94) emigrated to Australia where he became a member of the Queensland Legislative Assembly.
