= Jean Chazy =

French mathematician and astronomer

Jean François Chazy (15 August 1882, Villefranche-sur-Saône – 9 March 1955, Paris) was a French mathematician and astronomer.

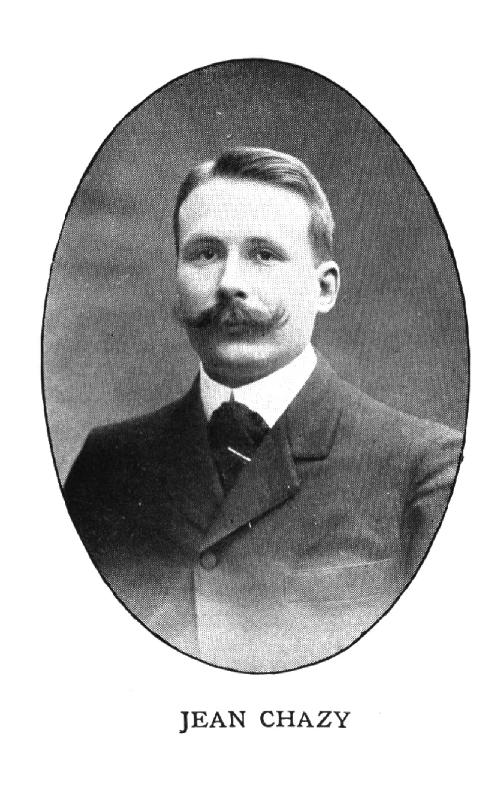

== Life ==
Chazy was the son of a small provincial manufacturer and studied mathematics at the École Normale Supérieure with completion of the agrégation in 1905. He received his doctorate in 1910 with thesis Équations différentielles du troisième ordre et d’ordre supérieur don't l’intégrale générale a ses points critiques fixes. In 1911 he was maître de conférences for mechanics in Grenoble and then in Lille. In World War I he served in the artillery and became famous for accurately predicting the location of the German siege gun which bombarded Paris. After the war he was again professor in the Faculté des Sciences de Lille (which later became the Lille University of Science and Technology). Simultaneously he taught at the Institut industriel du Nord (École Centrale de Lille). In 1923 he was maître de conférences at the École centrale des arts et manufactures in Paris (as well as examiner at the École polytechnique). In 1924 he became professor for mechanics and later for celestial mechanics at the Sorbonne, where he retired in 1953 as professor emeritus.

== Work ==
He worked on celestial mechanics and especially on the three-body problem and the perihelion precession of Mercury's orbit. The problem of explaining Mercury's orbit was solved by Albert Einstein's general relativity theory.

== Honors ==
In 1922 Chazy was awarded the Valz Prize from the French Academy of Sciences for his papers on the three-body problem. He was an Invited Speaker of the ICM in 1924 at Toronto and in 1928 at Bologna. In 1937 he was elected to the Académie des Sciences in the Astronomie section. He was also a member of the Romanian Academy of Sciences and a member of the Belgian Academy of Sciences. In 1934 he was president of the Société Mathématique de France. Since 1952 he was an official member of the Bureau des Longitudes. He was made a commander of the Légion d'honneur.

== Selected works ==
- La théorie de la relativité et la mécanique céleste, vol. 1, 1928, vol. 2, 1930, Gauthier-Villars, Paris
- Cours de mécanique rationnelle, 2 vols., Gauthier-Villars 1933, new edns, 1941/42, 1948, 1952
- Mécanique céleste: équations canoniques et variation des constantes, Presses Universitaires de France, Coll. Euclide, Paris 1953

== See also ==
- Chazy equation
