= Edinburgh Arrow =

The Edinburgh Arrow is an annual clout archery competition held by the Royal Company of Archers, an archery club who act as the Sovereign's Bodyguard in Scotland. The Edinburgh Arrow is the longest-running annual archery competition in the recorded history of the sport. The competition takes its name from the silver arrow which is awarded for first prize.

== List of winners of the Edinburgh Arrow ==
1709 David Drummond, advocate
1710 William Neilson, merchant in Edinburgh
1711 Thomas Kincaid
1712 William Mercer, writer in Edinburgh
1713 James Cockburn, Secretary to the General and Commander-in-Chief
1714 David Wemyss, 4th Earl of Wemyss
1715 Alexander Congalton, merchant in Edinburgh
1716 The Earl of Wigtoun
1727 James Cuming, junior, merchant in Edinburgh
1728 James Freebairn
1729 John Douglas, surgeon in Edinburgh
1730 Andrew Marjoribanks, merchant in Edinburgh
1731 William St Clair of Roslin
1732 James Balfour of Forret
1733 Robert Freebairn, king's printer
1734 George Loch, merchant in Edinburgh
1735 John Rattray, surgeon
1736 Robert Biggar, vintner in Edinburgh
1737 George Loch, merchant in Edinburgh
1738 Alexander Cuming, merchant in Gottenburgh
1739 Hugh Clerk, senior, merchant in Edinburgh
1740 John Douglas, surgeon in Edinburgh
1741 William St Clair of Roslin
1742 Sir Alexander Macdonald, Bart.
1743 John Brown, merchant in Edinburgh
1744 John Rattray, surgeon in Edinburgh
1745 John Mackintosh, merchant in Edinburgh
1746 John Douglas, surgeon
1747 Robert Biggar, merchant
1748 Hugh Clerk, senior
1749 James Hardie, writer in Edinburgh
1750 Robert Douglas, Secretary to the R.C.A.
1751 George Lockhart of Carnwath, President of the council, Major-General of the Royal Scots Archers
1752 Angus Maclachlan of Maclachlan
I753 George Lockhart of Carnwath
1754 Archibald Smart, clothier in Musselburgh
1755 John Sinclair, writer in Edinburgh
1756 Nathaniel Spens, surgeon in Edinburgh
1757 John Murray, druggist-apothecary
1758 Hugh Fraser of Lovat
1759 John Murray, druggist-apothecary
1760 Archibald Smart, clothier in Musselburgh
1761 William St Clair of Roslin
1762 George Lockhart of Carnwath
1763 Charles Lockhart, advocate
1764 Andrew Home, wine merchant
1765 Archibald Smart, clothier in Musselburgh
1766 William Graham of Oartmore
1767 Archibald Smart, clothier in Mussclburgh
1768 The Honourable James Steuart Murray
1769 John Mackintosh, merchant in Edinburgh
1770 John Cuming Ramsay, advocate
1771 Nathaniel Spens, surgeon in Edinburgh
1772 John Macpherson, teacher of music
1773 Charles Macdonald of Largie, advocate
1774 Simon Fraser, W.S.
1775 Robert Wellwood, younger of Garvoch
1776 Thomas Hay, surgeon
1777 Thomas Elder, merchant
1778 Thomas Hay, surgeon
1779 William Trotter, merchant
1780 Thomas Hay, surgeon
1781 William Trotter, merchant
1782 Thomas Elder, merchant
1783 Alexander Brown, keeper of the Advocates' Library
1784 Sir James Pringle of Stitchell, Bart.
1785 James Gray, writer
1786 Nathaniel Spens M.D., physician in Edinburgh
1787 Alexander, Lord Elibank
1788 William Trotter, merchant
1789 Charles Hope, advocate
1790 Henry Jardine, W.S.
1791 Alexander, Lord Elibank
1792 James Mansfield, junior
1793 Dr Thomas Spens, physician in Edinburgh
1794 Captain Cosby Swindell
1795 John Thomson, junior
1796 William Robertson, jeweller
1797 Dr Thomas Spens, Treasurer R.C.A.
1798 Thomas Hay, surgeon
1799 Thomas Hay, surgeon

1800 Thomas Charles Hope, M.D. and Professor of Chemistry
1801 James Hope, W.S.
1802 Charles Cunningham
1803 James Hope, W.S.
1804 James Hope, W.S.
1805 James Hope, W.S.
1806 Charles Cunningham
1807 Dr Thomas Charles Hope
1808 James Hope, W. S. Lieutenant-Colonel 2d Battalion 2d Regiment Royal Edinburgh Volunteers
1809 John Russell, Clerk to the Signet, Secretary R.C.A.
1810 Dr Mackenzie Grieve
1811 Charles Cunningham, W.S.
1812 James Hope, W.S.
1813 John Cay, FRSE, advocate
1814 John Watson, historical and portrait painter
1815 George Corsane Cunningham, H.M. Customs
1816 Thomas Durham Weir, advocate
1817 Sir George S. Mackenzie, Bart.
1818 William Bonar, banker, Edinburgh
1819 John Maxton, banker, Edinburgh
1820 William Bonar, banker
1821 John Linning, Secretary R.C.A.
1822 Albert Cay, merchant
1823 Charles Crossland Hay, merchant
1824 Thomas Ewan, W.S.
1825 Henry George Watson, accountant
1826 John Linning, Secretary to the R.C.A.
1827 James Tod, W.S.
1828 John Maxton, merchant
1829 John Maxton, merchant
1830 Nathaniel Spens, Craigsanquhar
1831 John N. Forman, W.S.
1832 Nathaniel Spens, Craigsanquhar
1833 George Robertson, Deputy-Keeper of Records
1834 James Linning Woodman, W.S.
1835 James Linning Woodman, W.S.
1836 J. N. Forman, W.S.
1837 Alexander Duff, W.S.
1838 Dr James Weir
1839 John Brown Innes, W.S.
1840 John A. Macrae, W.S.
1841 John Brown Innes, W.S.
1842 James Andrew Brown, accountant
1843 John Maxton, merchant
1844 John Stewart, W.S.
1845 George Kellie M'Callum, W.S.
1846 Alexander Thomson of Whitrigg
1847 George Brown Robertson, W.S.
1848 John Gillespie, W.S.
1849 Henry George Watson, accountant
1850 John Kennedy, younger of Underwood
1851 John Kirk, W.S.
1852 James Wilkie, accountant
1853 Dr Douglas Maclagan
1854 Henry George Watson, C.A.
1855 John Phin, S.S.C.
1856 James Adam, advocate
1857 James Jobson Dickson, C.A.
1858 John Gillespie, W.S.
1859 George Steuart, accountant
1860 James Dunsmure, M.D.
1861 James Jobson Dickson, C.A.
1862 John Gillespie, W.S.
1863 Alexander Howe, W.S.
1864 R. Craig Maclagan, M.D.
1865 R. Craig Maclagan, M.D.
1866 James Jobson Dickson, C.A.
1867 George Steuart
1868 George Steuart
1869 George Robertson, C.E.
1870 James Jobson Dickson, C.A.
1871 R. Craig Maclagan, M.D.
1872 James Jobson Dickson, C.A.
1873 James Dunsmure, M.D.
1874 James Jobson Dickson, C.A.
