= Oliver Shaw Rankin =

Reverend Professor Oliver Shaw Rankin
- Born: 28 January 1885; Lamington, Lanarkshire
- Died: 7 February 1954 (aged 69)
- Education: University of Edinburgh
- Occupations: Minister and Theologian
- Known for: Chair of Old Testament Language, Literature and Theology at the University of Edinburgh
- Children: Robert Alexander Rankin
- Relatives: Sir George Claus Rankin (1877-1946)

The Rev. Professor Oliver Shaw Rankin (28 January 1885 – 7 February 1954) was a Scottish scholar and theologian. His research focused on the Old Testament and religious history.

== Family ==
Rankin was born on 28 January 1885 in Lamington, Lanarkshire. His parents were Rev. Robert Rankin and Therese Margaretha Claus. He was the younger brother of Sir George Claus Rankin (1877–1946) who became Chief Justice of Bengal.

Rankin married his material first cousin, Olivia Theresa Shaw, and added her surname to his own. They had three children; Robert Alexander Rankin, Kenneth Walker Rankin, and Olivia Rankin. Rankin died on 7 February 1954.

== Education ==
Rankin was educated at the then John Watson's Institution, Edinburgh, and at George Watson's College, Edinburgh. He studied at the University of Edinburgh where he received his MA (Master of Arts) in 1906, and at Humboldt University of Berlin. He held the Vans Dunlop Scholarship in Hebrew, Arabic and Syriac in 1908. Rankin completed a BD (Bachelor of Divinity) in 1909, and a D.Litt. (Doctor of Letters) in 1928.

== Professional life ==
In 1912, Rankin became Parish Minister in Sorbie, Wigtownshire, where he was ordained. He was a chaplain to German prisoners of war in 1918.

In 1937 Rankin was appointed to the Chair of Old Testament Language, Literature and Theology at the University of Edinburgh. He gave his inaugural lecture in 1948. He corresponded with Martin Luther King Jr. on behalf of the Faculty of Divinity, when King applied to undertake a PhD at the New College in 1950.

Archival collections relating to Rankin and his research reside at the New College Library (University of Edinburgh), and at the National Archives in Kew.

== Publications ==
Rankin's known publications include:

- The origins of the festival of Hannukah (1930) which grew out of his D.Litt. thesis in 1928
- Israel's wisdom literature: its bearing on theology and the history of religion (1936)
- Jewish religious polemic: a study of documents here rendered in English (published posthumously 1956).
