= James Drummond Young, Lord Drummond Young =

Scottish judge

The Right Honourable Lord Drummond Young PC
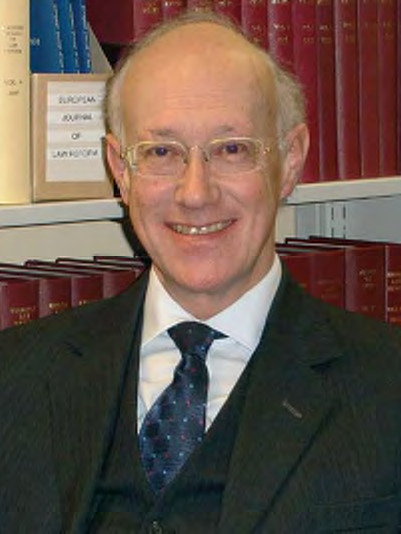

Senator of the College of Justice
- In office 2001–2020
- Nominated by: Henry McLeish; As First Minister
- Monarch: Elizabeth II

Personal details
- Born: James Edward Drummond Young; 17 February 1950 (age 76) Edinburgh
- Education: Sidney Sussex College, Cambridge; Harvard, Edinburgh
- Profession: Advocate

James Edward Drummond Young, Lord Drummond Young, PC (born 17 February 1950) is a retired judge of the Supreme Courts of Scotland and was formerly Chairman of the Scottish Law Commission.

== Early life ==
James Drummond Young was born in Edinburgh, the son of Duncan Drummond Young (1914–2007) and his wife, Annette Mackay (1914–1995).

He was educated at John Watson's School in the city. He studied law at Sidney Sussex College, Cambridge (BA 1971), Harvard University (Joseph Hodges Choate Memorial Fellow, 1971–72; LLM 1972) and the University of Edinburgh School of Law (LLB 1974), and was admitted to the Faculty of Advocates in 1976, taking silk in 1988.

He served as Standing Junior Counsel to the Department of Industry from 1984 to 1986 and to the Inland Revenue from 1986 to 1988, and as an Advocate Depute from 1999 to 2001. He is co-author with John St. Clair of The Law of Corporate Insolvency in Scotland, first published in 1988 and revised in 1992 and 2004.

== Judicial career ==
Drummond Young was appointed a Senator of the College of Justice, a judge of the Court of Session and High Court of Justiciary, Scotland's supreme courts, in July 2001, taking the judicial title, Lord Drummond Young. He formerly sat in the Outer House, and was appointed to the Inner House in June 2013. On 1 January 2007, Lord Drummond Young succeeded Lord Eassie for a five-year term as chairman of the Scottish Law Commission, an advisory board to the Scottish Government which reviews, and recommends reform of, the Law of Scotland. Lord Drummond Young demitted office in December 2011, but continued as acting chairman until Lady Clark of Calton was appointed chairman in June 2012. He retired in March 2020.

== Personal life ==
Lord Drummond Young married Elizabeth Mary Campbell-Kease in 1991, with whom he has a daughter, Anna, who has appeared on University Challenge. His interests include music and travel, and he is a member of The Speculative Society of Edinburgh.
