= John Rattray (surgeon) =

Surgeon and golfer (1707–1771)

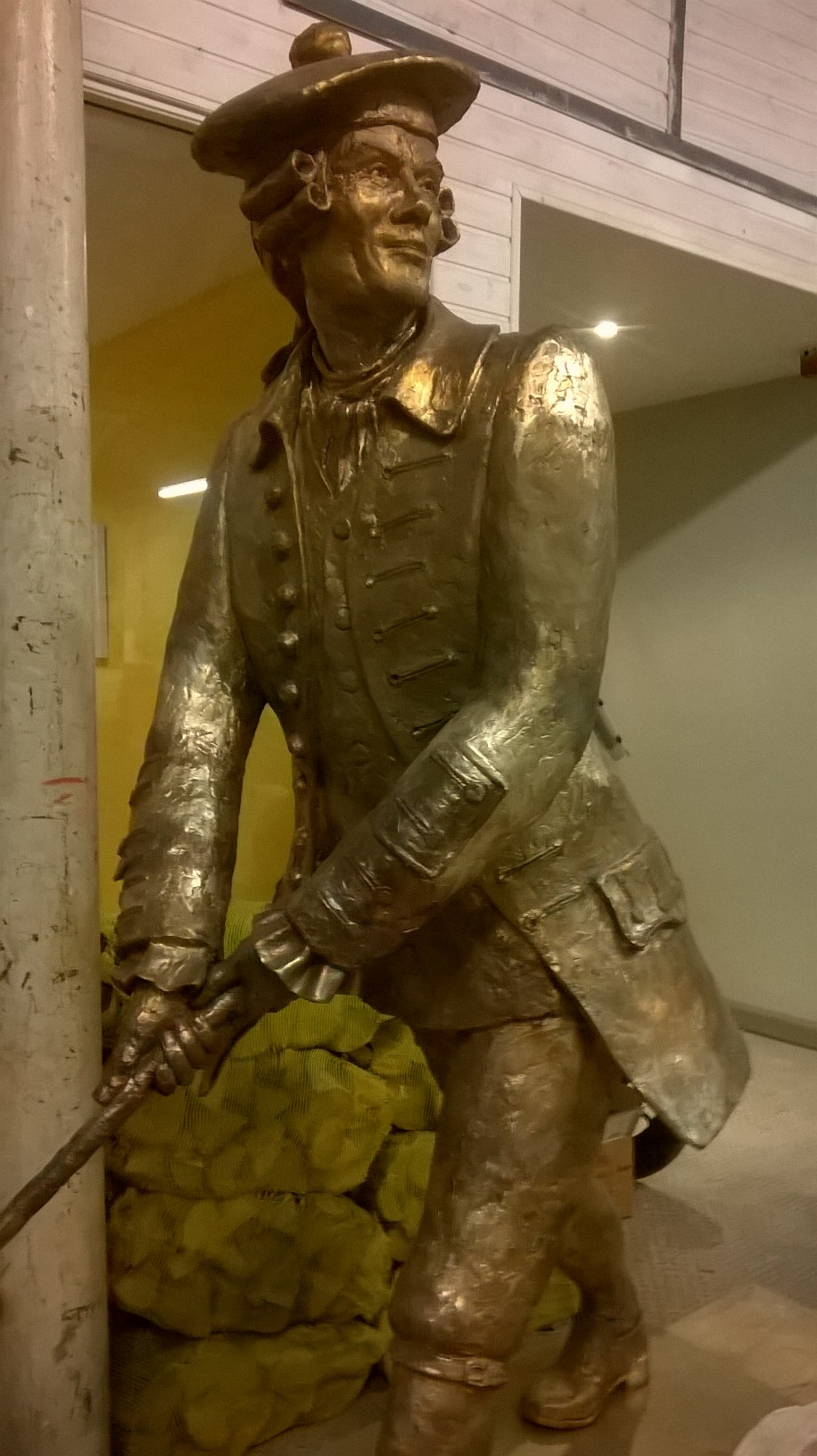
- Bronze life-sized figure of John Rattray
- Born: 22 September 1707; Craighall Castle, Rattray, Perthshire, Scotland
- Died: 5 July 1771 (aged 63); Edinburgh, Scotland
- Occupation: Surgeon
- Known for: Signing the first rules of golf. Surgeon to Prince Charles Edward Stuart

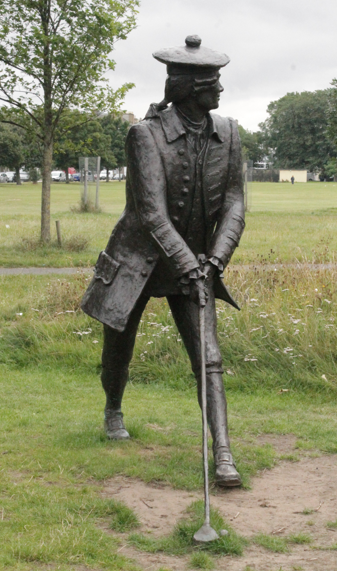
Statue of John Rattray on Leith Links

John Rattray (22 September 1707 – 5 July 1771) was an Edinburgh surgeon who served as surgeon to Prince Charles Edward Stuart during the Jacobite rising of 1745. He was a proficient archer, winning the Edinburgh Arrow on two occasions, however it is for his golfing achievements that he is principally remembered. A skilful golfer, Rattray won the first competition organised by the Company of Gentleman Golfers (later the Honourable Company of Edinburgh Golfers) to become the 'Captain of Goff' for a year. In this capacity he signed the first ever Rules of Golf.

== Early life ==
John Rattray was born on 22 September 1707 in Craighall Castle, the family seat of Clan Rattray, near the village of Blairgowrie and Rattray in Perthshire, Scotland. His father the Rt Rev Thomas Rattray (1684–1743) was an Episcopalian priest who became the Bishop of Dunkeld, then of Brechin and was elected Primus of the Scottish Episcopal Church. On his death in 1743 his elder son James became clan chief and inherited the estate. As the second son John Rattray had no such inheritance and he trained as a surgeon in Edinburgh by apprenticeship to the surgeon John Semple between 1728 and 1735, when he began surgical practice in Edinburgh. To enhance his professional status he applied to become a freeman (or fellow) of the Incorporation of Surgeons of Edinburgh (later the Royal College of Surgeons of Edinburgh). This involved sitting a series of four examinations which were held in the later months of 1740, and, having passed these, he was admitted a freeman of the Incorporation in November 1740.

== Sporting activities ==
Rattray joined the Royal Company of Archers in 1731 and won the archery competition for the silver punch bowl on 4 occasions (1732, 1735, 1740, and 1742). The company's most prestigious prize, the Edinburgh Arrow or Silver Arrow was presented to the company by Edinburgh Town Council in 1709 as a prize for an annual archery competition. Rattray won this twice, in 1735 and 1744. He was also a skilled golfer and his prowess at golf is recorded in this extract from the mock heroic poem 'The Goff' by Rev. Thomas Mathison (1720–1760) published in 1743, the first poem devoted to the sport of golf.

North from Edina eight furlongs and more
Lies that fam’d field, on Fortha’s sounding shore,
Here Caledonian chiefs for health resort,
Confirm their sinews by the manly sport....
Rattray for skill, and Crosse for strength renowned,
Stuart and Leslie beat the sandy ground....
Yea here great Forbes, patron of the just,
The dread of villains and the good man’s trust
When spent with toils in serving human kind,
His body recreates and unbends his mind.

The ‘fam’d field’ referred to is Leith Links, an area of links grassland in the burgh of Leith where the self-styled 'Company of Gentleman Golfers' began to golf regularly. The 'great Forbes' mentioned is Duncan Forbes of Culloden (1685–1747), Lord President of the Court of Session, Scotland's most senior law officer and one of Rattray's regular golfing companions. Their friendship was to save Rattray's life.

== The first rules of golf ==
The Gentleman Golfers had approached the Edinburgh Town Council asking them to donate a silver club to be played for in an annual golf competition over Leith Links, in much the same way as the Council provided the silver arrow for archery competitions. The Town Council approved this request on 7 March 1744 and published the 'Regulations' for the competition. These were to do with the administration of the competition indicating that the draw should be made from a bonnet, that it should be open to any golfer from Great Britain & Ireland and that clerks should mark down each stroke. In their document the Council note that the golfers have already drawn up the 'Articles and Laws in playing at golf', and these, the original rules of golf, were used for this competition. The competition was played over five holes at Leith Links: Sawmill (414 yards (379 m)), North-mid (461 yards (422 m)), East (426 yards (390 m)), South-mid (495 yards (453 m)) and Thorntree (435 yards (398 m)). It is likely that they played three rounds of this course. On 2 April 1744 Rattray won the first competition held over this course, winning the silver club and earning the title ‘Captain of the Goff’. It is Rattray's signature that appears below the 13 original rules of golf recorded in the minute book of the Honourable Company of Edinburgh Golfers. It is not clear whether he signed this in his capacity as captain of the golf or as the author of the rules. As was customary for entries in the minutes, he has written 'Cptn' after his signature, which some commentators have interpreted as indicating that he simply signed the minute as captain, the rules having been a joint effort of the golfers, who included some of the best legal brains in Scotland. The rules signed by Rattray lay undisturbed in the minute book of the Honourable Company for some 200 years until discovered there by the golf historian CB Clapcott in 1937. The rules are now in the collection of the National Library of Scotland. The St Andrews golfers, adopted them with minor modifications in 1754 and they still form the basis of many of the modern laws of the game. These original rules of golf comprised 12 general rules and one local rule applicable to the Leith course.

== Role in the 1745 Jacobite rising ==
On 19 August 1745 Prince Charles Edward Stuart raised his standard at Glenfinnan marking the start of his attempt to claim the British throne for his father James Stuart ('The Old Pretender'). To gather support he asked clans and families, likely to be sympathetic, to join his cause. As prominent Episcopalians the Rattrays were likely supporters, but James Rattray, by then the clan chief, opted to donate £50 rather than join the standard. John Rattray joined the Jacobite army just after their victory at the Battle of Prestonpans on 21 September, when the call went out to Edinburgh surgeons to care for the wounded. Amongst those who responded to the call were Alexander Monro (a staunch Hanoverian) and Alexander ("Lang Sandy") Wood. Rattray rode the five miles from his house at South Foulis Close near the foot of Edinburgh's High Street with his colleague George Lauder, Deacon (president) of the Incorporation of Surgeons. Lauder later claimed that they had treated some 300 wounded and accommodated many of these at their own expense, but as this claim was made as part of a plea for his life, it may well have been exaggerated. Rattray stayed with the Jacobite army as it advanced into England then retreated from Derby, eventually becoming Surgeon-general and personal surgeon to Prince Charles. After the battle of Culloden, Rattray surrendered to the Hanoverians and was imprisoned in Inverness, but he and Lauder were not allowed to treat the wounded among their fellow prisoners.

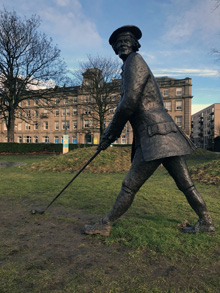
Statue of John Rattray by David Annand on Leith Links

Robert Forbes, bishop of Ross and Caithness, in his detailed contemporary account of events of the '45 rising The Lyon in Mourning describes how Rattray was taunted by a Hanoverian officer "We know well what you are sir, the Pretender’s surgeon. If anyone hangs you shall." Rattray's golfing companion Duncan Forbes, Lord Culloden a staunch Hanoverian, made a personal plea of intercession on behalf of Rattray to the Duke of Cumberland, which was successful, as was a subsequent plea for Lauder. They were freed but Cumberland ordered that they be rearrested in Edinburgh and they were held in London until January 1747 when they were finally released having signed an oath of obedience to the King.

== Later life ==
Rattray returned to surgical practice in Edinburgh and to golf. In 1751 he again won the golf competition for the silver club and continued to practice as a surgeon until at least 1766. He died in Edinburgh on 5 July 1771 and was buried on 10 July in Lady Gray’s Ground in Greyfriars Kirkyard, Edinburgh.

== Statue on Leith Links ==
In 2013 the Leith Rules Golf Society obtained planning permission to erect a life size statue of John Rattray on Leith Links and commissioned the sculptor David Annand for the project. The bronze statue with three accompanying stones and plaques were unveiled on 11 September 2019. The statue is situated within a landscaped setting on the north side of the original Golf Course on Leith Links, to celebrate Rattray's contribution to golf.
