= Rankin–Cohen bracket =

In mathematics, the Rankin–Cohen bracket of two modular forms is another modular form, generalizing the product of two modular forms. Rankin (1956, 1957) gave some general conditions for polynomials in derivatives of modular forms to be modular forms, and Cohen (1975) found the explicit examples of such polynomials that give Rankin–Cohen brackets. They were named by Zagier (1994), who introduced Rankin–Cohen algebras as an abstract setting for Rankin–Cohen brackets.

== Definition ==
If $f(\tau)$ and $g(\tau)$ are modular forms of weight k and h respectively then their nth Rankin–Cohen bracket [f,g]_{n} is given by

$$[f,g]_n = \frac{1}{(2\pi i)^n}\sum_{r+s=n} (-1)^r\binom{k+n-1}{s}\binom{h+n-1}{r} \frac{\mathrm{d}^r f}{\mathrm{d}\tau^r}\frac{\mathrm{d}^s g}{\mathrm{d}\tau^s} \ .$$

It is a modular form of weight k + h + 2n. Note that the factor of $(2\pi i)^n$ is included so that the q-expansion coefficients of $[f, g]_n$ are rational if those of $f$ and $g$ are. $\mathrm d^rf/\mathrm d\tau^r$ and $\mathrm d^s g/\mathrm d\tau^s$ are the standard derivatives, as opposed to the derivative with respect to the square of the nome which is sometimes also used.

== Representation theory ==
The mysterious formula for the Rankin–Cohen bracket can be explained in terms of representation theory. Modular forms can be regarded as lowest weight vectors for discrete series representations of SL_{2}(R) in a space of functions on SL_{2}(R)/SL_{2}(Z). The tensor product of two lowest weight representations corresponding to modular forms f and g splits as a direct sum of lowest weight representations indexed by non-negative integers n, and a short calculation shows that the corresponding lowest weight vectors are the Rankin–Cohen brackets [f,g]_{n}.

== Rings of modular forms ==
The first Rankin–Cohen bracket is the Lie bracket when considering a ring of modular forms as a Lie algebra.

== See also ==
- Maass–Shimura operator
