= James Dunsmure =

Scottish surgeon (1814–1886)

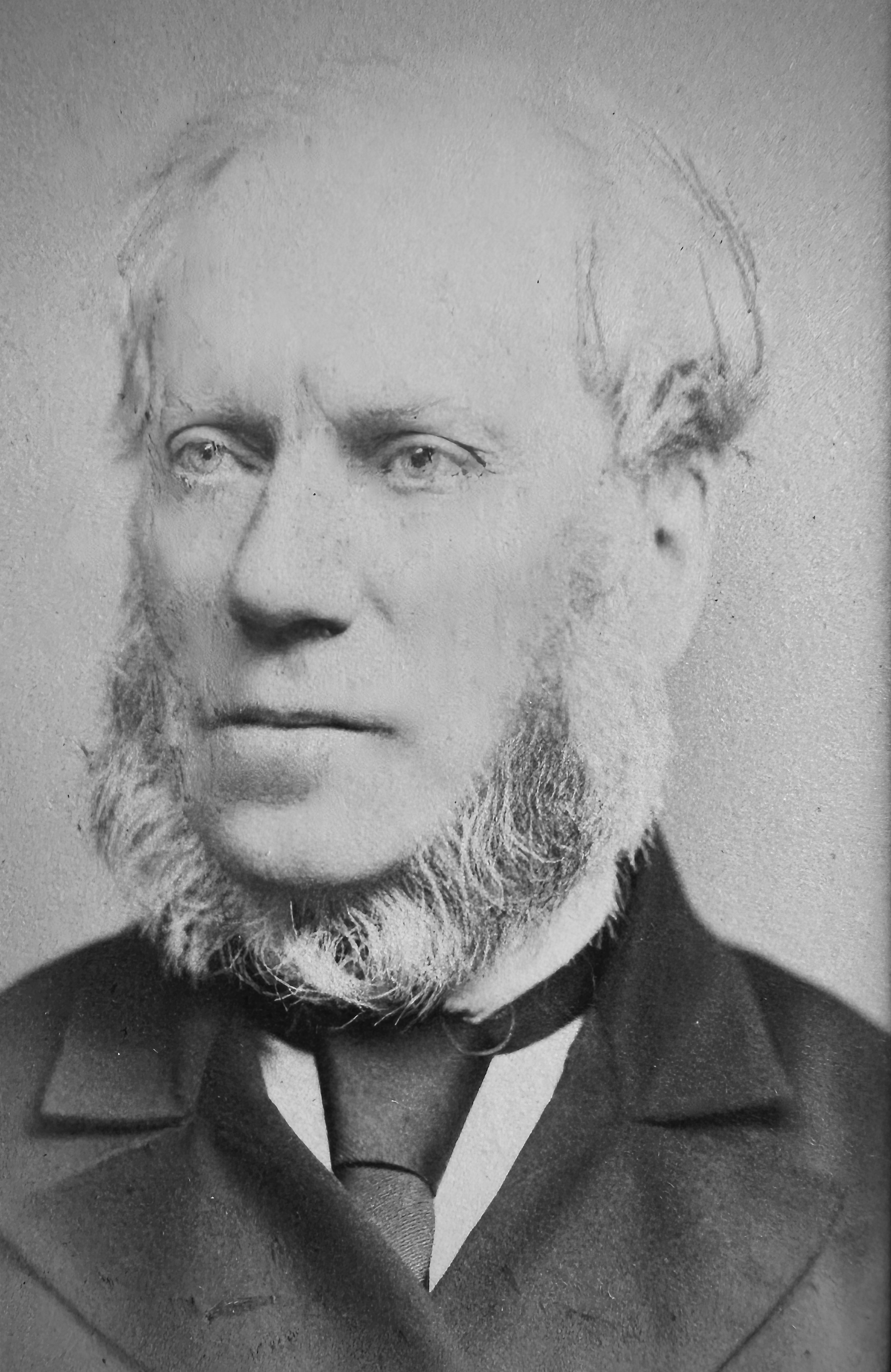

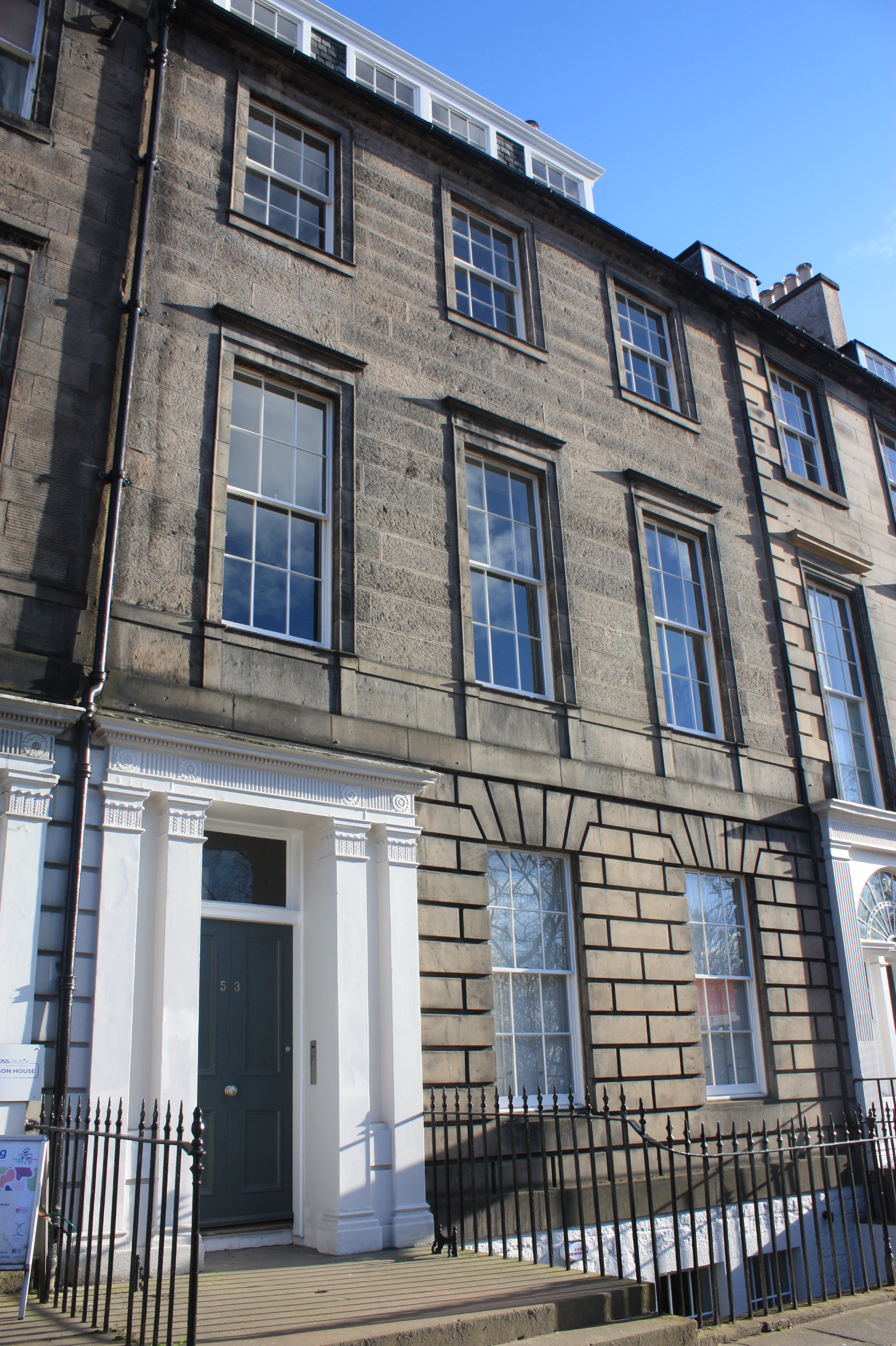
53 Queen Street, Edinburgh

James Dunsmure FRSE FRCSEd (23 April 1814 – 15 October 1886) was a Scottish surgeon. He served as President of the Royal College of Surgeons of Edinburgh.

== Life ==
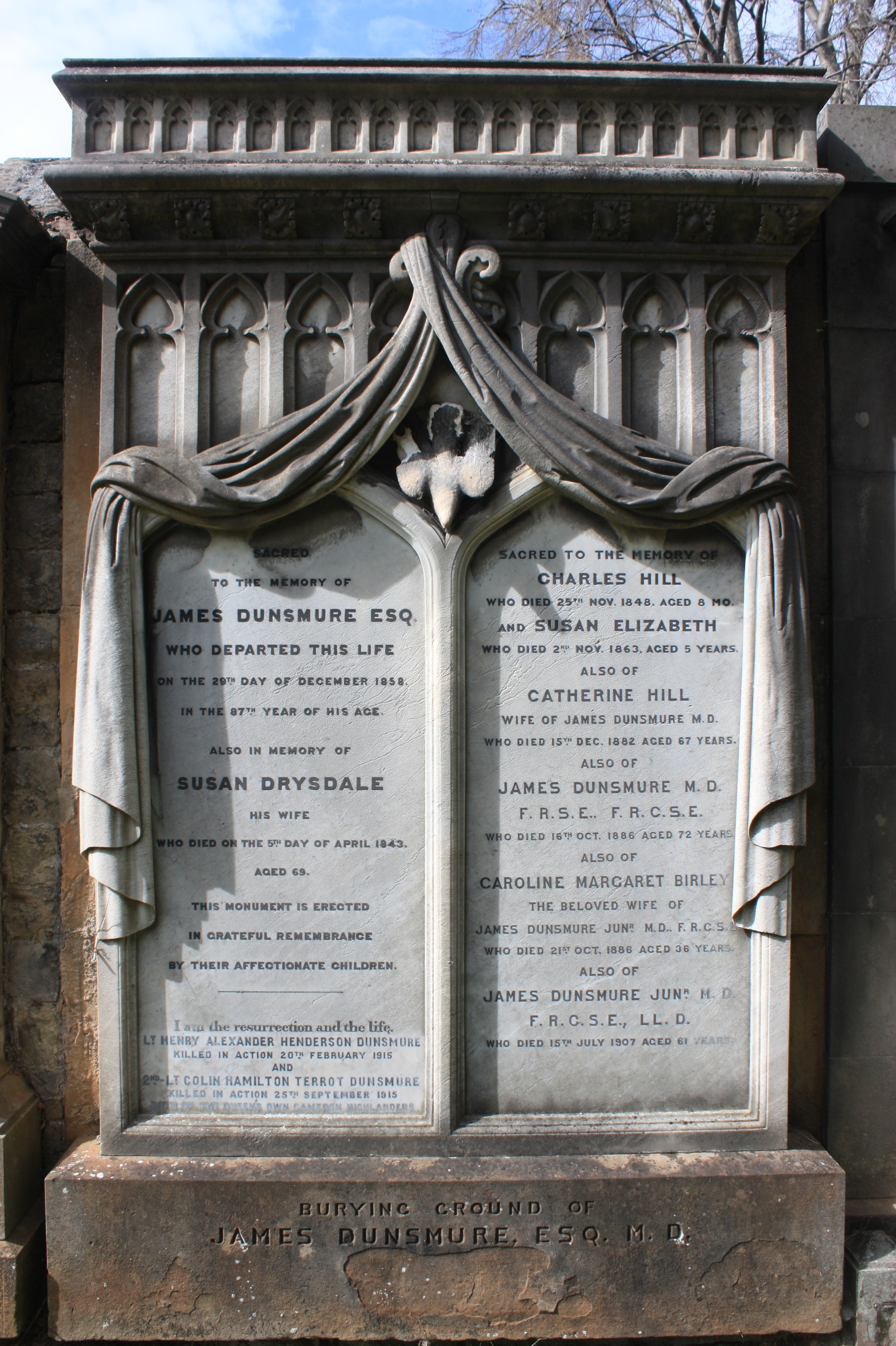
The grave of James Dunsmure, Dean Cemetery, Edinburgh

He was born at 33 George Street in Edinburgh on 23 April 1814, the son of Susan Drysdale and her husband, James Dunsmure (1771–1858), Secretary to the Fisheries Board for Scotland. He was educated at the High School in Edinburgh then the University of Edinburgh receiving his doctorate (MD) in 1835.

He worked as a house surgeon under John Lizars before taking up a senior position at the Edinburgh Royal Infirmary. He was both examiner and assessor to the Royal College of Surgeons of Edinburgh and the University of Edinburgh, and house surgeon to John Watson's Hospital and the North British Railway Company. He was a lecturer in surgery at the Edinburgh Extramural School of Medicine at Surgeons' Hall.

In 1842 Dunsmure was elected a member of the Harveian Society of Edinburgh and served as president in 1869. In 1857 he was elected a member of the Aesculapian Club. In 1866 he was elected a Fellow of the Royal Society of Edinburgh, his proposer being John Hutton Balfour. He was a member of the Royal Company of Archers, winning the Queen's prize for accuracy on three occasions and the Edinburgh Arrow as the finest archer in 1860. He was also a church elder in the Church of Scotland from 1847 to 1886. From 1865 to 1867 he was President of the Royal College of Surgeons of Edinburgh, replacing Benjamin Bell (Joseph Bell's father).

He died at home, 53 Queen Street (previously the home of John Mortland of Rindmuir) in Edinburgh’s New Town on 15 October 1886. He was buried with his family in Dean Cemetery in western Edinburgh. The white marble monument lies against the north wall of the original cemetery.

== Family ==
He was married to Catherine Hill (1815–1882). Their son James Dunsmure Jr FRCSE LLD (1846–1907) was an obstetrician who also served as President of the Royal College of Surgeons of Edinburgh. Their son Robert Dunsmure immigrated to Australia, where he was a pastoralist and member of the Queensland Legislative Assembly. Another son was George Hill Dunsmure (1856–1924).

== Neighbours ==
In his Queen Street home he was a neighbour to Sir James Young Simpson and Francis Brodie Imlach.
