= John Watson's Institution =

Former: John Watson's Institution Current: Modern One
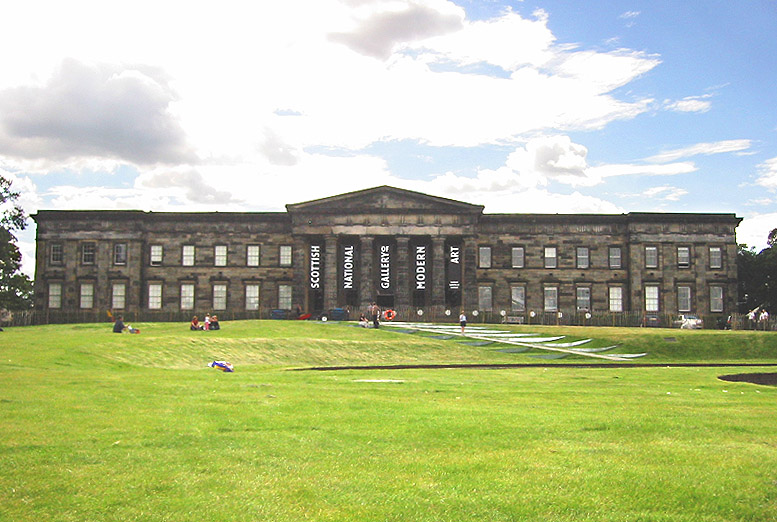
- John Watson's Institution, now home of Modern One of the Scottish National Gallery of Modern Art. (photo: August 2002)

Location
- 75 Belford Road; Edinburgh, Scotland
- Coordinates: 55°57′03.09″N 3°13′39.23″W

Information
- Motto: Stabimus (Latin) (we shall stand)
- Established: 1762
- Closed: 1975

The John Watson's Institution was a school established in Edinburgh, Scotland in 1762. The building was designed in the Greek Revival style in 1825 by architect William Burn, FRSE (1789–1870). Following the closure of the school in 1975, the building was left vacated for a number of years before becoming home to Modern One of the Scottish National Gallery of Modern Art.

== History ==
In 1762 John Watson, an Edinburgh solicitor and Writer to the Signet, left the residue of his estate for charitable purposes for children in the Edinburgh area. (Note: John Watson, who died November 5, 1762, was a son of David Watson, Writer in Edinburgh. In November 1741, he married Isabel, daughter of David Mudie, Merchant in Montrose.) In 1975 the school was closed and in 1984 the organisation was changed by Parliament to the John Watson's Trust in order to distribute funds from the sale of its assets.

The school magazine was known as The Levite.

== Headmasters ==
=== John Forbes, ll.d., d.d. (1840–) ===
John Forbes (1802–1899) became Headmaster, and Governor of John Watson's Institution around 1840. He was a son of Patrick Forbes (1776–1847), a minister in the Church of Scotland from 1829 to 1830 and a Professor of Humanities and Chemistry at the University of Aberdeen.

=== John Langhorne (1897–1925) ===
John Langhorne was born at Tonbridge, Kent, in 1862. He was educated at Westminster School and Trinity College, Cambridge. His first appointments were Queen Elizabeth's school, Dedham and Christ's College, Finchley. He moved to Edinburgh in 1890 and for seven years was master at Loretto School, which had been founded by a distant relative, Thomas Langhorne. John Langhorne died whilst on a visit to Barnard Castle on 27 August 1925 and is buried there. He had been a member of the Association for Teachers in Secondary Schools (Scotland). After his death a bronze tablet was installed in his memory at the school. He was the son of the Reverend John Langhorne and died without issue.

== Alumni ==
- Marion Stevenson, missionary to Africa, and opponent of female genital mutilation.
- James Drummond Young, Lord Drummond Young, judge of the Supreme Courts of Scotland and Chairman of the Scottish Law Commission.
- Oliver Shaw Rankin, Scottish scholar and theologian.
- Charlie Aitken, Aston Villa footballer

== People ==
- James Dunsmure (1846–1907), served as Physician to the Institution in the late 19th Century.

== Gallery ==
John Watson's Institution
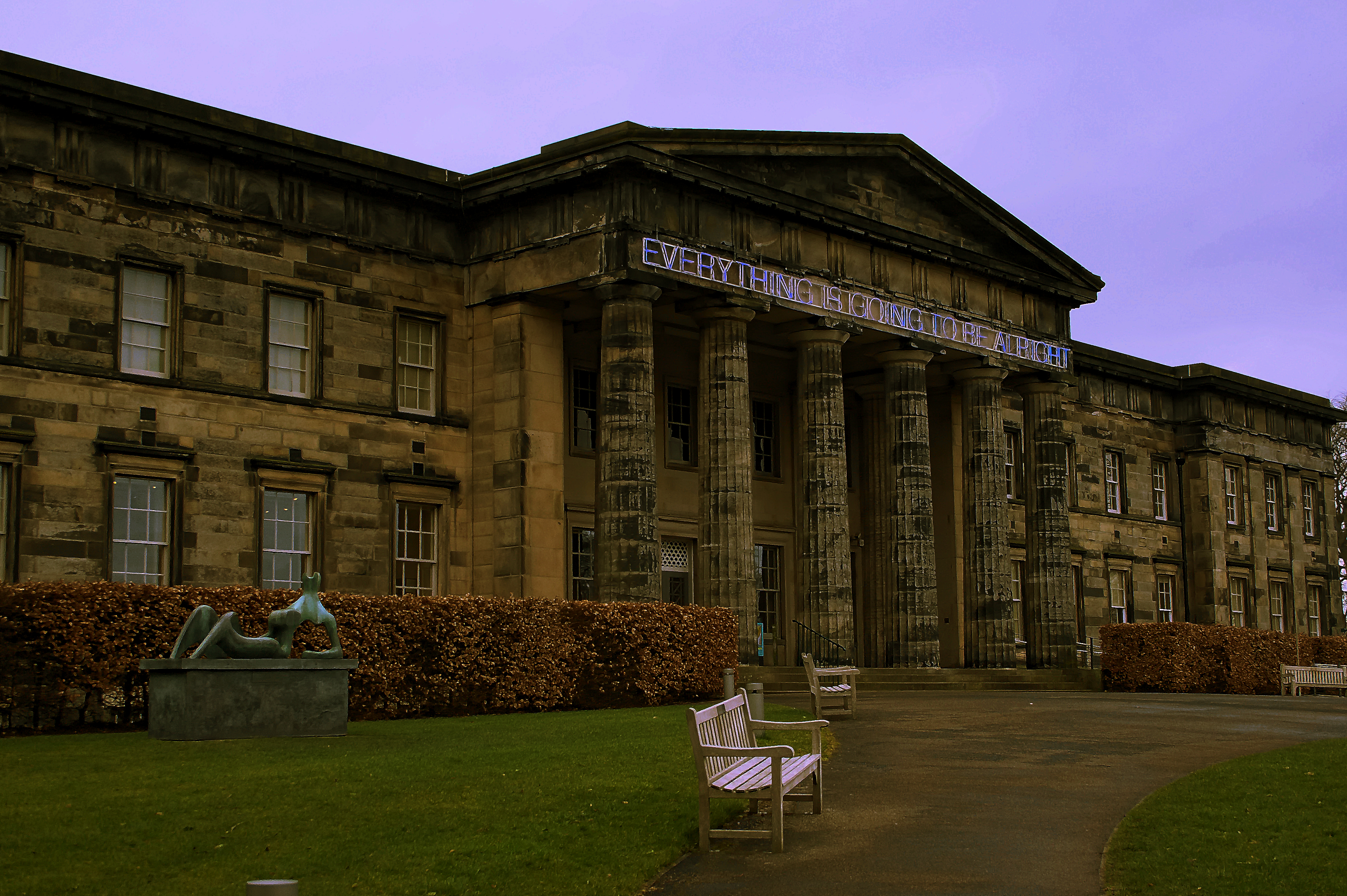
Modern One, Scottish National Gallery of Modern Art, Belford Road, Edinburgh (form main building of John Watson's Institution).
(14 March 2015)

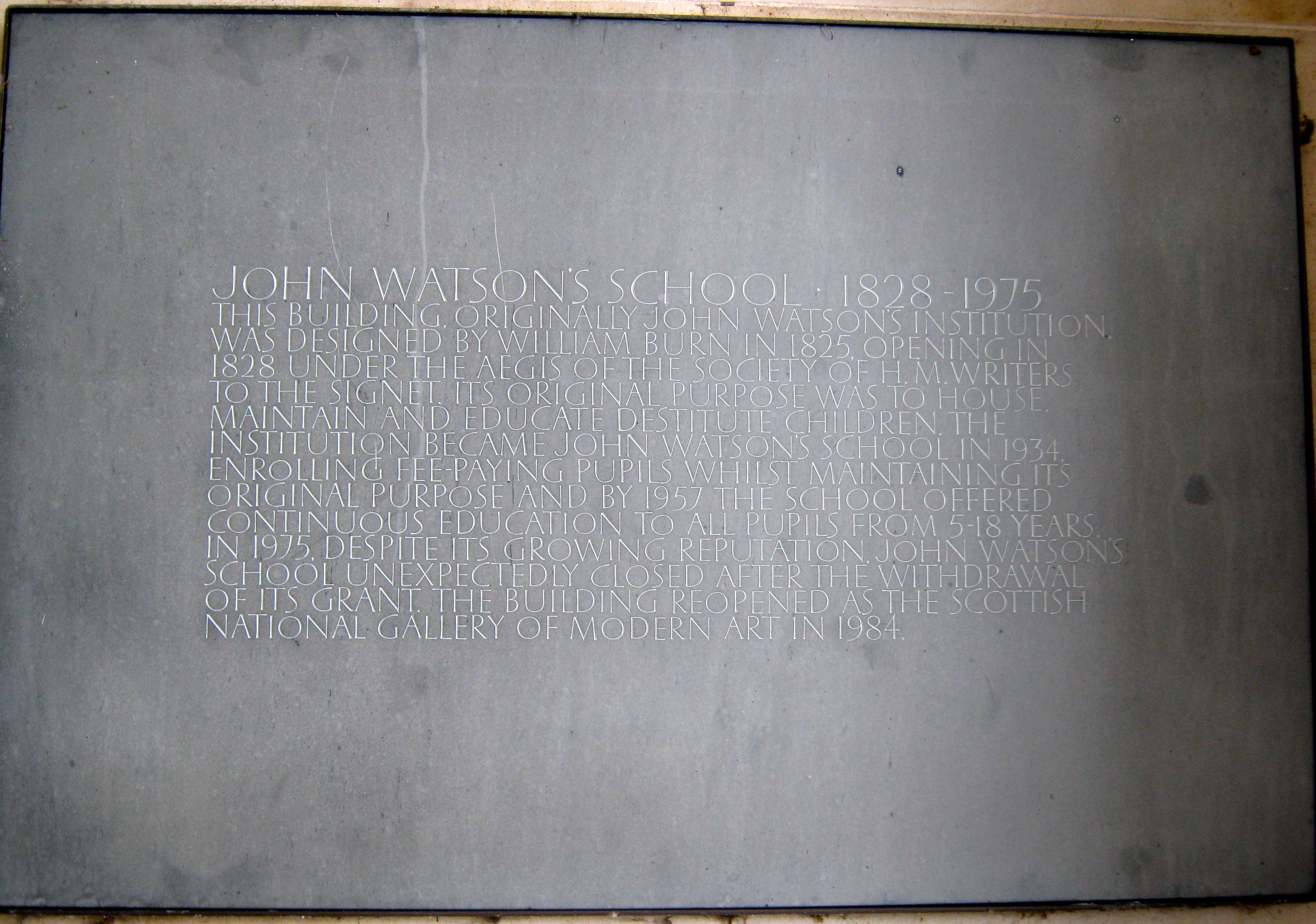
John Watson's School, 1828–1975:
This building, originally John Watson’s Institution, was designed by William Burn in 1825, opening in 1828 under the aegis of the Society of H.M. Writers to the Signet. Its original purpose was to house, maintain and educate destitute children. The institution became John Watson’s School in 1934, enrolling fee-paying pupils whilst maintaining its original purpose, and by 1957 the school offered continuous education to all pupils from 5-18 years. In 1975, despite its growing reputation, John Watson’s School unexpectedly closed after the withdrawal of its grant. The building reopened as the Scottish National Gallery of Modern Art in 1984.
(photo: 2 January 2014)

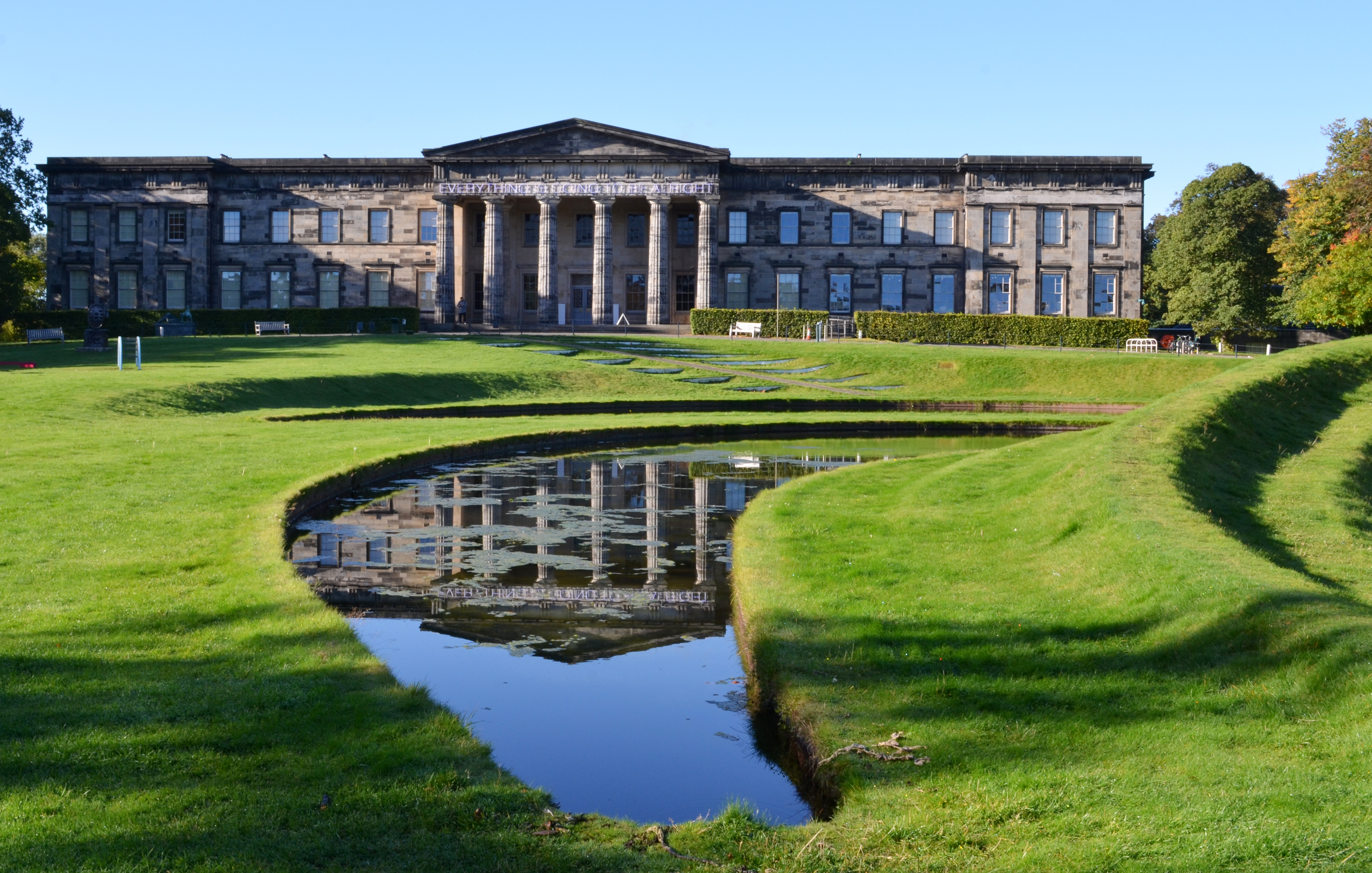
Modern One
(28 September 2018).

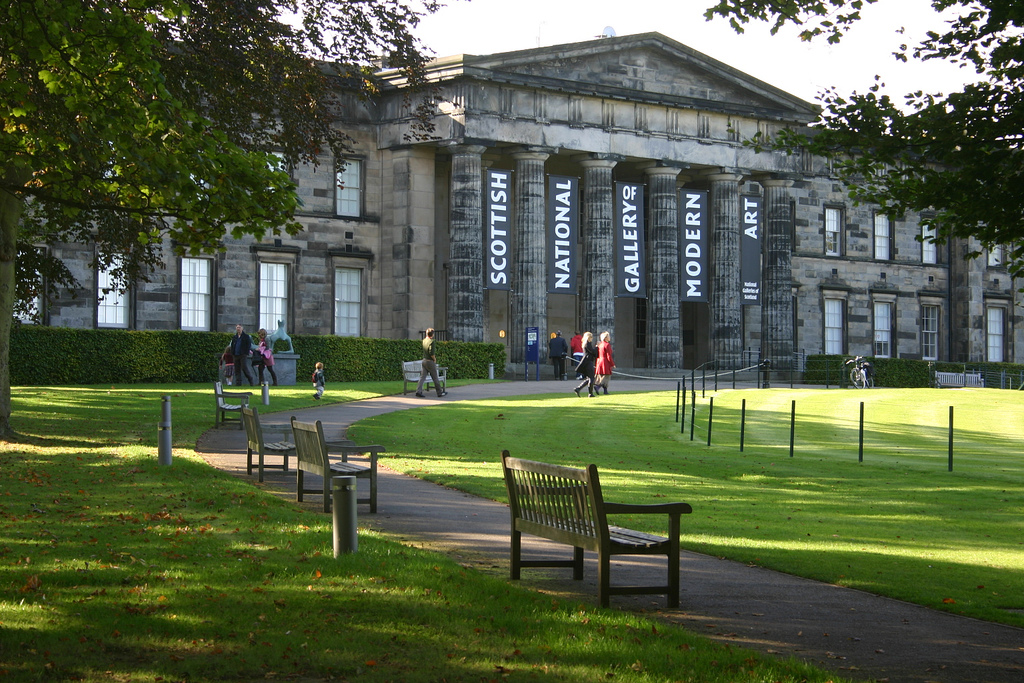
Modern One
(7 October 2007).

== Bibliography ==
=== References ===
- Blue Slate Plaque. "John Watson's School". Blue Plaque V3 Register. Blue Slate Plaque. Location: 75 Belford Road, Edinburgh. Blue Plaque ID No. 30376.
- Ferguson, Richard Saul (1837–1900), ed. (1897). Transactions of the Cumberland and Westmorland Antiquarian & Archæological Society. Part 2. Vol. 14. Cumberland and Westmorland Antiquarian and Archaeological Society; T. Wilson, Highgate, Kendal (printer). p. 478. Retrieved March 16, 2025. ISSN 0309-7986; OCLC 863410443 (all editions).
1. Via Internet Archive (Getty).
- The Levite. The Magazine of the John Watson Club. Edinburgh: John Watson's Institution (Edinburgh). 1808–1914. OCLC 877756987.
1. "The Langhorne Memorial". Vol. 4, no. 7. Spring 1927.
- "The John Watson's Trust".
- Schaff, Philip (1819–1893); Herzog, Johann Jakob (1805–1882); Jackson, Samuel Macauley (1851–1912); Schaff, David Schley (1852–1941), eds. (1897). "Forbes, John, LL.D." Encyclopedia of Living Divines and Christian Workers of All Denominations in Europe and America Being a Supplement to Schaff-Herzog Encyclopedia of Religious Knowledge. New York: Funk & Wagnalls. p. 71. Retrieved March 16, 2025. OCLC 745765873 (all editions).
1. Via Internet Archive (Cornell).
- Wallis, Isobel C. (1918–2010) (1982). John Watson's School: A History. Retrieved March 16, 2025. ISBN 978-0-9508-4390-2, 0-9508-4390-3; OCLC 1310749469 (all editions).
1. Via Internet Archive (Cornell).
Note: Wallis was Deputy Headmistress and Housemistress of John Watson's School from 1955 to 1975.
- "The John Watson's Trust Scheme Order 1984" (PDF).
