= John Phin =

American non-fiction writer

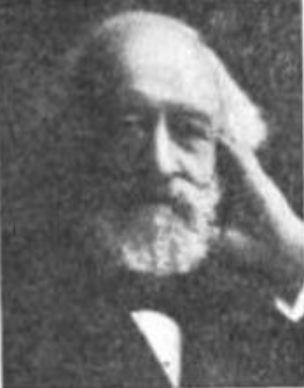
- Born: September 9, 1832; Edinburgh, Scotland
- Died: December 29, 1913 (aged 81); Paterson, New Jersey
- Occupation(s): Lawyer, writer, publisher

John Phin (September 9, 1832 (Note: Some resources list his birth year as 1830) – December 29, 1913) was a prolific author and publisher, a teacher of applied science and a Shakespeare scholar.

== Life ==
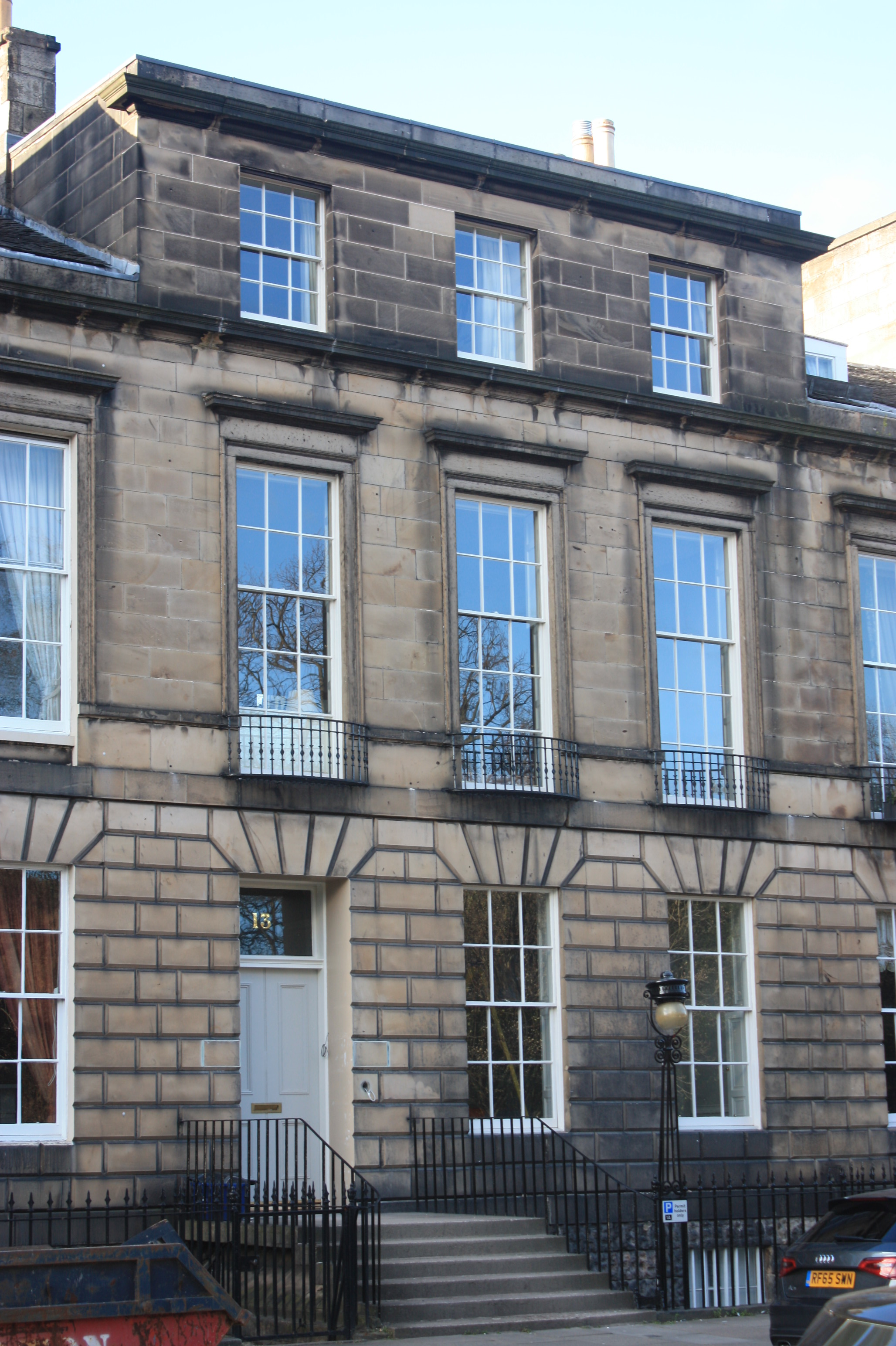
13 Heriot Row, Edinburgh

He was born at 4 Bank Street in Edinburgh's Old Town the son of Charles Phin WS a lawyer and Session Clerk in the Edinburgh Law Courts. He appears to have remained in Edinburgh so presumably studied law at Edinburgh University.

In 1856 he won the Edinburgh Arrow award, therefore must have been a member of the Royal Company of Archers.

In 1861 he was a successful lawyer in the Scottish Supreme Court, living at 13 Heriot Row in the New Town in Edinburgh.

His best-known book today is The evolution of the atmosphere as a proof of design and purpose in the creation, and of the existence of a personal God. The book was openly theistic; Phin's Intelligent Designer was the Creator God of Genesis: "...it must be equally obvious that if we find strong and unmistakable evidence of intelligent and controlling design in the earliest stages of the development of this planet, that evidence applies with equal force to the existence of a designer, or in other words, to the existence of a personal God."

Professor Phin (he taught at People's College in New York and the University of Pennsylvania) organized and ran the "Industrial Publishing Company" in New York City for 25 years; he was a member of the New York Press Club. Some of his many publications are listed in the Bibliography (below). He was also the editor of the American Journal of Microscopy.

== Bibliography ==
- The evolution of the atmosphere as a proof of design and purpose in the creation, and of the existence of a personal God; A simple and rigorously scientific reply to modern materialistic atheism (1908)
- Shakespearean Encyclopedia
- Shakespearean Notes and New Readings
- The Shakespeare Cyclopædia and New Glossary (with Dr. Edward Dowden) (1902)
- Seven Follies of Science (1906)
- Natural History of Hell - A Discussion of the Relations of Christianity to Modern Science
- Lightning Rods, and How to Construct Them
- The Chemical History of the Six Days of Creation (1870)
- Hints for Beginners with the Microscope
- Practical Hints on the Selection and Use of the Microscope (Second Edition 1878)
- Practical Hints on the Selection and Use of the Microscope (Fourth Edition 1881)
- Dictionary of Practical Agriculture
- Open air grape culture: a practical treatise on the garden and vineyard culture of the vine, and the manufacture of domestic wine. Designed for the use of amateurs and others in the northern and middle states (1862)
- The workshop companion: A collection of useful and reliable recipes, rules, processes, methods, wrinkles, and practical hints for the household and the shop (1887)
- How to use the microscope: Being practical hints on the selection and use of that instrument, intended for beginners (1890)
- Common Sense Currency. A Practical Treatise on Money in Its Relations to National Wealth and Prosperity. Intended for the Use of the Common People (1894)
- Trade "Secrets" and Private Recipes (1887)
- How to become a Good Mechanic (1883)
- Plain directions for the construction and erection of Lightning-rods (1879)
