= Chazy equation =

In mathematics, the Chazy equation is the differential equation

$$\frac{d^3y}{dx^3} = 2y\frac{d^2y}{dx^2} - 3 \left(\frac{dy}{dx}\right)^2.$$

It was introduced by Jean Chazy (1909, 1911) as an example of a third-order differential equation with a movable singularity that is a natural boundary for its solutions.

One solution is given by the Eisenstein series

$$E_2(\tau) =1-24\sum \sigma_1(n)q^n= 1-24q-72q^2-\cdots.$$

Acting on this solution by the group SL_{2} gives a 3-parameter family of solutions.
