= Maass–Shimura operator =

In number theory, specifically the study of modular forms, a Maass–Shimura operator is an operator which maps modular forms to almost holomorphic modular forms.

== Definition ==
The Maass–Shimura operator on (almost holomorphic) modular forms of weight $k$ is defined by
$$\delta_kf(z):=\frac{1}{2\pi i}\left(\frac{k}{2iy}+\frac{\partial}{\partial z}\right)f(z)$$
where $y$ is the imaginary part of $z$.

One may similarly define Maass–Shimura operators of higher orders, where
$$\begin{aligned}\delta_k^{(n)}&:=\delta_{k+2n-2}\delta_{k+2n-4}\cdots\delta_{k+2}\delta_k\\&=\frac{1}{(2\pi i)^n}\left(\frac{k+2n-2}{2iy}+\frac{\partial}{\partial z}\right)\left(\frac{k+2n-4}{2iy}+\frac{\partial}{\partial z}\right)\cdots\left(\frac{k+2}{2iy}+\frac{\partial}{\partial z}\right)\left(\frac{k}{2iy}+\frac{\partial}{\partial z}\right),\end{aligned}$$
and $\delta_k^{(0)}$ is taken to be identity.

== Properties ==
Maass–Shimura operators raise the weight of a function's modularity by 2. If $f$ is modular of weight $k$ with respect to a congruence subgroup $\varGamma\subseteq\mathrm{SL}_2(\Z)$, then $\delta_kf$ is modular with weight $k+2$:
$$(\delta_kf)(\gamma z)=(\delta_kf(z))(cz+d)^{k+2}\quad\text{for any }\gamma=\begin{pmatrix}a&b\\c&d\end{pmatrix}\in\varGamma.$$
However, $\delta_kf$ is not a modular form due to the introduction of a non-holomorphic part.

Maass–Shimura operators follow a product rule: for almost holomorphic modular forms $f$ and $g$ with respective weights $k$ and $\ell$ (from which it is seen that $fg$ is modular with weight $k+\ell$), one has
$$\delta_{k+\ell}(fg)=(\delta_kf)g+f(\delta_\ell g).$$

Using induction, it is seen that the iterated Maass–Shimura operator satisfies the identity
$$\delta_k^{(n)}=\sum_{r=0}^n(-1)^{n-r}\binom{n}{r}\frac{(k+r)_{n-r}}{(4\pi y)^{n-r}}\frac{1}{(2\pi i)^r}\frac{\partial^r}{\partial z^r}$$
where $(a)_m=\Gamma(a+m)/\Gamma(a)$ is a Pochhammer symbol for a rising factorial.

Lanphier showed a relation between the Maass–Shimura and Rankin–Cohen bracket operators:
$$(\delta_k^{(n)}f(z))g(z)=\sum_{j=0}^n\frac{(-1)^j\binom{n}{j}\binom{k+n-1}{n-j}}{\binom{k+\ell+2j-2}{j}\binom{k+\ell+n+j-1}{n-j}}\delta_{k+\ell+2j}^{(n-j)}([f,g]_j(z))$$
where $f$ is a modular form of weight $k$ and $g$ is a modular form of weight $\ell$. Additionally, Lanphier showed that the Rankin–Cohen bracket definition can be written in terms of Maass–Shimura operators as
$$[f,g]_n=\sum_{r+s=n}(-1)^r\binom{k+n-1}{s}\binom{\ell+n-1}{r}(\delta_k^{(r)}f)(\delta_\ell^{(s)}g).$$
