= Cadman (surname) =

Cadman is a surname. Notable people with the surname include:

- Alan Cadman (born 1937), Australian politician
- Alfred Cadman (1847–1905), New Zealand politician
- Bill Cadman (born 1960), American politician from Colorado
- Charles Wakefield Cadman (1881–1946), American composer
- Christine Cadman (fl.1908), British archer
- Chuck Cadman (1948–2005), Canadian politician
- Colin Cadman (1916–1971), Scottish botanist
- David Cadman, Vancouver city councillor
- Deborah Cadman (born 1963), British politician
- Dona Cadman (born 1950), Canadian politician
- Dorothy A. Cadman (fl. 1908–1927), English painter
- Elijah Cadman (1843–1927), English evangelist
- John Cadman (disambiguation), multiple people
- Radclyffe Cadman (1924–2011), South African politician
- Robert Cadman (1711–1739), British steeplejack and tightrope walker
- Royce Cadman (born 1987), English rugby union player
- S. Parkes Cadman (1864–1936), American clergyman, newspaper writer
- Samuel Cadman (1877–1952), English cricketer
- Stacey Cadman (born 1979), British actress and television presenter
- William Cadman (1883–1948), English missionary
- William Cadman (priest) (1815–1891), English evangelist and clergyman
