= John Oswald =

John Oswald is the name of:

- John Oswald (revolutionary) (c. 1760–1793), Scottish philosopher, poet, journalist, and revolutionary
- John Oswald (bishop) (died 1780), Anglican bishop in Ireland
- John Oswald (British Army officer) (1771–1840), British general
- John Oswald (composer) (born 1953), Canadian composer associated with the Plunderphonics project
- John Oswald (footballer) (1869–1953), Scottish association footballer
- John Oswald (politician) (born 1939), Australian politician
- John Clyde Oswald (1872–1938), American author and magazine editor
- John H. Oswald (1830–1899), Scottish landscape and genre artist
- John W. Oswald (1917–1995), American university president
- Jani Lane (John Kennedy Oswald, 1964–2011), American musician with glam metal band Warrant
- John Holt Oswald, Clerk of the United States House of Representatives from 1799 to 1801.
