= William Ritchie (moderator) =

Scottish minister

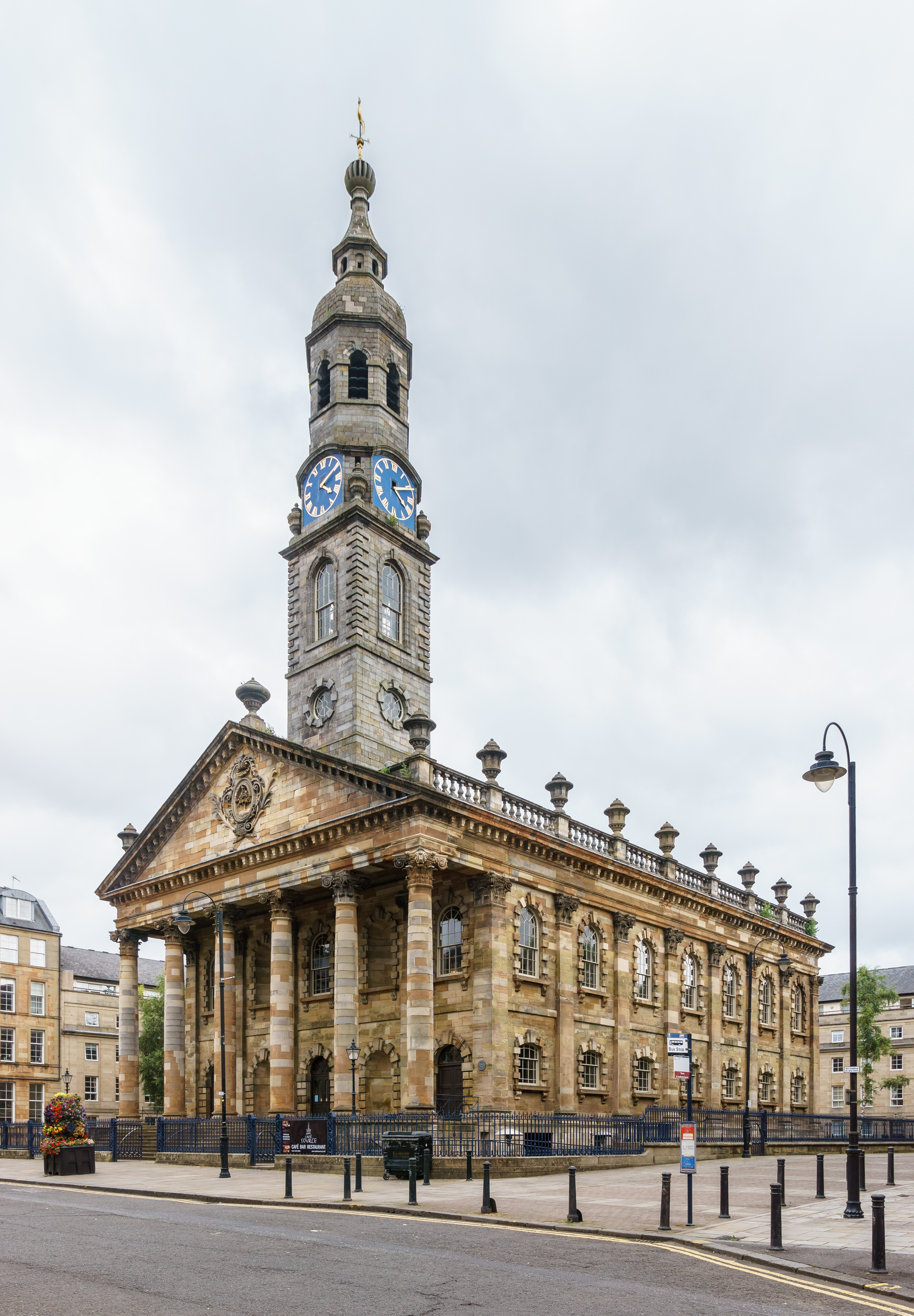
St Andrews in Glasgow

William Ritchie FRSE (1747 – 29 January 1830) was a Scottish minister who rose to be Moderator of the General Assembly of the Church of Scotland in 1801.

== Life ==
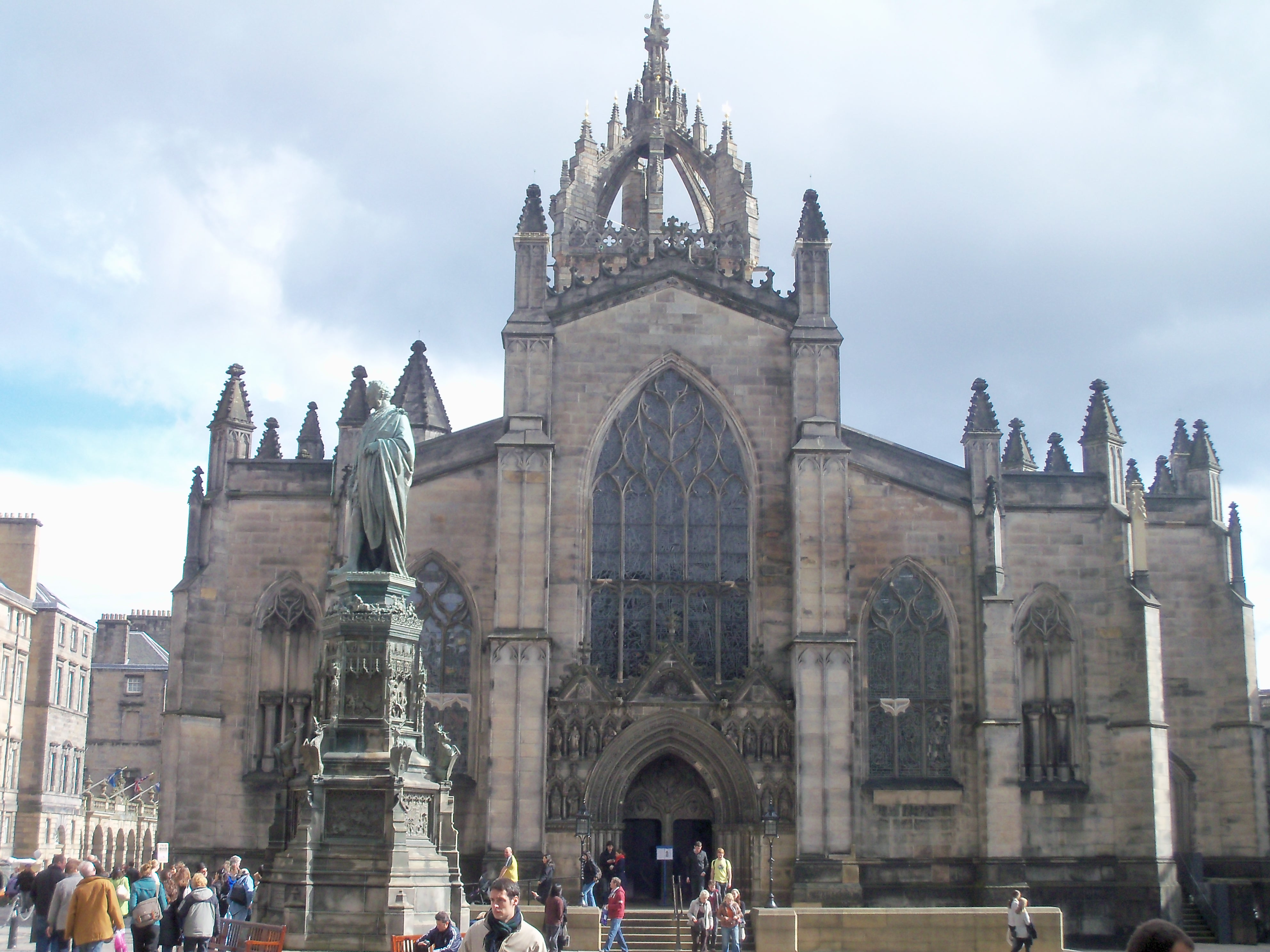
St Giles Cathedral

He was born late in December 1747 the son of John Ritchie of Fowlis Wester. He was baptised on 3 January 1748. He was educated at the local parish school. He became a schoolteacher at Newtyle in 1763 and schoolteacher at Fowlis Wester in 1766. He then studied at the University of St Andrews. He was licensed to preach by the presbytery of Fordoun in 1774. Unable to find a position he became tutor to the family of Lord Inverurie and travelled with him of on a tour of Europe until 1779. Returning to Scotland he declined positions at both Trinity Gask and Dundee. In 1789 he went on a second Grand Tour, this time with the sons of Oswald of Auchencruive.

In 1794 he was ordained as minister of Tarbolton and translated to Kilwinning in 1798. In 1798 the University of Glasgow awarded him an honorary doctorate (DD). In 1801 he succeeded Very Rev George Husband Baird as Moderator of the General Assembly.

In 1802 he was translated to be minister of St Andrew's in the Square in central Glasgow. At this time he lived on Miller Street in Glasgow.

In 1808 he translated to St Giles Cathedral in Edinburgh and in 1809 he additionally took on the role of Professor of Divinity at the University of Edinburgh. He lived nearby at 5 Argyll Square (now demolished). He also preached at St Giles Cathedral.

In 1810 he was elected a fellow of the Royal Society of Edinburgh. His proposers were Alexander Christison, Rev Andrew Brown, and Archibald Alison.

He retired in 1828 and died unmarried at Tarbolton on 29 January 1830.

== Artistic recognition ==
His portrait of 1827 by John Sheriff is held by the Scottish National Portrait Gallery.
