= Cadman =

Cadman may refer to:

== People ==
- Cadman (surname)
- Baron Cadman, Peerage of the United Kingdom, created 1937

== Places ==
- Cadman Glacier, located in Graham Coast, Antarctica
- Cadman Plaza, located in Brooklyn, New York
- Cadman's Cottage, oldest surviving residential building in Sydney

=== Streets ===
- Cadman Road, Bridlington
- Cadman Road, Intake, Sheffield
- Cadman Street, Mosborough, Sheffield
