= Robert Macfarlane Cameron =

Scottish architect (1860–1920)

Robert Macfarlane Cameron RIBA DL (1860–1920) was a 19th/20th century Scottish architect, specialising first in public houses and later in cinemas.

== Life ==
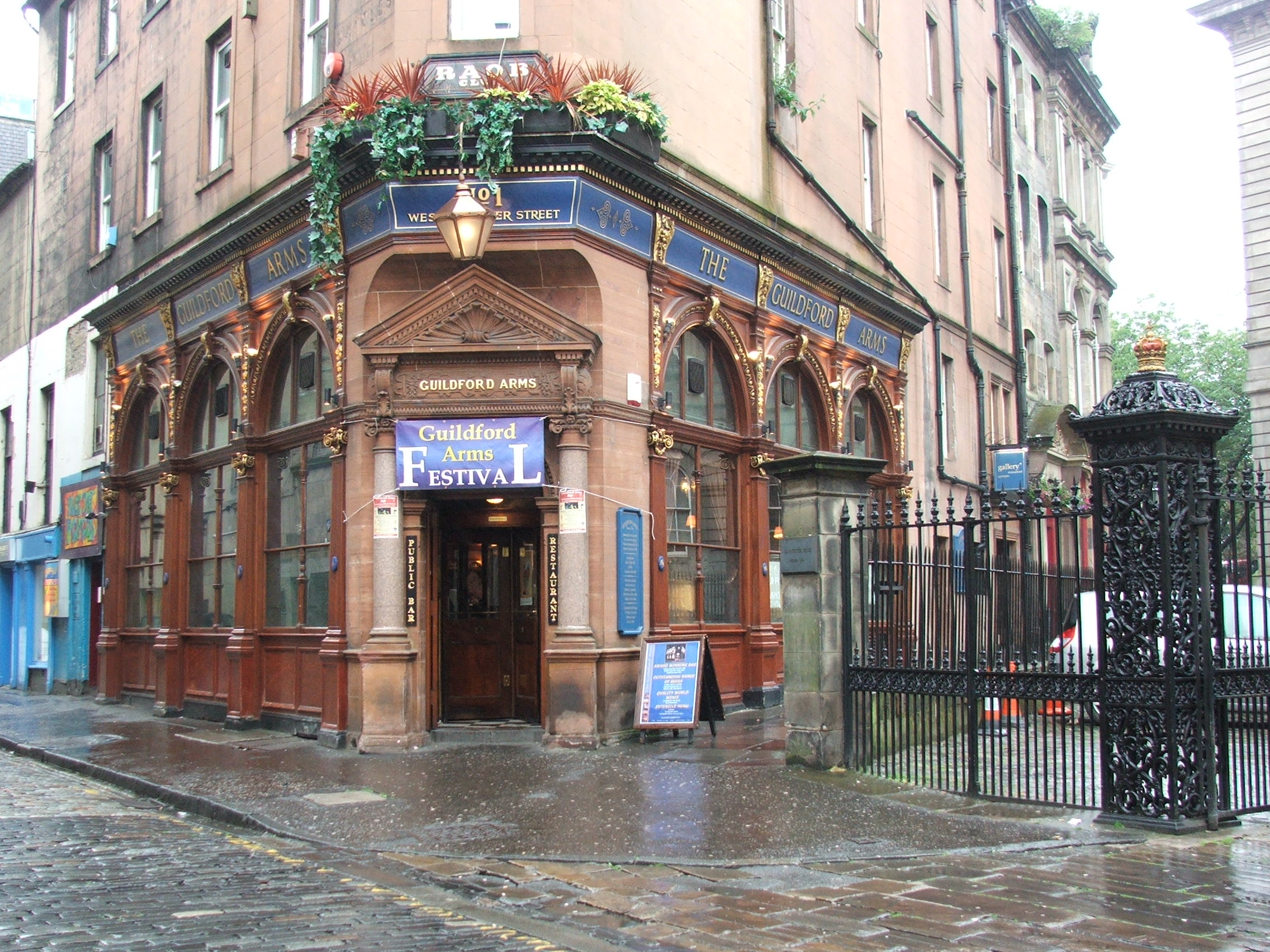
Guildford Arms, Edinburgh

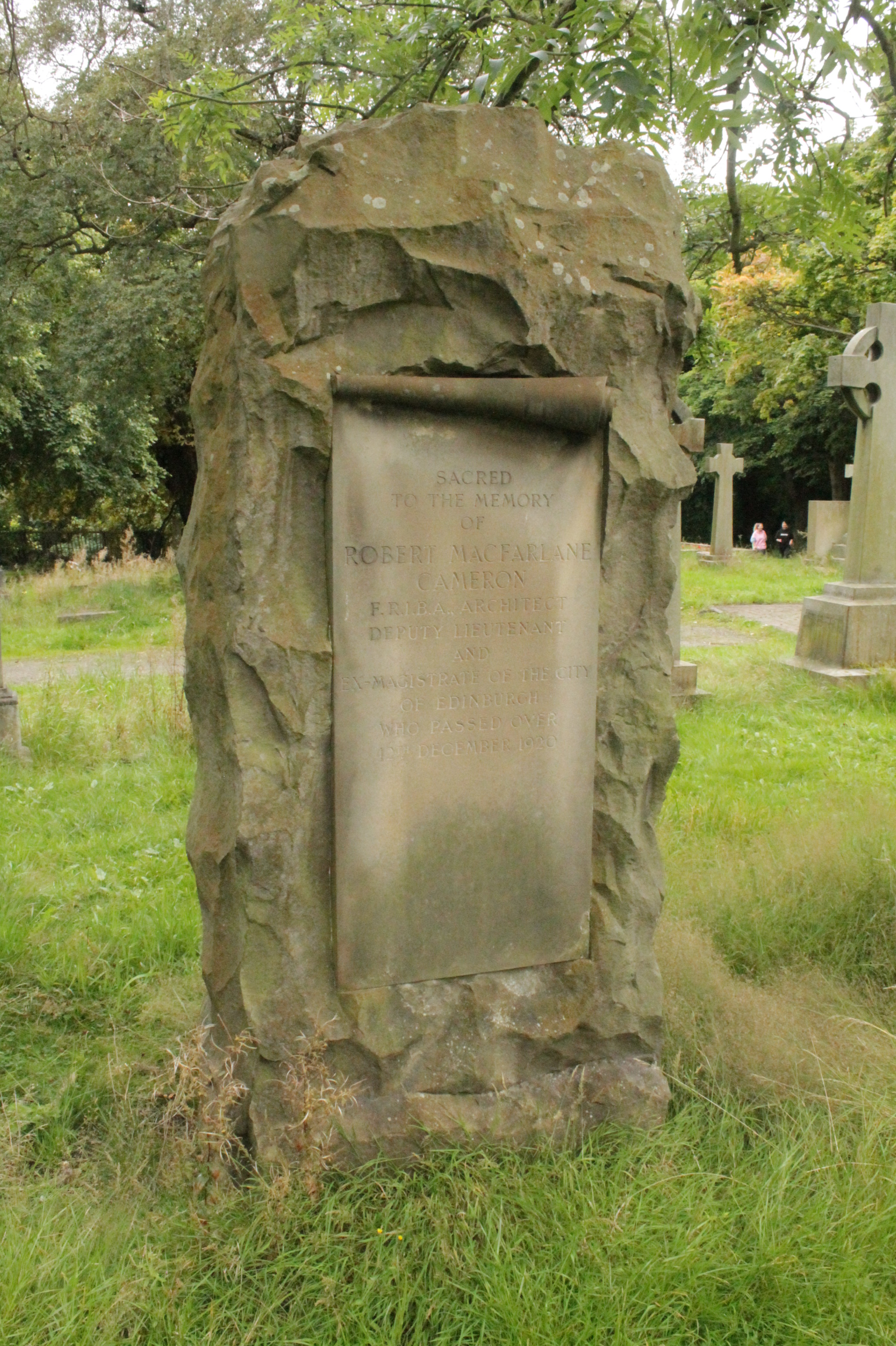
The grave of Robert Macfarlane Cameron, Warriston Cemetery

He was born on 23 July 1860 at 93 South Back of Canongate (now known as Holyrood Road) the son of Robert Cameron. He was educated at George Watson's College then was apprenticed as an architect to David Bryce at 131 George Street from 1875. He stayed with Bryce until 1881 then moved to the offices of Robert Matheson, who was then the Clerk of Works for all Scotland. In 1882 he began assisting on the Prison Board for Scotland.

A recession in the Scottish building industry caused him to work as a furniture designer in Kirkcaldy for 2 or 3 years, but in 1885 he then bravely opened his own architectural practice in Edinburgh, based at 20 George Street. In 1890 he moved to larger premises at 24 George Street then in 1910 downsized and simply worked from home.

He lived his final years at 53 Great King Street, a magnificent Georgian townhouse in Edinburgh's Second New Town. Over and above his architect skills, he served the city of Edinburgh as a Bailie and Magistrate, eventually becoming Deputy Lieutenant of Edinburgh.

He died on 12 December 1920 and is buried in Warriston Cemetery. The grave lies close to the main north south entrance path, on its east side.

His architectural practice was taken over by Stewart Kaye.

== Works ==
see

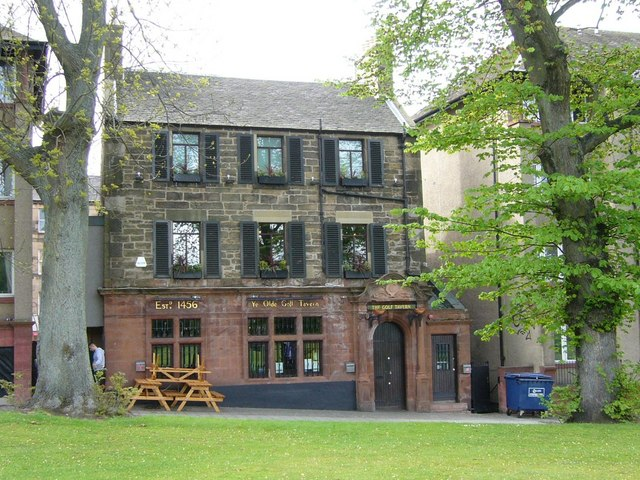
Golf Tavern, Edinburgh

- Tenemental blocks at 2 to 24 Viewforth in southwest Edinburgh (1885)
- Dunbar Public School (1886)
- Lasswade Public School (1886)
- Lipton's shop, 56/57 Princes Street (1887)
- Brickman warehouse, 3 Charlotte Place in Leith (1887)
- The Donald Fountain, Dunfermline (1888)
- Pair of villas at 52/54 Inverleith Place in Edinburgh (1890)
- Loanhead School (1891)
- Warrender Park Free Church, Edinburgh (1891)
- Kirkcaldy Public School (1893)
- Dunnikier Primary School (1894)
- Guildford Arms pub, Rose Street, Edinburgh (1895)
- Juniper Green Church (1895)
- Tenement at 14/16 Holyrood Road, Edinburgh (1895)
- Royal Burgess Golf Course and Clubhouse, Barnton, Edinburgh (1897)
- Offices and Whisky bond for Pattison & Co, Breadalbane Street, Leith (1898)
- Offices for J M Scott, Leith (1898)
- Abbeyhill United Presbyterian Church (1899)
- Golf Tavern, Bruntsfield Links, Edinburgh (1899)
- The Three Tuns pub, Hanover Street, Edinburgh (1899)
- Gorgie United Presbyterian Church and Hall (1900)
- Pub on corner of Howard Place and Warriston Crescent, Edinburgh (1903)
- Haymarket Inn, Edinburgh (1906)
- Remodelling of Forth Bridge Hotel, South Queensferry (1907)
- Edinburgh Dental Hospital, Chambers Street (1908) later remodelled
- Dunbar Parish Church Halls (1909)
- Roller skating rink, Dundee (1909) - possibly the first in Britain
- Cattle Markets, Chesser, Edinburgh (1910)
- Grandstand at Powderhall Greyhound Stadium (1910)
- Picture House cinema, Royal Mile (1910)
- Princes Cinema, Princes Street Edinburgh (1912)
- Royal Hotel and Cinema (1912)
- St Cuthberts Poorhouse, Craigleith, Edinburgh (1912)
- Palace Cinema, Edinburgh

== Family ==
In 1916, aged 56, he married a widow, Margaret Emma Bowman (née Burns).
