= John Sheriff =

Scottish artist of the 19th century

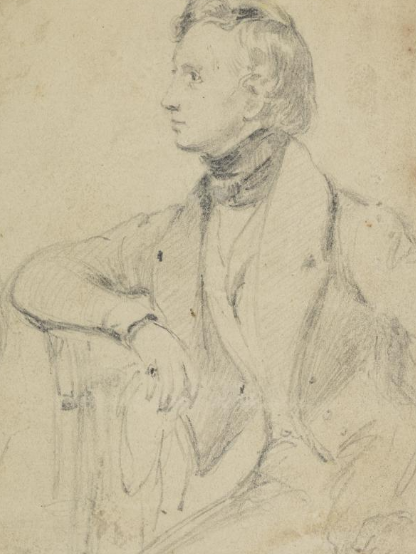
Sketch of John Sheriff by Sir Daniel Macnee

John Sheriff ARSA (1816–1844) was a 19th century Scottish artist, specialising in animals.

== Life ==
He was born in Mearnskirk south of Glasgow in 1816.

He went to Glasgow as an apprentice copper-plate printer in 1830, working for James Lumsden & Son, wholesale stationers at 20 Queen Street.

Around 1832, James Lumsden employed Horatio McCulloch to paint murals in his hallway at St Georges Place and Sheriff was asked to assist McCulloch. During this task, they became friends and Sheriff determined to be an artist. He moved to Edinburgh and quickly joined the circle of Edinburgh artists, being made an associate of the Royal Scottish Academy (one of their youngest members ever).

He was living at 44 Howe Street in 1839, and by 1842 had a studio at 26 Frederick Street in Edinburgh's First New Town, just off Princes Street.

He showed much success but died in Edinburgh on 9 December 1844 aged 28, and is buried in Warriston Cemetery just east of the lower side of the central vaults. He was one of the first burials in the cemetery, which had only opened in the previous year. His older brother William Sheriff (1814-1893) is buried with him.

He was portrayed twice by Sir Daniel Macnee President of the Royal Scottish Academy: in a pencil sketch of around 1842; and an earlier oil painting showing John looking very young.
