= William Henry Lowe =

Scottish physician and amateur botanist

Dr William Henry Lowe FRSE PRCPE (1815–1900) was a Scottish physician and amateur botanist. He served as president of the Royal College of Physicians of Edinburgh 1873 to 1875. He was president of the Royal Medical Society and the Botanical Society of London.

== Life ==
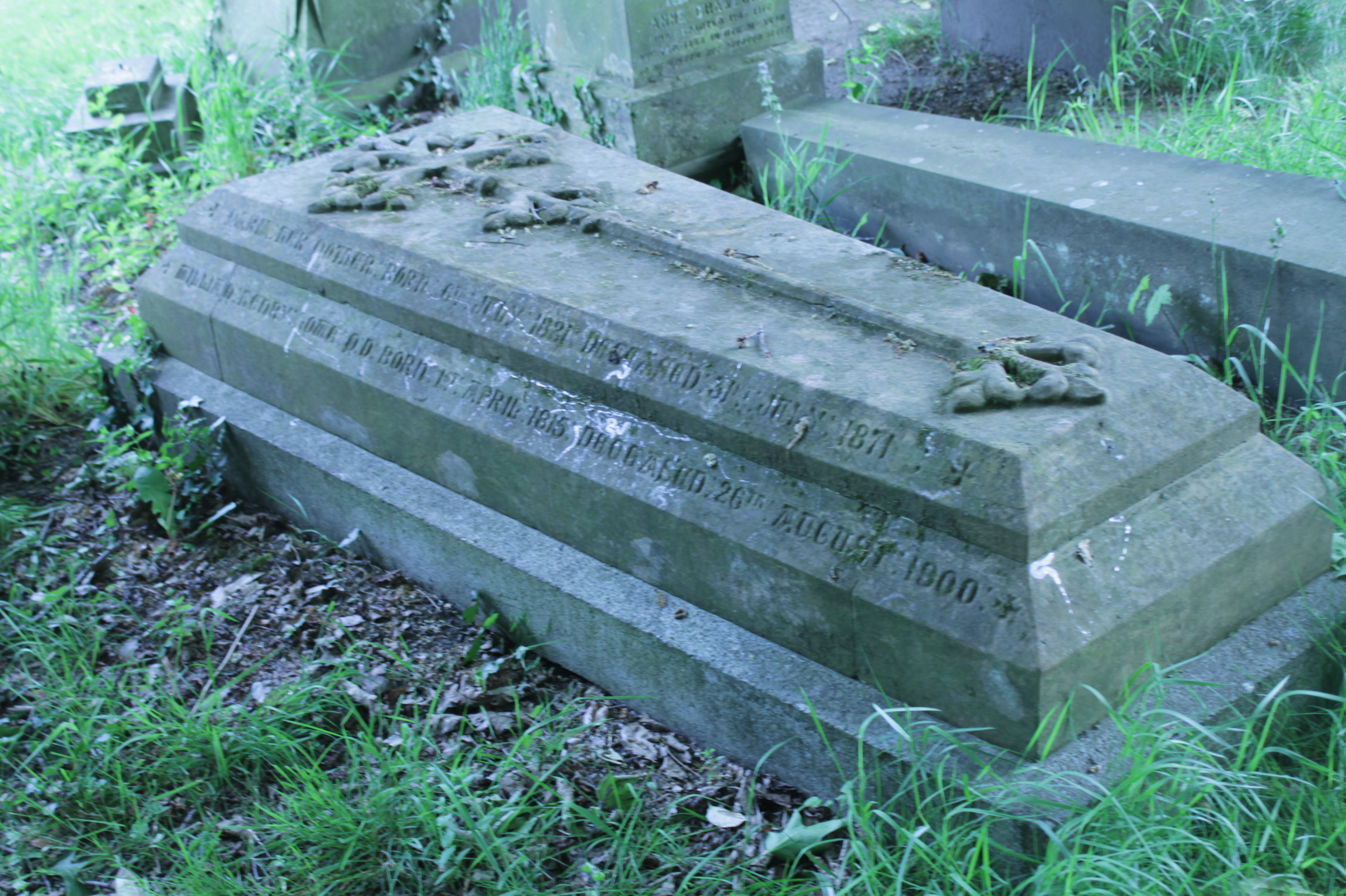
The grave of William Henry Lowe MD in Warriston Cemetery

William Henry Lowe was born on 1 April 1815.

He studied medicine at the University of Edinburgh gaining his doctorate in 1840. He then became Resident Physician at the Saughtonhall Institute for the Insane in western Edinburgh. He later set up as a GP in the Balgreen district of Edinburgh.

He was elected a Fellow of the Royal Society of Edinburgh in 1849, his proposer being Thomas Anderson. In 1851 he was elected a member of the Harveian Society of Edinburgh. In 1860 he was elected a member of the Aesculapian Club.

He retired to Wimbledon in 1875 and died at home, Woodcote in Wimbledon Park, London on 26 August 1900.

He is buried with his wife in Warriston Cemetery in Edinburgh. The grave lies in the central area just north of the vaults.
