= John Smart (landscape artist) =

Scottish landscape painter (1838–1899)

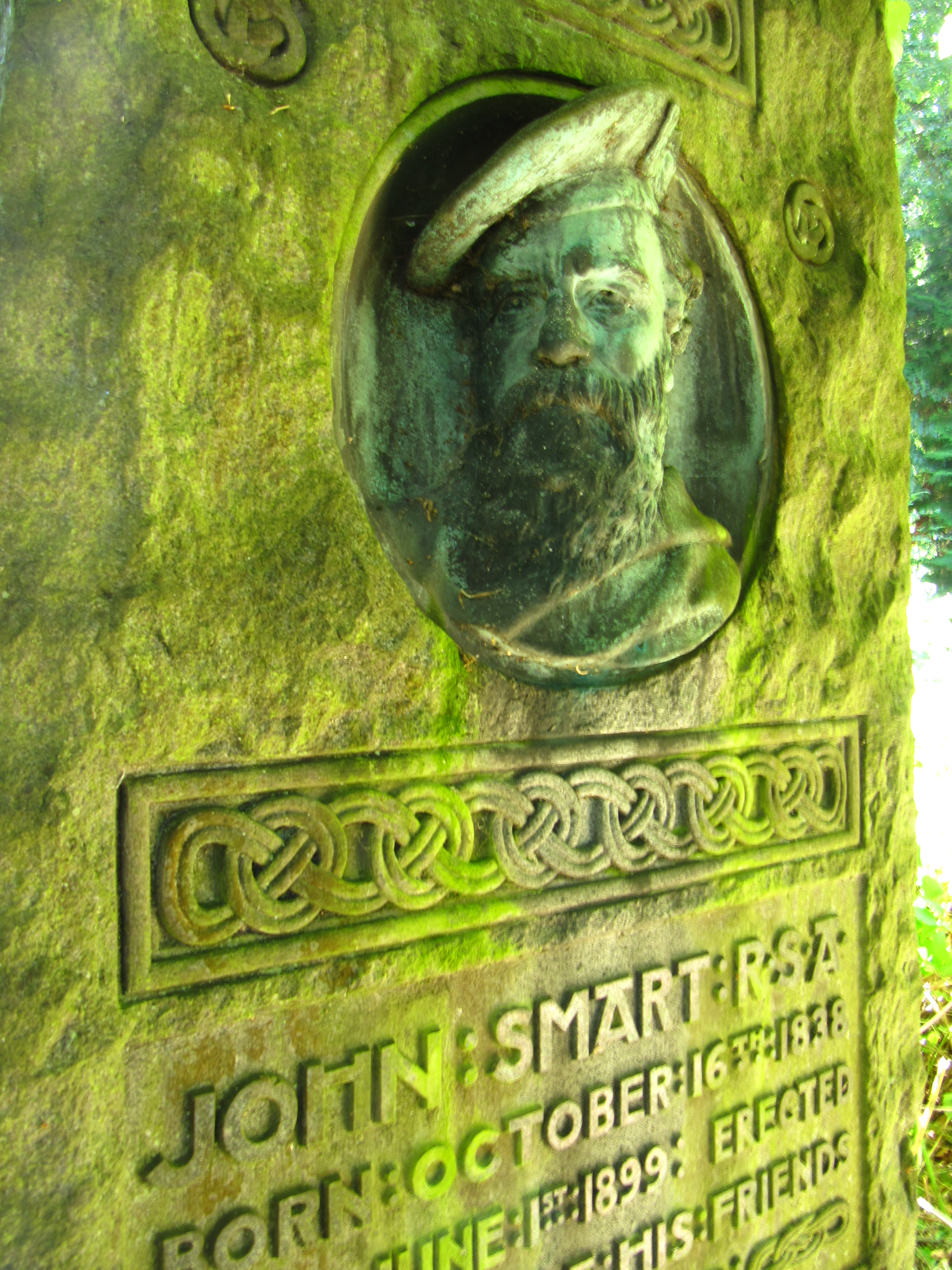
Gravestone of John Smart at Warriston Cemetery

John Smart RSA RSW (16 October 1838 – 1 June 1899) was a Scottish landscape painter, painting in both oils and watercolour. He was a keen golfer and is perhaps best known for his early paintings of golf courses in Scotland such as "The Golf Greens of Scotland".

== Life ==
John Smart was born at 13 Annandale Street off Leith Walk, the son of Emily Margaret Morton and Robert Campbell Smart (d.1871), an engraver operating from 20 Elm Row.

He was educated at Leith High School, and then studied art at the School of Manufacturers, with the intention of becoming an engraver like his father. After showing talent for landscape painting, he instead became a pupil of Horatio McCulloch. He was one of the founder members of the Royal Scottish Society of Painters in Watercolour and he was elected to the Royal Scottish Academy in 1877 after first being elected an associate in 1871.

Smart's paintings depicted scenery from across the lowlands and highlands of Scotland. The critic James Caw said of Smart's landscape paintings, "If coarse in handling and wanting in subtlety of feeling, they are simple and effective in design, vivid in effect and powerful in execution, and breathe an ardent passion for the landscape of his native land."

Both his house and studio were at 13 Brunswick Street in Edinburgh's east end. The distinctive terraced townhouse was designed by William Henry Playfair in 1824.

He is buried with his wife, Agnes Purdie Main, in Warriston Cemetery on the north side of the central roundel.

== Works ==
- "The Golfing Greens of Scotland", a collection of twenty water-colours featuring various Scottish golf courses of the 1880s and 90’s - private collections.
- "The Gloom of Glen Ogle" - 1875 - Glasgow Museums Collections
- "A Cloudy Day, Strathearn, Perthshire" - 1896 - The University of Edinburgh Fine Art Collection
- "A Perthshire River" - 1894 - The Stirling Smith Art Gallery & Museum
- "Golden grain" - 1894 - The Stirling Smith Art Gallery and Museum
- "Autumn's Short Shadowy Days" - 1877 - Dundee Art Galleries and Museums Collection (Dundee City Council)
- "The Island Pool on the Orchy" 1889 - Private Collection
- "The Return of the Flock" 1888-91 - Private Collection
- "Young Anglers" - 1866 - Private collection
- "Glen Dochart looking to Benmore and Ben Hallam" 1884 - Private Collection
- "On the Don" - 1887 - Private Collection
- "Seaside" - 1899 - Private Collection
