= Frederick Gardiner (radiologist) =

Scottish radiologist and dermatologist

Frederick Gardiner FRSE FRCSE FRSM (1874- 8 September 1933) was a Scottish radiologist and dermatologist.

== Life ==
Gardiner was born in Edinburgh in 1874 the son of John Gardiner and his wife Isabella. He studied medicine at the University of Edinburgh graduating MB CM in 1895. He then worked as a Resident first at Stirling Royal Infirmary, then at Dundee Royal Asylum. He returned to Edinburgh for further study, gaining a diploma in Public Health in 1901. He took on a role as Leith Hospital's radiologist in 1901. He gained his doctorate (MD) in 1902 writing his thesis on x-ray use in pulmonary tuberculosis.

From 1904 he worked as Assistant Physician at the Edinburgh Royal Infirmary. In 1912 he became a senior Physician and also began lecturing in dermatology at the University of Edinburgh and in extramural classes. He did much to pioneer (in retrospect now seen as a mistake) the use of x-rays in treating of skin diseases. He also worked with Sir Robert Philip on the use of x-rays to diagnose tuberculosis.

He lived close to both University and Infirmary, at 9 George Square in Edinburgh (now demolished).

During the First World War he worked at Bangour Village Hospital advising on issues relating to the skin, and building its later reputation for work on skin grafts for burn victims.

He was elected a Fellow of the Royal Society of Edinburgh in 1923. His proposers were Sir Edmund Taylor Whittaker, Sir James Alfred Ewing, David Gibb, and Arthur Crichton Mitchell.

He died at home in Manor Place, Edinburgh, following a long illness (thought to be skin cancer induced by over-use of x-rays), on 8 September 1933. He was cremated at Warriston Crematorium on 11 September.

== Publications ==
See

- Handbook of Skin Diseases (1919)
- Occupational Dermatitis (as part of British Journal of Dermatology and Syphilis 1922)
- Sebhorrhoea (1932)

== Family ==
He was the father of John Percival Gardiner.
