= Warriston Cemetery =

Cemetery in Edinburgh, Scotland

Coordinates: 55.969°N 3.198°W

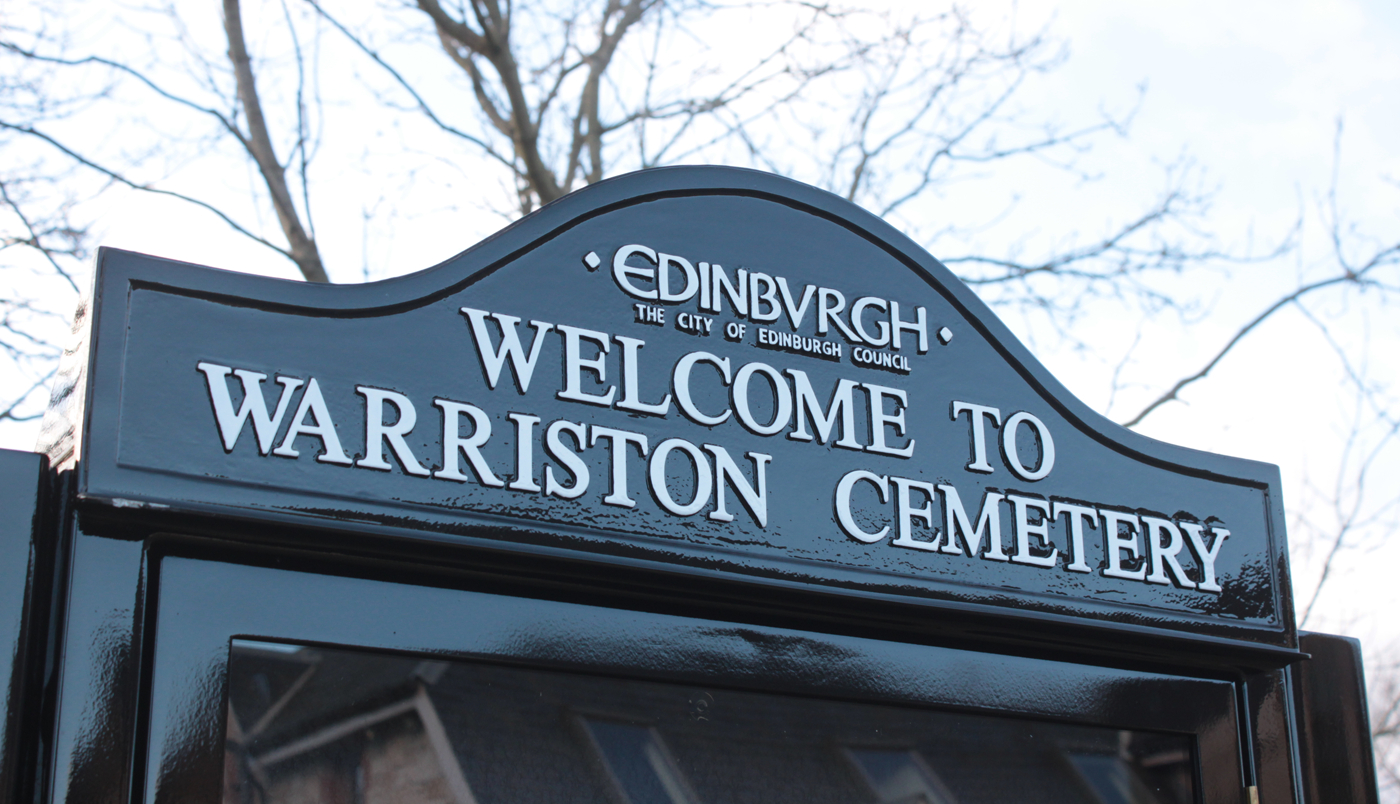
City of Edinburgh Council notice board installed February 12, 2018

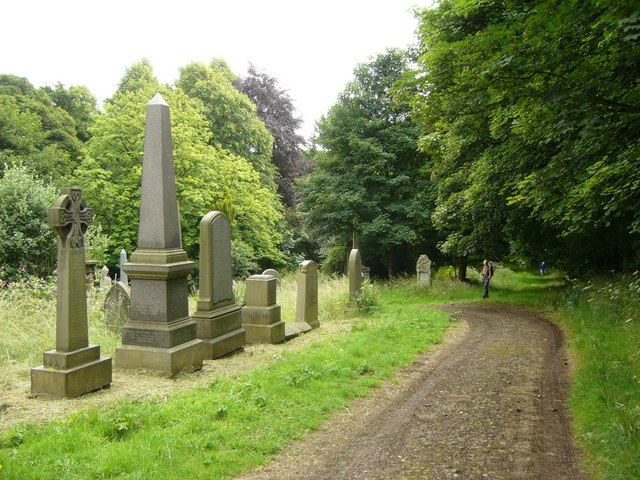
Warriston Cemetery

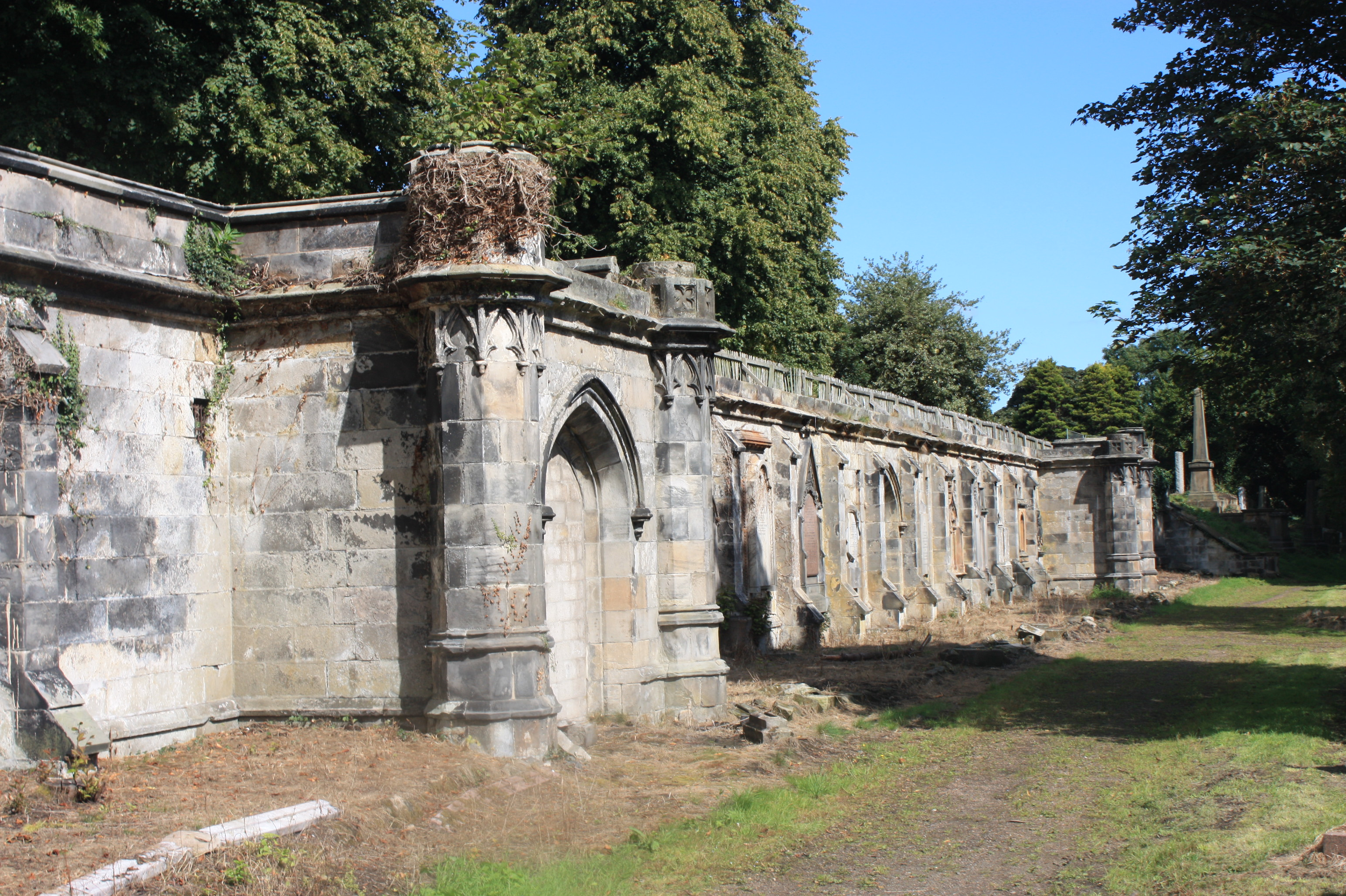
Central vaults, Warriston Cemetery

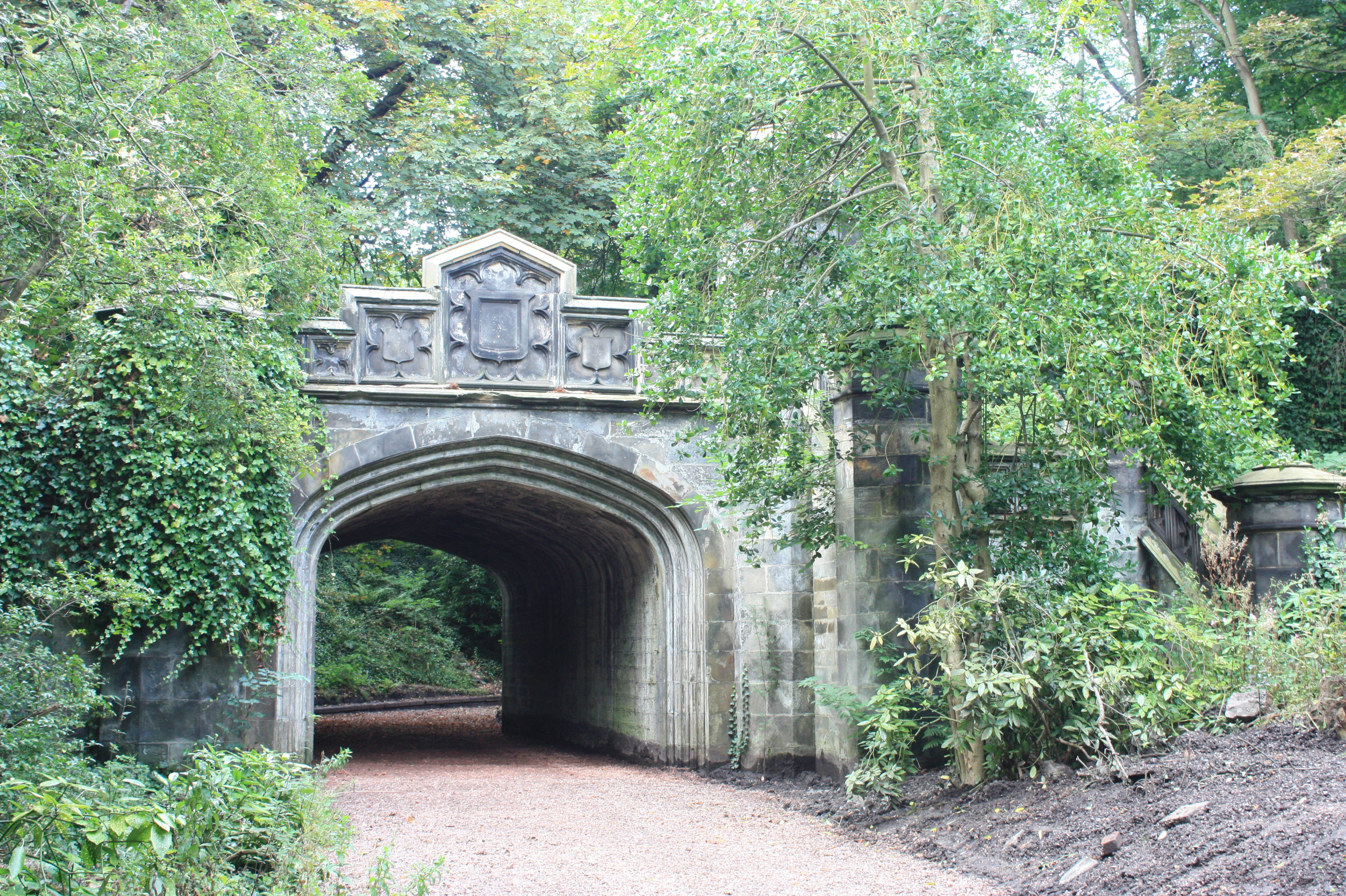
The railway bridge, Warriston Cemetery

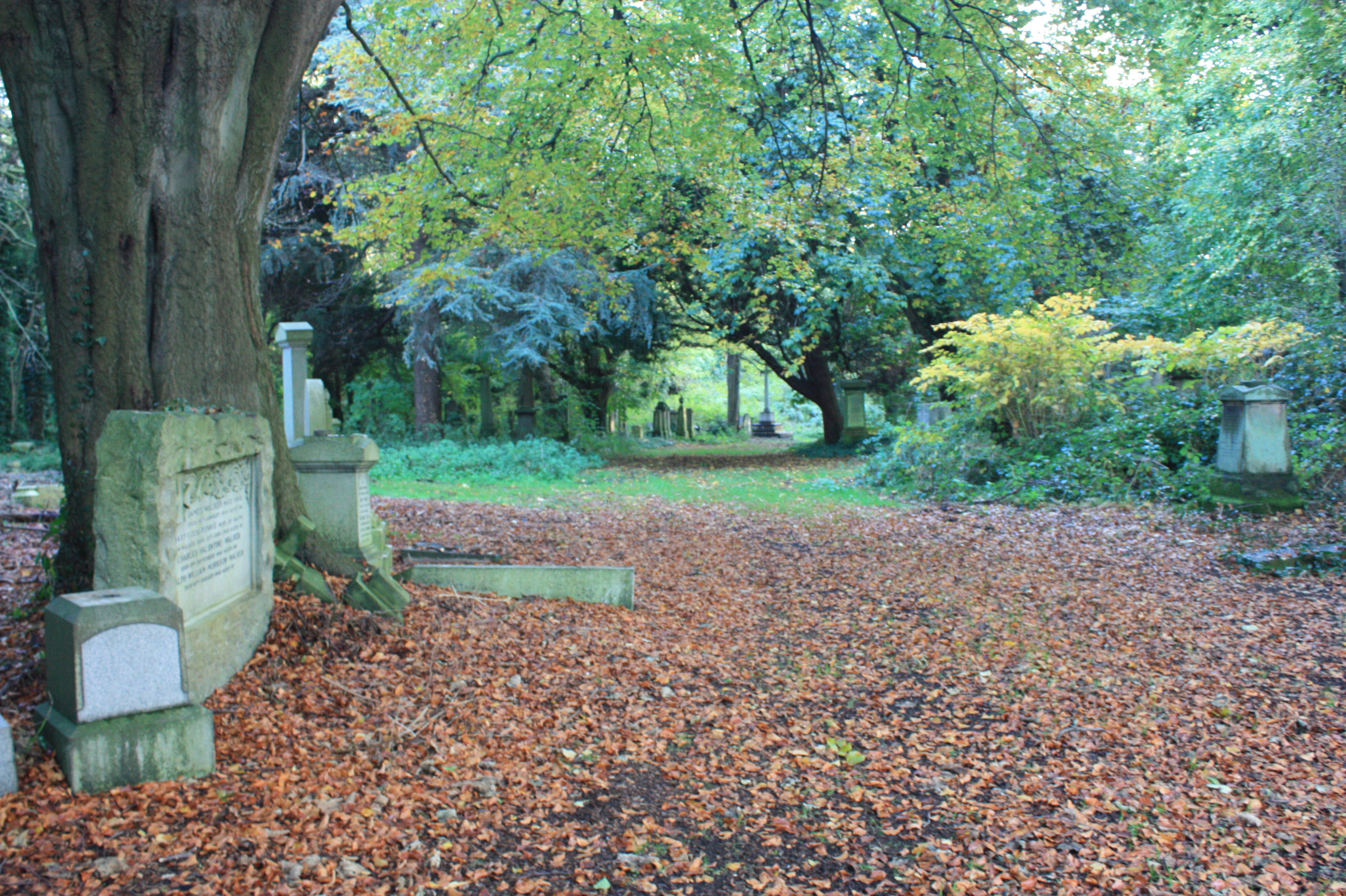
Warriston Cemetery looking down the south-west path to the war memorial

Warriston Cemetery is a cemetery in Edinburgh. It lies in Warriston, one of the northern suburbs of Edinburgh, Scotland. It was built by the then newly-formed Edinburgh Cemetery Company, and occupies around 9.24 hectares / 22.8 acres of land on a slightly sloping site. It contains many tens of thousands of graves, including notable Victorian and Edwardian figures, the most eminent being the physician Sir James Young Simpson.

It is located on the north side of the Water of Leith, and has an impressive landscape; partly planned, partly unplanned due to recent neglect. It lies in the Inverleith Conservation Area and is also a designated Local Nature Conservation Site. The cemetery is protected as a Category A listed building.

In July 2013 the Friends of Warriston Cemetery was inaugurated to reveal the heritage and to encourage appropriate biodiversity.

The address of the cemetery is 40C Warriston Gardens, Edinburgh EH3 5NE.

== History ==
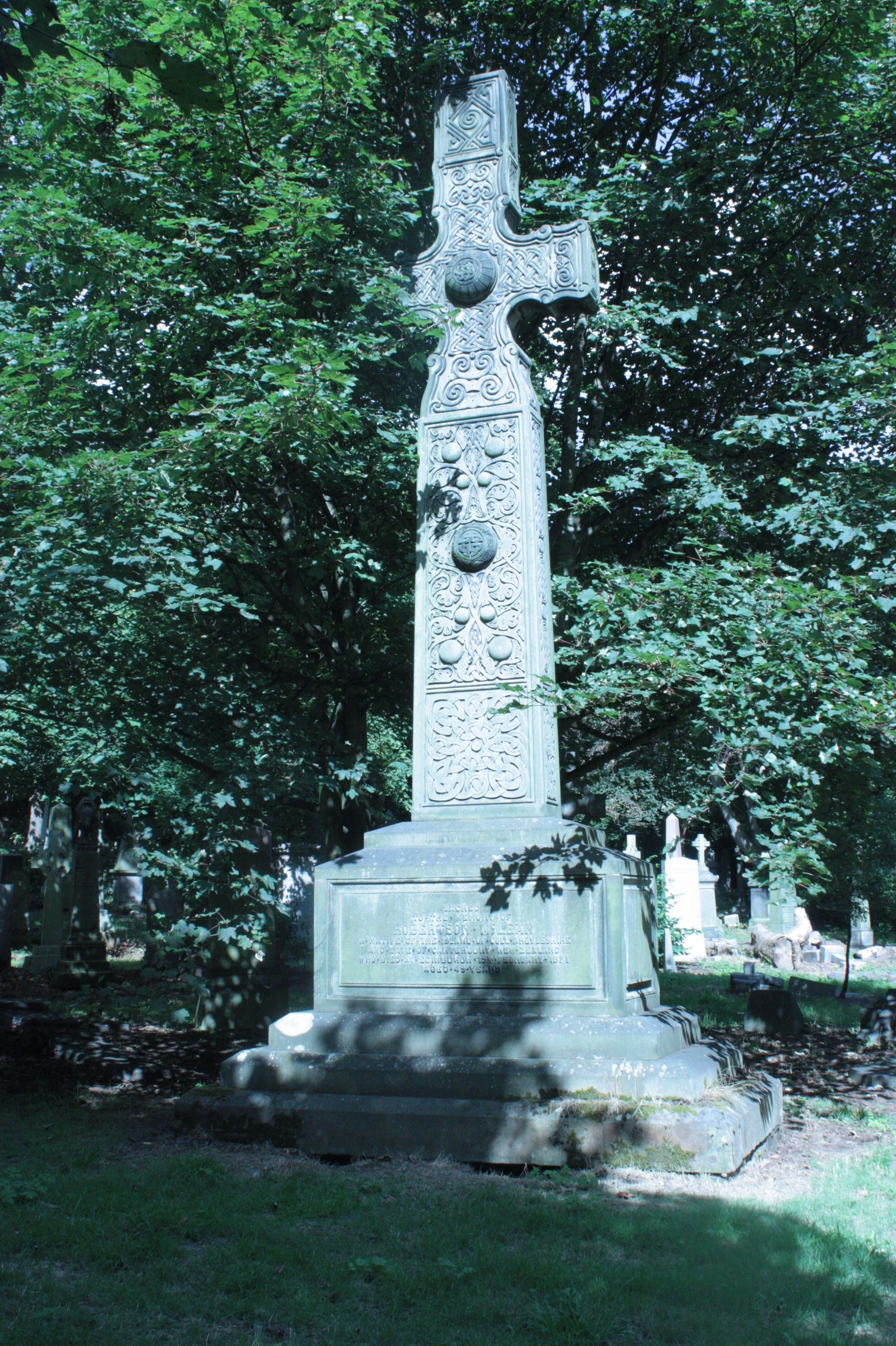
The 8m high granite cross to Robertson McLean (1822–1871) by McGlashan (1807–1873), Warriston Cemetery

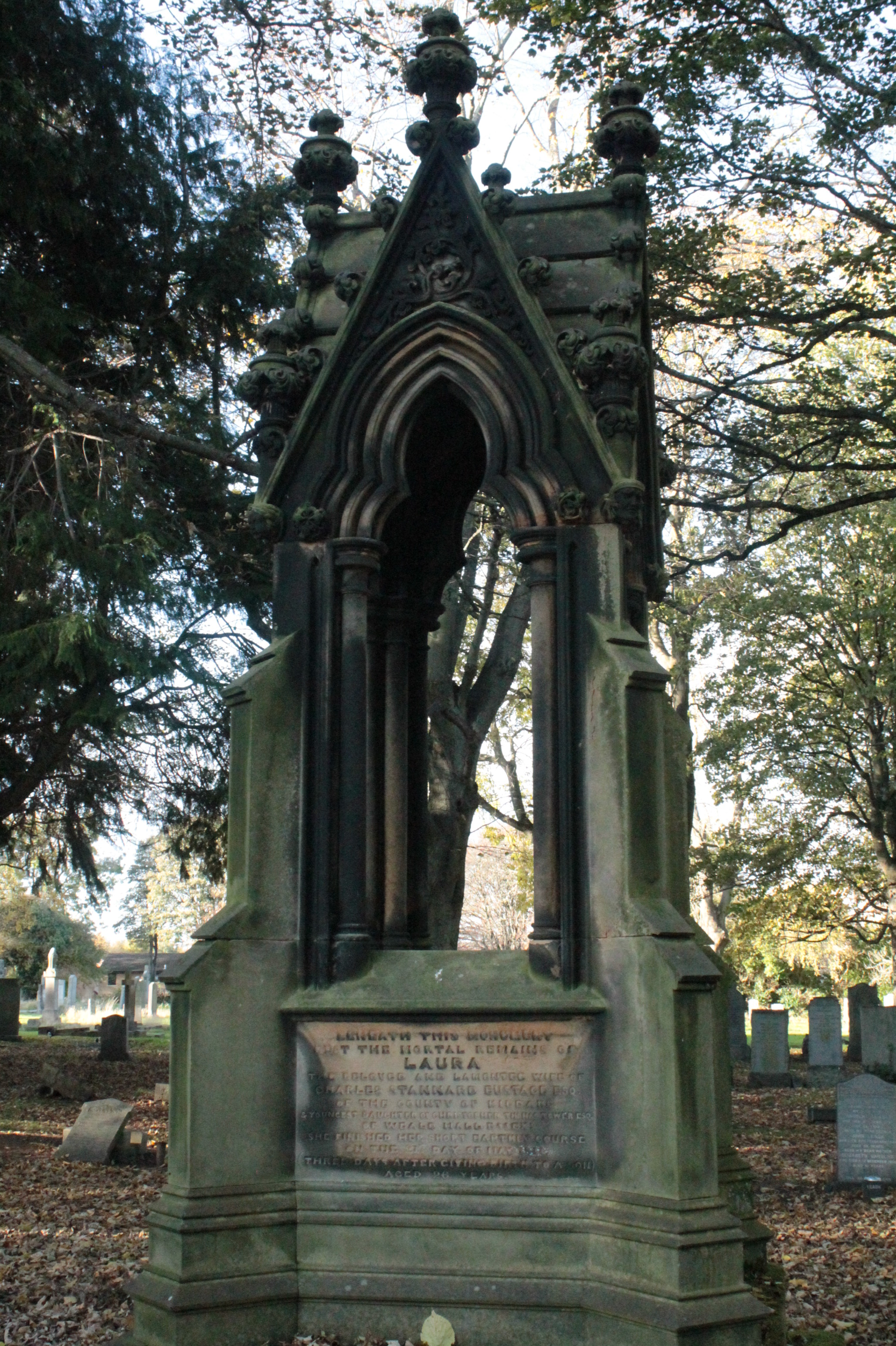
The Gothic memorial to Laura Eustace in Warriston Cemetery

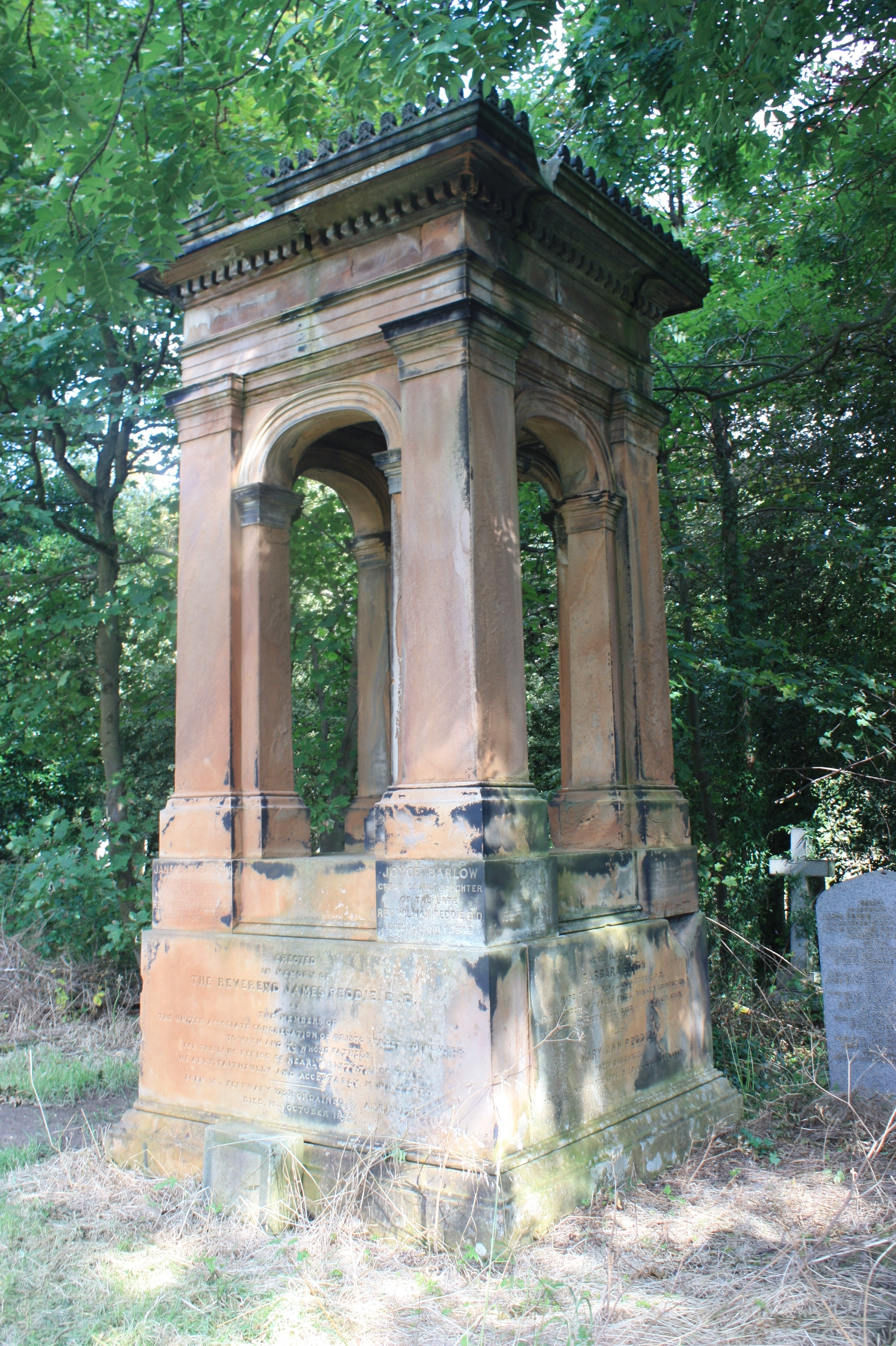
The large monument to Revs. William and James Peddie, Warriston Cemetery

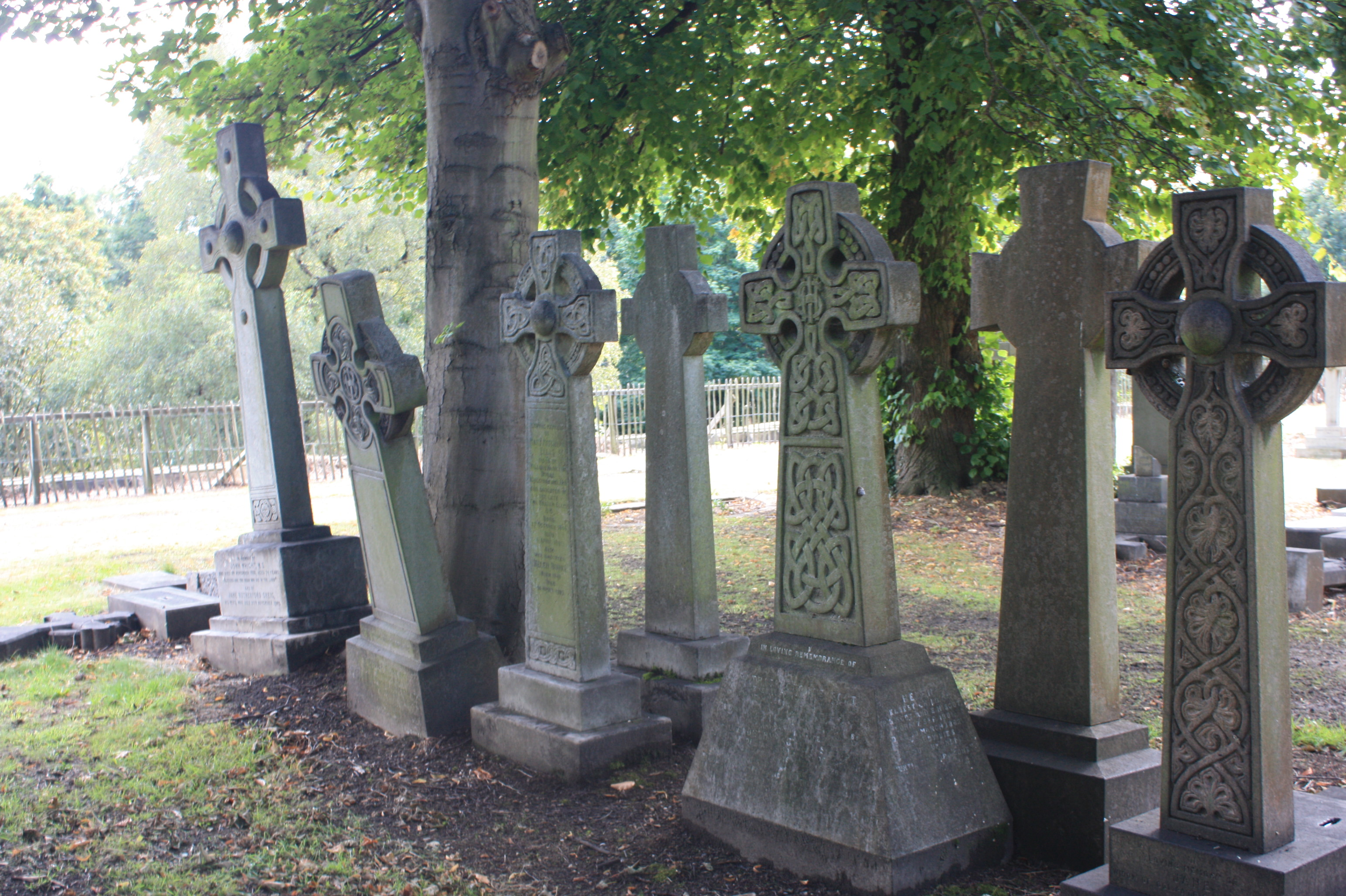
Group of Celtic crosses by McGlashen, Warriston Cemetery

Designed in 1842 by Edinburgh architect David Cousin, the cemetery opened in 1843: the directors included Cousin and James Peddie (father of John Dick Peddie).

The first interment was towards the east, Margaret Parker, who was buried on 3 June 1843.

It was the first garden cemetery in Edinburgh, allowing the simplistic original title of The Edinburgh Cemetery, and provided a model for several other Scottish cemeteries. In its own right it was broadly based on ideas first introduced at Kensal Green Cemetery in London. Designed elements include a neo-Tudor line of catacombs. Their length was doubled in 1862 by architect John Dick Peddie. The chapel that once stood on top of the catacombs was demolished by 1930.

Soon after instigation (in 1845) the cemetery was divided by the Edinburgh Leith and Newhaven Railway which was built east to west through its southern half. A tunnel was added, with Gothic archways at its mouths, to link the north and south sections, but the south being smaller, was the inferior area from this date onwards. The embankments of the railway have been partly removed following its closure in the 1950s, and the line is now a public walkway.

In 1929, the Edinburgh Cemetery Company expanded their business into the new field of cremation, converting East Warriston House (1818) into Warriston Crematorium on an adjacent site to the east. The architect was Sir Robert Lorimer, hence the title Lorimer Chapel for the main chapel. The crematorium was extended to the west in 1967 by the architect Esme Gordon. The cemetery lodge to the north-west dates from 1931 and was designed by architect J. R. McKay.

The cemetery was in private ownership until 1994, when it was compulsorily purchased by the City of Edinburgh Council. The long task of restoring the heavily overgrown and vandalised cemetery has begun, but still has far to go. Currently, only the upper (westmost) section is maintained. Many sections are now so densely overgrown that the stones are no longer visible and are simply bumps in the green undergrowth.

The cemetery features areas overgrown with vegetation, with headstones and tombs covered in ivy and surrounded by deciduous trees.

== Monuments of architectural note ==
The Robertson Mausoleum was erected in 1865 for Mary Ann Robertson (1826–1858), daughter of Brigadier-General Manson of the Bombay Artillery. The white marble shrine contained a sculpture of a reclining female figure, and was topped by a red glass roof, leading to the local nickname, the Tomb of the Red Lady. The effigy of Mrs. Robertson and a series of incised scenes representing the Lord's Prayer on the exterior of the mausoleum were carved by sculptor Henry Stormonth Leifchild (1823–1884) The monument was heavily vandalised in the 1980s and 1990s and had to be demolished.

Sir James Young Simpson's grave remains visible but the lower section has been infilled with earth to provide space for further burial.

Several eminent sculptors' work is found in the cemetery, including a fine portrait of William Young, horticulturist (1816–1896) by William Birnie Rhind, a monument to Robert Bryson by Thomas Stuart Burnett, and a wealth of fine ornate Celtic crosses by the McGlashens. A sizeable arched pedestal to the Rev James Peddie (d. 1845) by John Dick Peddie is also of note.

== Notable persons interred and cremated ==
=== Interred ===
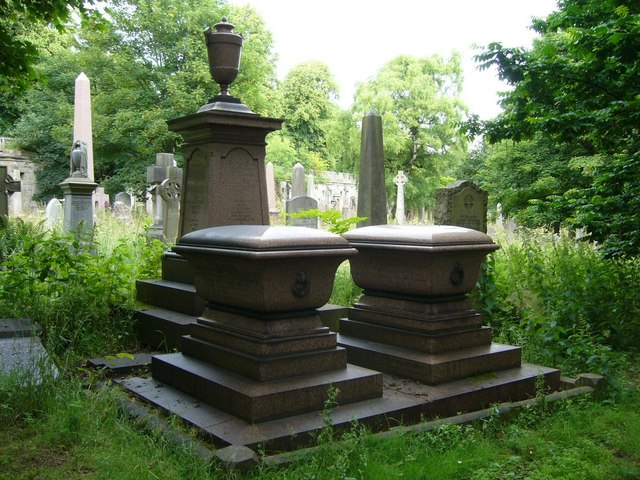
19th-century tomb of Sir William Taylour Thomson and his wife

- George Aikman (1830–1905) artist and engraver
- Joseph Anderson (antiquarian) (1832–1916) keeper of the National Museum of Antiquities, and his son David Anderson, Lord St Vigeans
- Robert Rowand Anderson (1834–1921) architect
- George Angus (architect) (1798–1845)
- John Hutton Balfour (1808–1884) botanist
- Dr William Beilby (1783–1849) physician
- Thomas Vernon Bell MD (1824-1903) homeopath
- Adam Black (1784–1874), publisher, Lord Provost and Member of Parliament for Edinburgh
- Samuel Blackburn (1813–1856) portrait artist
- Hippolyte Blanc (1844–1917), architect
- William Graham Boss (1847–1927) stained glass designer
- Major General James Roper Boswall (1826–1883)
- John Crawford Brown (1805–1867) landscape artist
- Sir William Slater Brown (1844-1917) Lord Provost of Edinburgh 1909-12
- William Alexander Bryson FRSE (d. 1906) creator of the public electric lighting system in Leith in 1897 (one of the first in the world) - stone vandalised
- Alexander Buchan (meteorologist) (1829–1907), creator of the map-based weather forecast
- Sir John James Burnet (1857–1938), architect
- Archibald Burns (1831–1880), photographer
- Rev Dugald Butler (1862-1926) author (in the Marwick grave)
- William Archibald Cadell FRSE (1775–1855) historian, mathematician and owner of the Carron Company
- James Cadenhead (1858–1927) artist
- Dr Colin Cadman (1916–1971), plant pathologist and mycologist
- Robert Macfarlane Cameron (1860–1920) architect
- Lorne MacLaine Campbell (1902–1991) Victoria Cross recipient
- Sir John Cheyne (1841–1907)
- Sir Thomas Clark (1823–1900), Lord Provost of Edinburgh (1865–1888)
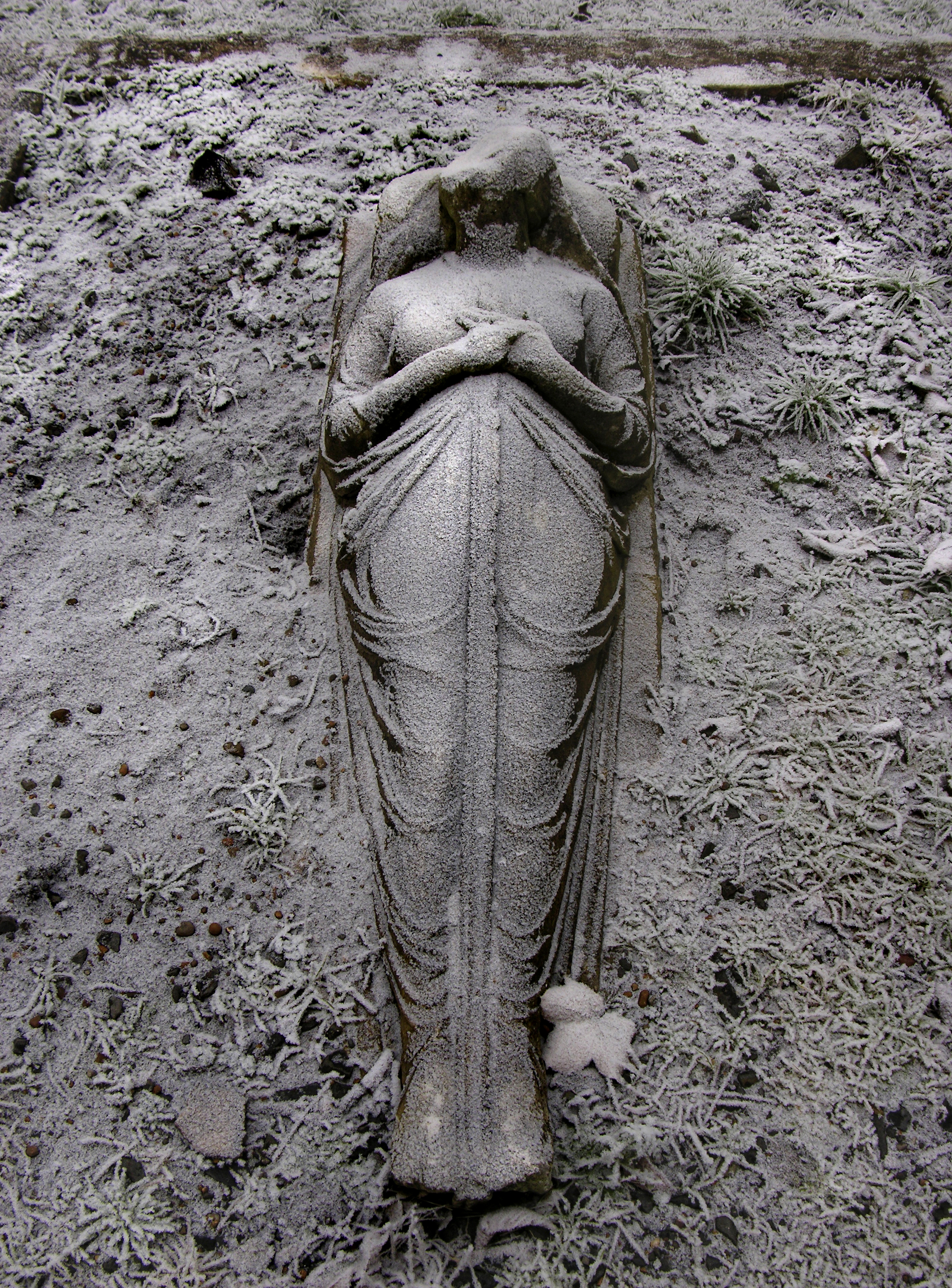
  The Red Lady tomb, Mary Ann Robertson (1826–58), Warriston Cemetery
- James Scarth Combe (1795-1883) physician
- Prof Arthur Connell (1794–1863), FRSE
- Alexander Hunter Crawford (1865–1945) architect
- William Crawford (1858-1926) creator of Crawfords Biscuits
- Mary Crudelius (1839–1877) early campaigner for female education
- John Cumming (artist) (1824–1908) father of William Skeoch Cumming
- John Cunningham (architect) (1799–1873)
- James Currie (shipowner) (1863–1930), owner of the Currie Line
- Commodore James Dalgleish (1891–1964)
- Sir David Deas (1807–1876), naval physician, with his architect son, Francis William Deas (1862–1951)
- George Deas, Lord Deas (1804–1887)
- William H. Dowbiggin (1780–1848) veteran of the Battle of Waterloo, son-in-law of William Maule, 1st Baron Panmure
- Sir David Dumbreck (1805–1876) memorial only
- John Gillison Dunbar (1874–1958) creator of Dunbar's lemonade
- General Alexander Duncan (1780-1859)
- Thomas Duncan (painter) (1807–1845)
- David Dundas, Lord Dundas (1854–1922) judge
- Robert William Dundas, MC, Legion of Honour, (1881–1928) military hero and solicitor, co-founder of Dundas & Wilson
- Elizabeth Marianne Erskine (1871–1942) early female surgeon
- David Taylor Fish FRHA (1824–1901) botanist and author
- William Flockhart (1809–1871) chemist, joint founder of Duncan Flockhart & Co
- Robert Gavin (1827–1883) artist
- Robert Gibb (1845–1932), artist, most remembered for the painting The Thin Red Line and his elder brother William Gibb (1839-1929)
- Robert Fleming Gourlay (1778–1863) Scottish-Canadian politician
- Frederick Richard Graham-Yooll (died 1931) inventor
- Andrew Grant (MP) (1830–1924) Liberal politician
- Very Rev James Grant DD FRSE (1800–1890) Director of Scottish Widows 1840 to 1890 and Moderator of the General Assembly of the Church of Scotland in 1854, father of above Andrew Grant
- Prof John Russell Greig FRSE (1889–1963) veterinarian and creator of "clean milk"
- Sir Louis Stewart Gumley (1870–1941), Lord Provost of Edinburgh 1935–38
- Samuel Halkett (1814–1877) librarian and author
- Sir George Harrison (1812–1885), Lord Provost of Edinburgh 1882-5
- Sir George Harvey (1805–1876) artist.
- David Ramsay Hay (1798–1866) artist and author
- Alfred Trevor Haynes (1907–1969) President of the Faculty of Actuaries 1962–64
- Dr John Henderson (1818-1901) surgeon, twice Provost of Leith
- Alexander Henry (gunsmith) (1818–1894), gunmaker, First Edinburgh Rifle Volunteer, JP and Edinburgh Town Councillor
- James Howie (1845–1910) photographer
- John Howkins (civil engineer) (1840–1966)
- Edith Hughes (architect) (1888–1971) Scotland's first female architect
- William Hurst (civil engineer) (1810–1890) Scottish engineer linked to the early development of railways
- Robert Kirk Inches (1845-1918) Lord Provost of Edinburgh 1912-16 (one of the few graves of interest in the south section)
- Cosmo Innes (1798–1874) judge, author and antiquarian. A member of the Edinburgh Calotype Club one of the world's first photographic societies
- Professor Robert Jameson (1774–1854), naturalist and mineralogist
- Feliks Janiewicz (1762–1848), Polish composer and violinist in exile
- James Jardine (1776–1858) civil engineer
- Alexander Karley RN (1785-1859) Royal Navy Commander of ships such as HMS Apollo
- Alexander Keiller (1811–1892), physician and obstetrician; introduced gynaecological teaching into the Edinburgh Medical School
- Philip Kelland (1808–1879), English mathematician
- John Falconer King FIC FCS (1846–1919) Edinburgh city analyst
- Count Walerian Krasiński (1795–1855), Polish Calvinist politician, nationalist and historian
- Robert Scott Lauder (1803–1869), artist (monument by John Hutchison)
- James Eckford Lauder (1811–1869), artist, buried with his older brother Robert Scott Lauder
- Rev Prof Alexander Lawson DD (1852–1921) professor of English Literature at St Andrews University
- Thomas Livingstone Learmonth (1818–1903) Tasmanian politician, nephew of John Learmonth
- Charles Lees RSA (1800–1880) artist
- John Allan Lindsay (1865–1942) the final Provost of Leith 1917–1920
- Hilda Lockhart Lorimer (1873–1954) classical scholar, and her brother John Gordon Lorimer (1870-1914)
- Professor David Low (1786–1859), agriculturalist
- William Henry Lowe MD (1815-1900) physician and botanist
- Charles Somerville MacAlester (1797–1891) - grave vandalised
- Horatio McCulloch (1806–1867), artist (monument by John Rhind)
- Very Rev Robert MacDonald (1813-1893) Moderator of the General Assembly of the Free Church of Scotland in 1882
- Robert MacFarlane, Lord Ormidale (1802–1880) judge
- Stewart McGlashan (1807–1873) sculptor
- Alastair Macintyre (1913-1979) broadcaster
- Gillian Maclaine (1798–1840) adventurer, memorial only - lost at sea with his family
- Sir John Lorne MacLeod (1873–1946) Lord Provost of Edinburgh 1916 to 1919
- The Very Rev John McMurtrie DD (1831–1912) Moderator of the General Assembly of the Church of Scotland in 1904
- Prof William Ramsay McNab (1844–1889), botanist (memorial on parents' grave)
- Duncan McNeill, 1st Baron Colonsay and Oronsay (1793–1874), advocate and Tory politician; Lord Justice General and Lord President of the Court of Session (1852–1867)
- Charles Hodge Mackie (1862-1920) artist
- Sir Richard Mackie (1851–1923) Provost of Leith, 1899 to 1908
- Very Rev Thomas Main (1813-1881) Moderator of the General Assembly of the Free Church of Scotland
- Sir James David Marwick (1826–1908)
- Very Rev Alexander Martin DD LLD (1857–1946) Principal of New College, Edinburgh
- Frances Helen Melville (1873 – 1962) suffragist, academic
- John Menzies (1808–1879), founder of the national newsagent chain bearing his name
- Thomas Menzies (1847–1901), major shipbuilder in Leith
- Prof Thomas Hugh Milroy LLD FRSE (1869–1950) physiologist, organic chemist and Vice President of the Royal Society of Edinburgh
- Hugh Morton (1812–1878) civil engineer
- Claud Muirhead (1835–1910) owner and editor of the Edinburgh Advertiser
- Charles Murray, Lord Murray (1866–1936) judge, and his son, Keith Anderson Hope Murray (1903–1993)
- Charles Neaves, Lord Neaves (1800–1876) Scottish judge
- Patrick Neill (naturalist) (1776–1851)
- William Nicol (1770–1851), physicist and geologist
- Alexander Nicolson (1827–1893) scholar and mountaineer
- Cpt John Orr (died 1879) who fought at Waterloo
- John H. Oswald (1830–1899) landscape artist
- George Outram (1805–1856), humorist and editor of the Glasgow Herald
- Walter Gray Pattison (1829–1890) whisky distiller and blender (in "secret garden")
- Sir William Peck (1862–1925), astronomer
- Alexander Peddie (1810–1907), physician and author; and his nephew--
- John Dick Peddie (1824–1891), architect (see above)
- David Bruce Peebles (1819–1892) engineer
- Major General Robert Pitman CB HEIC (1777-1846)
- James Pocock (1777–1857) veteran of the Battle of Waterloo
- James Pringle (1822–1886), businessman and Provost of Leith (1881–86)
- Harold Raeburn (1865–1926), mountaineer
- Richard Ramage (1834–1920) co-founder of Ramage & Ferguson shipbuilders in Leith
- Alexander Ramsay (1777–1847), architect
- John Rhind (1828–1892), sculptor (also his sons William Birnie Rhind and Thomas Duncan Rhind in the same plot)
- Dr William Robertson FRSE (1818–1882), physician and statistician
- John Merry Ross LLD (1833–1883) author
- John Sheriff (1816-1844) ARSA, artist - one of the first burials
- John Siveright (1779–1856), of the Hudson's Bay Company
- Sir James Young Simpson (1811–1870), pioneer of anaesthetics
- John Smart (landscape artist) (1838–1899)
- Alexander Smith (1829–1867), Scottish poet (monument carved by John Rhind)
- John Smith (1825–1910), surgeon and dentist, FRSE, FRCS, founder of the Edinburgh Dental Hospital, Queen Victoria's dentist
- Malcolm Smith (Scottish politician) (1856–1935), MP plus Provost of Leith 1908–17
- Rev Walter Chalmers Smith (1824–1908) hymn-writer
- John Stevenson (1790–1831) Sir Walter Scott's "True Jock"
- Prof Charles Hunter Stewart FRSE (1854–1924) public health expert
- Archibald Buchanan Stirling (1811-1881) conservator (south section)
- James Hutchison Stirling (1820–1909) philosopher
- Admiral Pringle Stoddart (1768–1848)
- Sir John Struthers (1823–1899), surgeon and anatomist
- John Stuart (antiquarian) (1813–1877)
- Captain Francis Stupart (Scots Greys), Cavalry Officer who fought in the Battle of Waterloo
- William Swan (physicist) (1818–1894) FRSE (in "secret garden") discoverer of the Swan band
- Sir William Taylour Thomson (1813–1883) military officer and diplomat (a noteworthy double sarcophagus paired with his wife)
- Thomas Jameson Torrie (d. 1858), advocate, geologist, mineralogist and botanist
- Sir John Batty Tuke (1835–1913) eminent psychiatrist
- Dr Catherine Jane Urquhart (1845–1902) early female doctor (graduated from the London School of Medicine for Women in 1892)
- George Waterston (1808–1893) stationer, founder of Waterston &sons, not to be confused with the Bookshop
- William Williams (1832–1900), Welsh veterinary surgeon, principal of the Dick Vet College
- Dr Andrew Wood (1810–1881) President of the Royal College of Surgeons of Edinburgh

=== Cremated ===
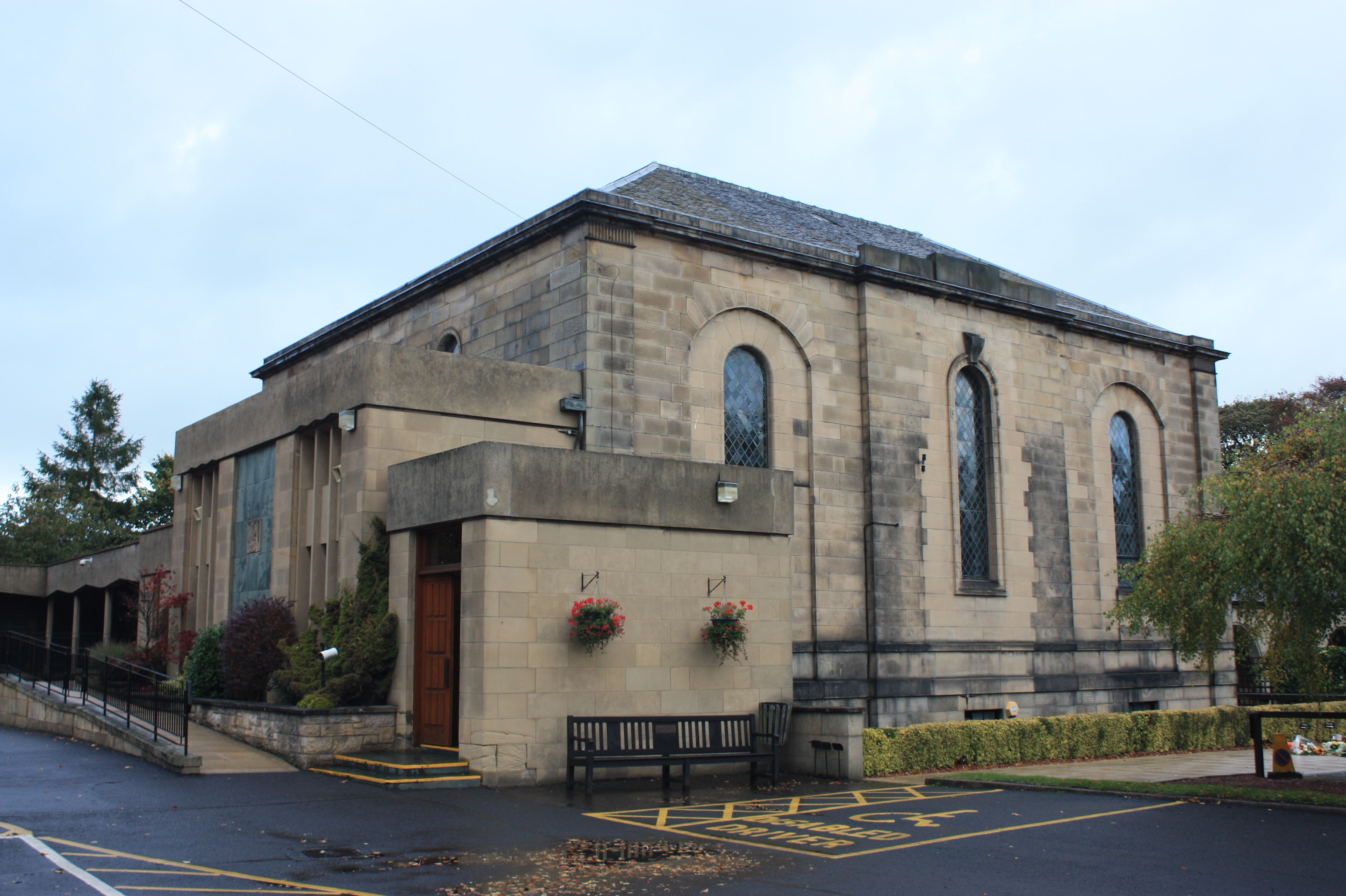
Warriston Crematorium, Edinburgh

Warriston Crematorium is a privately-run entity on a separate site, east of the main cemetery. It has several areas of remembrance, the oldest being the oak-panelled rooms in the basement. To the north, there is both a Rose Garden and Water Garden holding memorials. The Book of Remembrance is opened to the date each day, for those marking the anniversary of a death. A computerised version of the Book of Remembrance is also available, enabling other dates to be viewed.

- Alfred Adler (1870–1937), Austrian psychotherapist and founder of the school of individual psychology. Moved April 2011 to Austria
- Sapper Adam Archibald (1879–1957), VC recipient World War I
- Captain Charles George Bonner (1884–1951), Royal Navy Victoria Cross recipient World War I.
- Anthony Chenevix-Trench (1919–1979), Headmaster of Eton and Fettes Colleges
- Brigadier Arthur Edward Cumming (1896–1971), VC recipient, Malaya, World War II
- Frederick Gardiner (radiologist) FRSE (1874–1933), dermatologist and x-ray pioneer/martyr
- Andrew Gilzean (1877–1957) MP
- Tom Hart (1922–1982) chairman of Hibernian Football Club
- Sir Robert Lorimer (1868–1929), architect. One of the first cremations, his ashes are buried with his parents at Newburn, Fife.
- Lieutenant David Lowe MacIntyre (1895–1967), Army VC recipient, World War I
- Ebenezer James MacRae (1881–1951), City Architect for Edinburgh
- Sir Frank Mears (1880–1953) architect and town planner
- Don Revie (1927–1989), English footballer and manager
- Captain Henry Peel Ritchie (1879–1958), Royal Navy VC recipient, East Africa, World War I
- Drum-Major Walter Potter Ritchie (1892–1965), VC recipient, Battle of the Somme, World War I
- Colonel Theodore Salvesen (1863-1942)
- Prof James Lorrain Smith (1862–1931) anatomist
- Alexander Burns Wallace (1906-1974) Scottish plastic surgeon
- Sir Charles Laing Warr (1892–1969), Minister of The High Church of St Giles, Edinburgh, and Dean of the Thistle and Chapel Royal Scotland (1926–1969)

== War graves ==
Warriston Cemetery contains 100 graves of Commonwealth service personnel, 72 from World War I and 27 from World War II, besides a grave of a Belgian soldier. The cemetery also contains a CWGC memorial, at the end of the columbarium, in the form of panels listing 154 Commonwealth service personnel of World War II who were cremated here.

== Botanical ==
Among trees of note in Warriston Cemetery are two purple-leaved elms and a concave-leaved elm, both among the rarer of pre-Dutch Elm Disease cultivars.
