= Adam Archibald =

Recipient of the Victoria Cross

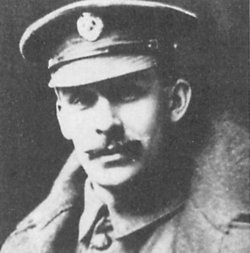
- Born: 14 January 1879; Leith, Edinburgh, Scotland
- Died: 10 March 1957 (aged 78); Leith, Edinburgh, Scotland
- Burial place: Warriston Crematorium, Edinburgh
- Military career
- Allegiance: United Kingdom
- Branch: British Army
- Service years: 1915–1919
- Rank: Sapper
- Units: Durham Light Infantry; Royal Engineers
- Conflicts: First World War: Western Front; Hundred Days Offensive; Battle of the Sambre-Oise Canal (WIA); Allied intervention in North Russia
- Awards: Victoria Cross

Adam Archibald VC (14 January 1879 – 10 March 1957) was a Scottish First World War recipient of the Victoria Cross, the highest and most prestigious award for gallantry in the face of the enemy that can be awarded to British and Commonwealth forces.

== Military service ==
In 1915, Archibald enlisted with the 7th Durham Light Infantry before transferring to the 218th Field Company, Royal Engineers, with whom he was serving during the second battle of the Sambre. At the age of 39, he was awarded the Victoria Cross for action while his unit was attempting to bridge the Sambre–Oise Canal. Archibald received his medal from King George V at Buckingham Palace in May 1919. From his citation:

On 4 November 1918 near Ors, France, Sapper Archibald was with a party building a floating bridge across the canal. He was foremost in the work under a very heavy artillery barrage and machine-gun fire. The latter was directed at him from a few yards distance while he was working on the cork floats. Nevertheless he persevered in his task and his example and efforts were such that the bridge which was essential to the success of the operations was very quickly completed. Immediately afterwards Sapper Archibald collapsed from gas poisoning.

His VC is displayed at the Royal Engineers Museum, Chatham, Kent.

Archibald was so severely gassed during the VC winning incident, that he could not return to service. He was awarded the Silver War Badge for having been honourably discharged from the army due to wounds received in the war. This was to be worn by veterans so as not to receive a white feather or be otherwise perceived as cowards by members of the public when in civilian dress.

== Personal life ==
Archibald was initiated into Freemasonry in Lodge Elgin & Bruce, No.1077 (Limekilns, Fife, Scotland) in 1912. He later affiliated to Lodge St James Operative, No.97 (Edinburgh, Scotland).

Archibald died at his home in Leith at the age of 78. He was cremated at Warriston Crematorium.

== Bibliography ==
- Gliddon, Gerald (2014) [2000]. The Final Days 1918. VCs of the First World War. The History Press. ISBN 978-0-7509-5368-9.
- Napier, Gerald (1998). The Sapper VCs: The Story of Valour in the Royal Engineers and Its Associated Corps. The Stationery Office. ISBN 978-0117728356.
- Ross, Graham (1995). Scotland's Forgotten Valour. MacLean Press. ISBN 978-1899272006.
