= Richard Mackie =

Scottish businessman (1851–1923)

Sir Richard Mackie KONS COCI (1851 – 1923) was a 19th-century Scottish businessman involved in ship brokerage and coal exporter who served as Provost of Leith from 1899 to 1908. He owned the shipping companies of Richard Mackie & Company and New Line Ltd.

== Life ==
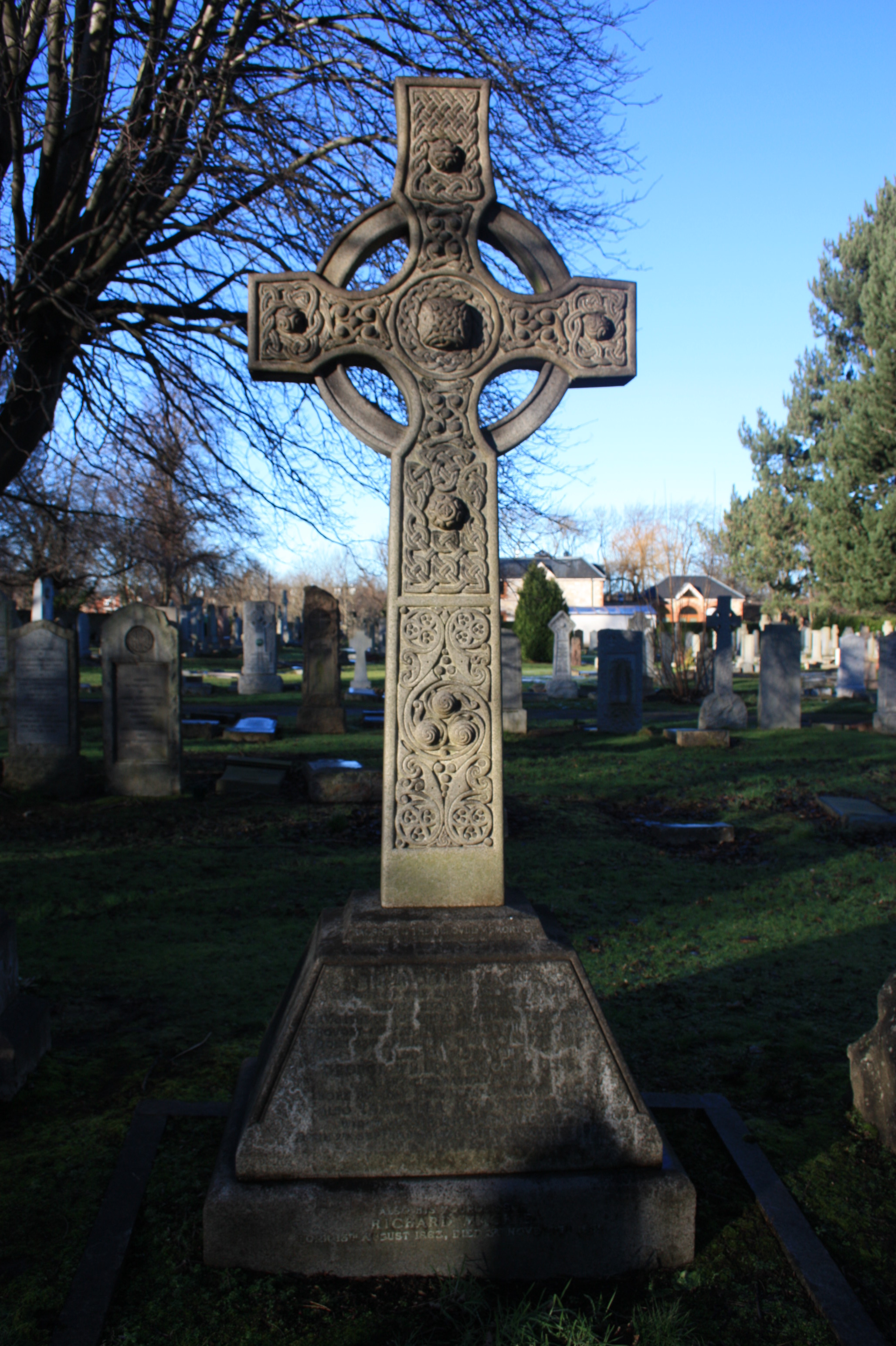
The grave of Sir Richard Mackie, Warriston Cemetery, Edinburgh

He was born in Carnock in Fife on 23 April 1851 the son of George Mackie (b.1799) and his wife Janet. In his youth his family moved to Woodhead Street in Dunfermline and he was educated there.

At an early age he joined a firm of shipbrokers in Leith which in 1873 was renamed Mackie, Koth & Co. and he became sole proprietor. The firm was renamed Richard Mackie & Co. in 1882.

In 1881 he lived at Jessfield House in the Newhaven district of Edinburgh.

In 1891 he was living at Clarebank House on Claremont Road in Leith and was operating a steamship company based at 56 Bernard Street.

His export works brought his creation as a Knight of the Order of the North Star from the King of Sweden and Chevalier of the Order of the Crown of Italy.

He died at Trinity Grove also known as Harmony Hall (the former home of William Creech) in the Trinity district of Edinburgh on 30 June 1923. He is buried in Warriston Cemetery. His grave lies close to the main entrance path to the north-west.

== Family ==
He was married to Isabella Kyd Thomson of St Andrews (1846-1923). They had four children.

His eldest son was George William Mackie RNVR OBE (1878-1923) his second son was Richard Mackie (1883-1933).

His daughter Jennie Cousin Mackie (b.1887) married an Edinburgh advocate, Napier Armit, who joined the 16th battalion Royal Scots (second Edinburgh pals battalion) in 1915. He was promoted to Captain, won the Military Cross but was killed in August 1916 on the Somme.

== Freemasonry ==
Mackie was Initiated in Lodge Trafalgar, No.223, (Leith) on 15 January, Passed on 8 November 1872 and Raised on 21 January 1873. He served as Master of the Lodge in 1910. He became the Grand Bard of the Grand Lodge of Scotland in 1913.
