= James Alfred Aitken =

Scottish painter

James Alfred Aitken (1846–1897) was a Scottish landscape painter.

== Life ==
Aitken studied art with Horatio McCulloch, before moving to Dublin. There he attended the Royal Dublin Society's school, and had Henry MacManus as teacher.

In 1872 Aitken moved to Glasgow. He exhibited at the Royal Academy, Royal Glasgow Institute of the Fine Arts and Royal Hibernian Academy.

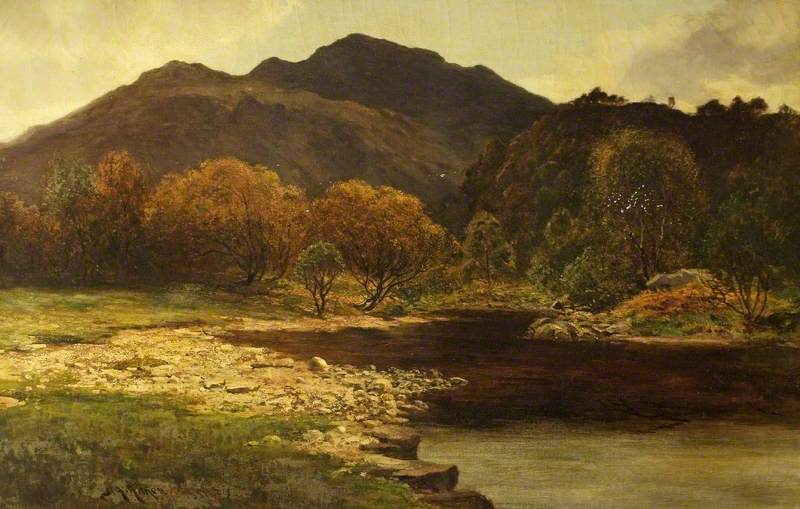
The Trossachs, 1881 painting by James Alfred Aitken
