= Gillian Maclaine =

Scottish businessman and adventurer (1798–1840)

Gillian Maclaine (1798–1840) was an early 19th century Scottish businessman and adventurer who founded the company of Maclaine Watson.

== Life ==
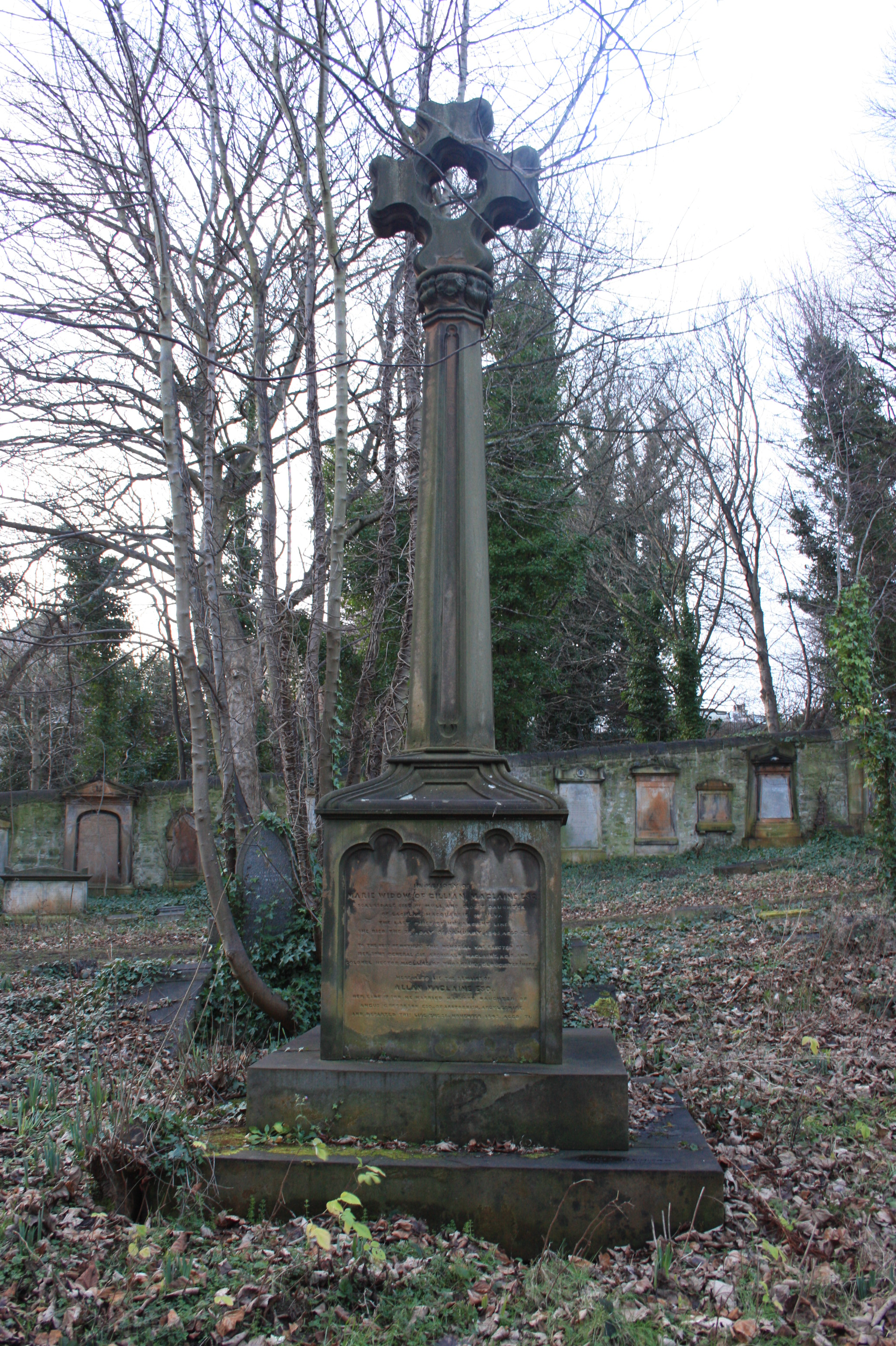
Monument to Gillian Maclaine, Warriston Cemetery, Edinburgh

He was born on the Isle of Mull on 17 June 1798, the son of Alan Maclaine of Scallasdale and his wife, Marjory Gregorson. He was educated by his uncle, John Gregorson, at Ardtornish, then sent to Oban on the mainland in 1810. He studied art at Glasgow University (without graduating), then in 1816 went to London to be apprenticed as a commodities merchant.

In May 1820 he arrived in Java and then settled in Batavia, Dutch East Indies (modern day Jakarta). In 1827 he founded, with Edward Watson, the trading company of Maclaine Watson, trading in cotton goods, coffee and opium (then regarded as a legitimate trade).

He returned to Britain due to ill-health in 1830. Eighteen months later he sailed again for Java. The ship travelled via Rotterdam where a woman embarked who soon after became his wife. In his second time in Java, his company expanded greatly, including premises in Singapore.

On 17 March 1840 he embarked on the ship "Regina" with his wife and many of her family. Shortly after the ship departed, a storm struck as the ship entered the Straits of Sunda. The ship was never seen again and was lost with all crew and passengers on 18/19 March 1840.

A monument was erected to his memory in 1842 in Warriston Cemetery in north Edinburgh, one of the first monuments in the cemetery. The connection to Edinburgh is unclear.

The monument also remembers Cpt Murdoch Maclaine, killed at the Battle of Maida in 1806, and Major John Maclaine, killed at the Battle of Waterloo in 1815. These men were the sons of Marie and Gillian Maclaine, Maclaine's uncle.

The company of Maclaine Watson survived 140 years until it was nationalised by the Indonesian government in 1963.

Gillian's will is held by the National Archive at Kew.

== Family ==
He was married on 22 August 1832 in Batavia to Catherine Cornelia van Beusechem, of Dutch origin.

She died with her two children, two sisters and mother in the same shipwreck which claimed her husband's life.
