= Robert Gavin =

Scottish painter (1827-1883)

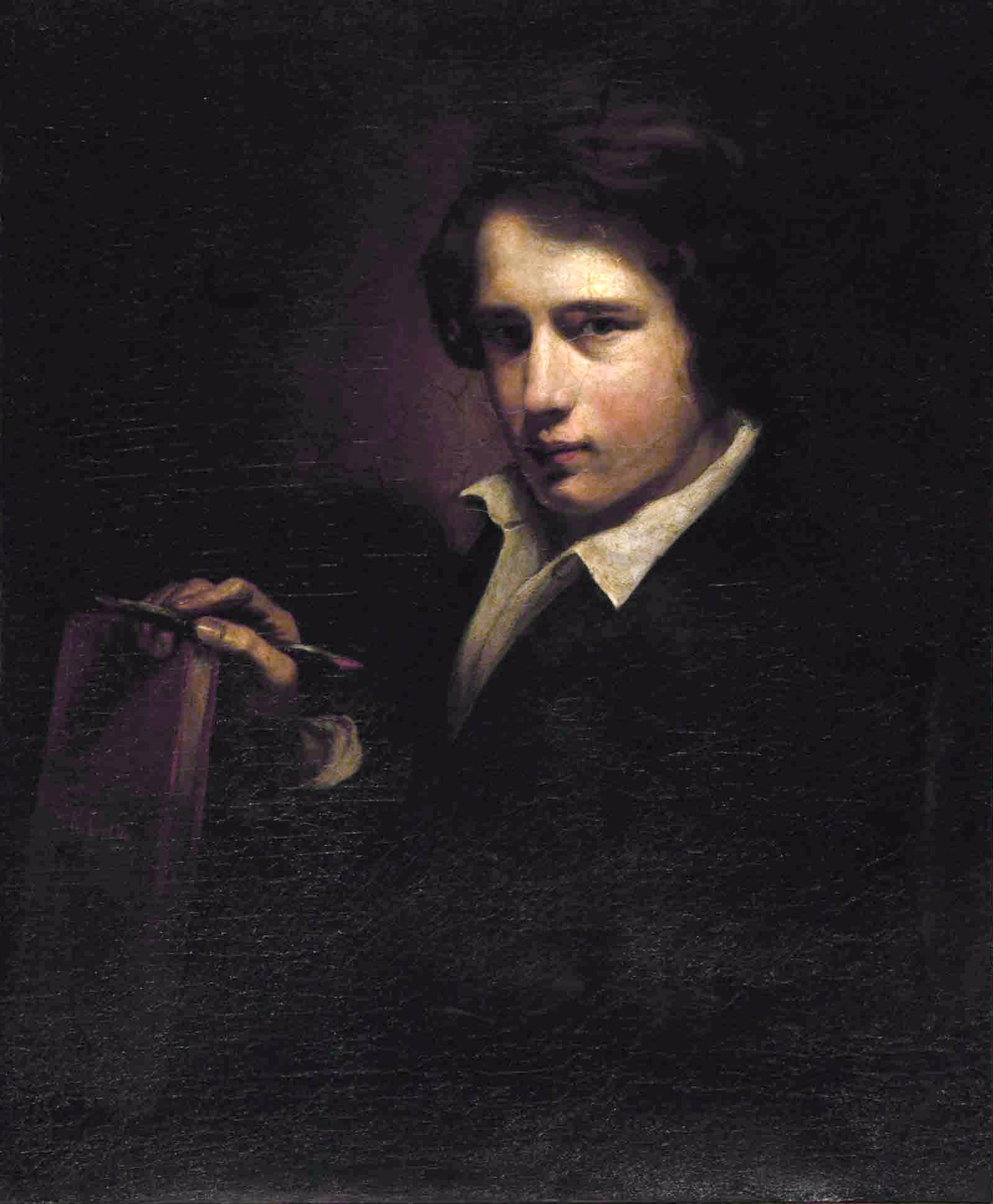
- Self portrait
- Born: 1827; Leith
- Died: 5 October 1883 (aged 55–56); Newhaven

Robert Gavin, R.S.A. (1827 – 5 October 1883) was a Scottish painter.

== Biography ==
Gavin was the second son of Peter Gavin, a merchant at Leith, where the painter was born in 1827. His father was a ship chandler with premises on Commercial Street opposite the Customs House and living at 1 Great Junction Street at the foot of Leith Walk.

He was educated at the Leith High School, and when about twenty-one years of age he entered the School of Design in Edinburgh, and studied under Thomas Duncan. From 1846 he lived with his parents in a larger house at James Place facing Leith Links. From 1853 he left the family home and rented rooms at 15 Gayfield Square at the top of Leith Walk.

Gavin painted a large number of familiar and rustic subjects, mainly landscape compositions with figures of children, which became very popular. Some of these, such as the Reaping Girl and Phœbe Mayflower, were reproduced in chromo-lithography. He was elected an associate of the Royal Scottish Academy in 1854. About three years later he appears to have become dissatisfied with his progress as an artist, and entered into partnership with a wine merchant; but after about a year he resumed the practice of his art. He was a regular contributor to the exhibitions of the Royal Scottish Academy, and between 1855 and 1871 exhibited a few pictures at the Royal Academy in London. In 1868 he made a tour in America, and painted several characteristic phases of negro life. Soon after his return home he went to Morocco, and resided for some years at Tangier, where he painted numerous Moorish pictures. In 1879 he became an academician, and presented as his diploma work The Moorish Maiden's First Love, a damsel caressing a beautiful white horse; this picture is now in the collections of the Royal Scottish Academy of Art & Architecture.

He returned to Scotland in 1880, and continued to paint subjects of Moorish life and manners until his death, which took place at his residence, Cherry Bank, Newhaven, near Edinburgh, on 5 Oct. 1883. He was buried in Warriston Cemetery.
