= Royce Cadman =

English rugby union player

- Born: Royce Cadman; 13 October 1987 (age 39) Canterbury, Kent, England
- Height: 2.01 m (6 ft 7 in)
- Weight: 108 kg (17 st 0 lb)
- University: Hartpury College
- Notable relative: Rex Cadman (father)

Rugby union career
- Position: Second Row
- Current team: Canterbury
Youth career
- Thanet Wanderers
Senior career
Years	Team	Apps	(Points)
2010–12,	Bedwas	48	(0)
2012–13	Dragons	3	(0)
–	Doncaster Knights	13	(0)
- Correct as of 10 Jan 2012
International career
Years	Team	Apps	(Points)
- England Students, England Counties

Royce Cadman (born 13 October 1987) is an English rugby union player. His position is lock forward.

Cadman signed a dual contract with the Newport Gwent Dragons regional team and Bedwas RFC in 2010 after finishing university at Hartpury College where he won 3 busa/bucs trophies, 3 EDF finals and achieved representing Gloucester A, Gloucestershire County (reaching the county final twice) and playing for England students.

Cadman made his debut for the Dragons in a pre season game against Cornish pirates in penzance in 2010 coming off the bench. Then starting, he made his first appearance in a domestic competition on 15 October 2011 against Bath Rugby.

He left Dragons to join Doncaster Knights for the 2012–2013 season.
