= John H. Oswald =

Scottish marine and landscape artist

John Hoy Oswald (1829–1899) was a 19th-century Scottish marine and landscape artist. He signed his work JH Oswald or JHO.

At baptism he was named John Oswald (However, subsequently he used the middle name "Hoy" which was intended to honour his paternal grandmother Elisabeth Hoy). Various transcription errors of handwritten scripts have led to him being recorded as John Hony, John Henry or John Hervey.

== Life ==
He was born in Limerick in Ireland in early 1829 (The Baptismal Record of the Presbyterian Congregation of Limerick). His father was a Scottish coachman, presumably working for an estate in the Limerick area at the time.

His parents returned to Edinburgh in Scotland in 1831. His early employment was as a coach painter (Scottish Census Records). He travelled around Europe in the late 1840s.

He lived for many years at 28 London Street, a large Georgian townhouse in Edinburgh's Second New Town. His brother's daughter was his housekeeper (Mary Oswald, his niece, also an artist).

He is buried in Warriston Cemetery.

== Works ==
He exhibited paintings at the Royal Scottish Academy, the Glasgow Institute, the Royal Academy, the Royal Hibernian Academy, the Royal Society of Oil Painters and other venues.

- Edinburgh from Burntisland

== Family ==
He was the uncle of John Hoy Oswald who was born in Edinburgh in 1875 and who emigrated to New South Wales and fought in the First World War.
