= John Clyde Oswald =

American author and magazine editor

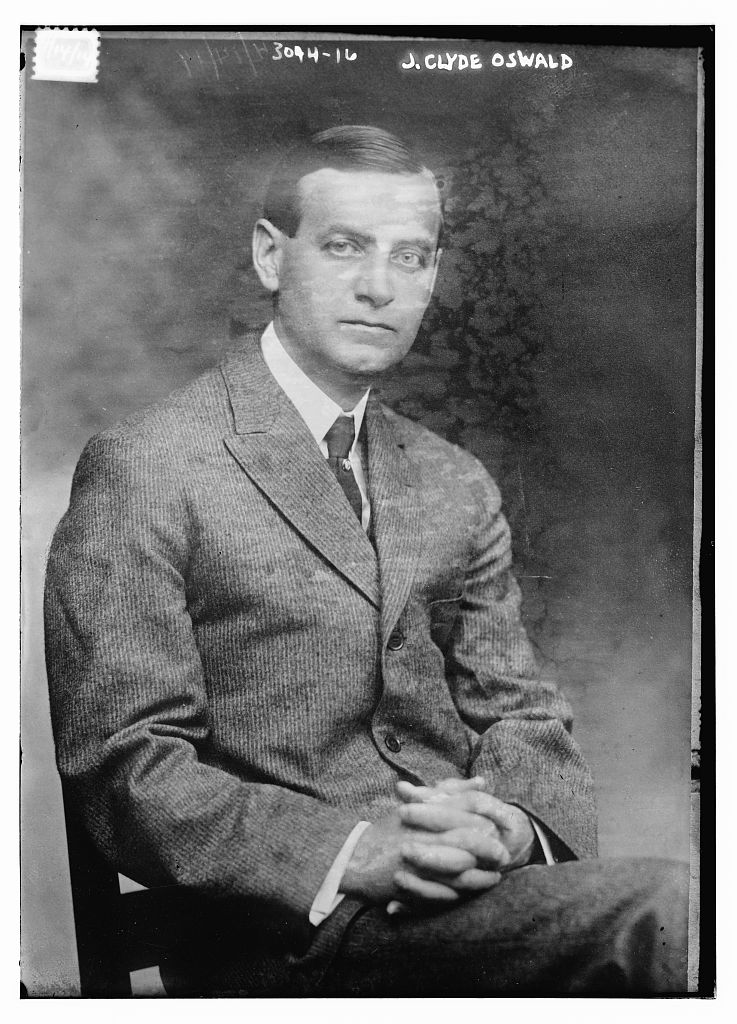
John Clyde Oswald (circa 1915)

John Clyde Oswald (July 11, 1872 – June 22, 1938) was an author, president of the National Arts Club, and the editor of The American Printer magazine. His book, Printing in the Americas, identifies the major events in each state "so as to suggest the distinctive character of the printers" is recognized as a primary source for research on early printing in the United States.

== Publications ==
- Benjamin Franklin, Printer (1917)
- Printing in the Americas (1937)
- Benjamin Franklin in Oil and Bronze
- A History of Printing
