= Horatio McCulloch =

Scottish landscape painter (1805–1867)

Horatio McCulloch RSA
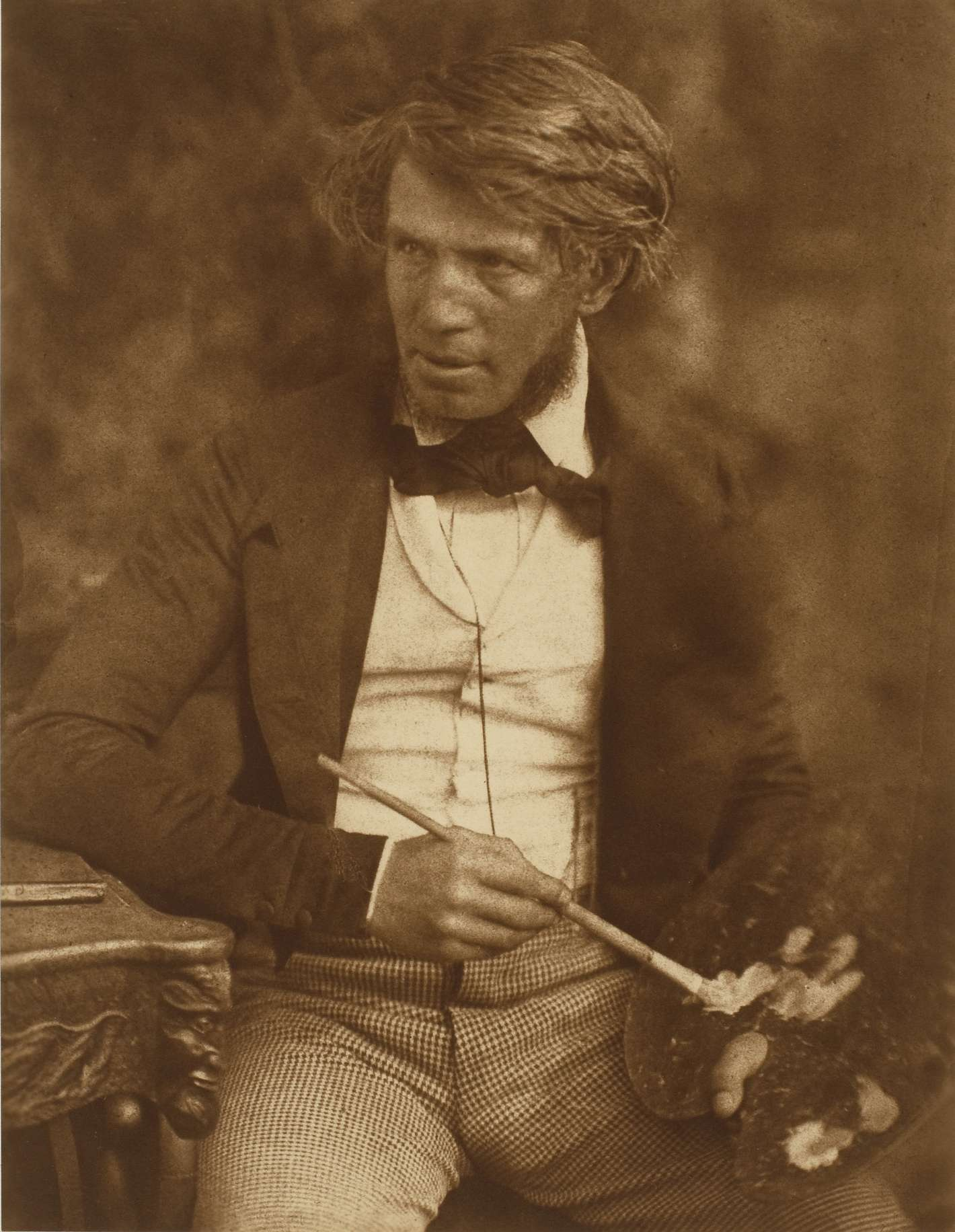
- Photographed by Hill & Adamson, 1847
- Born: November 1805; Glasgow, Scotland
- Died: 24 June 1867; Edinburgh, Scotland
- Education: John Knox; Daniel Macnee
- Known for: landscape painting

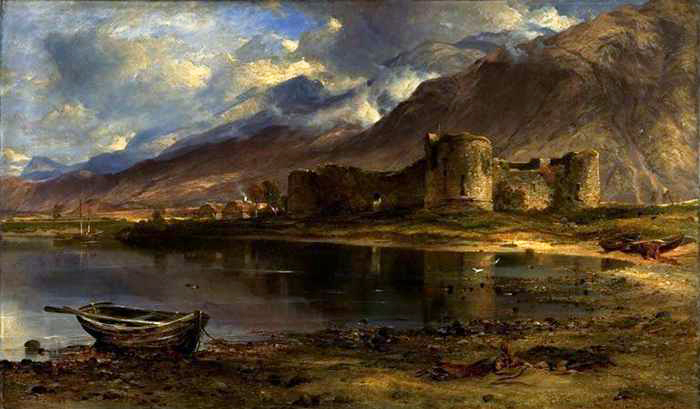
The ruins of Inverlochy Castle, painted by Horatio McCulloch in 1857

Horatio McCulloch RSA (9 November 1805 – 24 June 1867), sometimes written MacCulloch or M'Culloch, was a Scottish landscape painter.

== Life ==
McCulloch was born in Glasgow 9 November 1805 as the son of Alexander McCulloch, a cotton merchant, and his wife, Margaret Watson.

Horatio McCulloch was trained in the studio of the Glasgow landscape painter John Knox (1778–1845) for about one year alongside Daniel Macnee (1806–1882) and initially earned his living as a decorative painter. He was then engaged at Cumnock, painting the ornamental lids of snuffboxes, and afterwards employed in Edinburgh by William Home Lizars, the engraver, to colour the illustrations in Prideaux John Selby's British Birds and similar works.

After he moved to Edinburgh in 1825, he began painting in the tradition of Alexander Nasmyth. Working unweariedly from nature, he was greatly influenced in his early practice by the watercolours of H. W. Williams. He returned to Glasgow in 1827, and was employed on several large pictures for the decoration of a public hall in St. George's Place. He also worked as a theatrical scene-painter. About this time by the writings of Sir Walter Scott and the expressive landscape works of John Thomson, friend of Scott's and minister at Duddingston Kirk, Edinburgh. Gradually MacCulloch asserted his individuality, and formed his own style on a close study of nature; his works form an interesting link between the old world of Scottish landscape and the new.

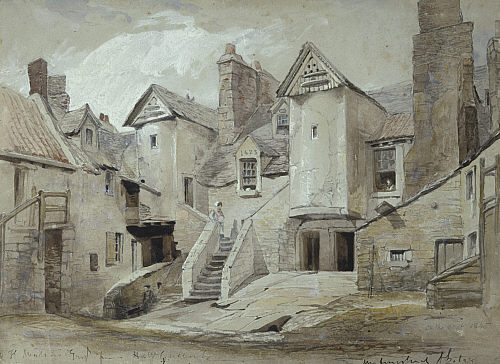
White Horse Close, Edinburgh, 1845, National Gallery of Scotland

In 1829 McCulloch first featured in the Royal Scottish Academy's exhibition (he was a regular exhibitor year by year afterwards). By the early 1830s, McCulloch’s exhibited with the Glasgow Dilettanti Society and with the Royal Scottish Academy had begun to attract buyers, notably the newly instituted Association for the Promotion of the Fine Arts in Scotland. A commission from Lord Provost James Lumsden helped establish the artist's reputation within Scotland. Commissions from book and print publishers allowed him to concentrate on easel painting.

On his election as full Academician of the Scottish Academy in 1838, McCulloch settled in Edinburgh and soon became a prominent figure in the artistic life of the capital and a prolific contributor to the Royal Scottish Academy exhibitions. At the same time, contact with Glasgow was maintained: McCulloch’s favourite sketching grounds were in the west, he exhibited regularly in the city, and his most loyal patrons were wealthy Glasgow industrialists such as David Hutcheson (1799–1880), the steamship owner. He seldom exhibited outside Scotland and only once at the Royal Academy, London (1843), but kept in touch with London artist–friends, John Phillip, David Roberts and John Wilson (1774–1855), through correspondence and visits. His own art collection was evidence of his admiration for 17th-century Dutch painters, for J. M. W. Turner and Richard Wilson and for contemporaries such as Clarkson Stanfield.

McCulloch did not settle until he married. His first appearance in any Edinburgh Street Directory is in 1840 living at 12 Howard Place in the Inverleith district. By 1841 he had left Edinburgh and was living at lodgings on Castle Street in Rothesay on the Isle of Bute.

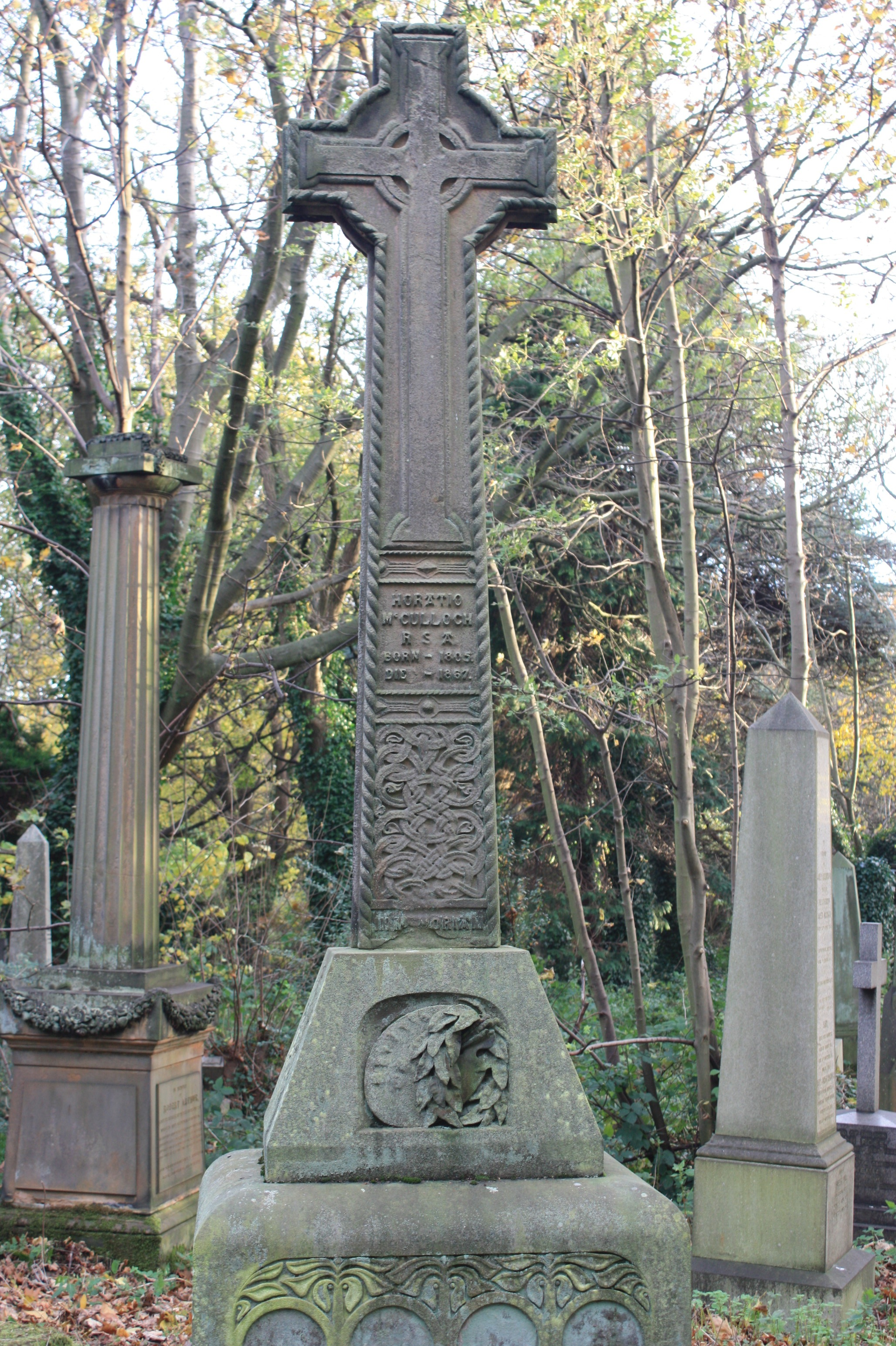
Horatio McCulloch's grave in Warriston Cemetery in Edinburgh

During one of his trips to Skye he met his future wife, Marcella McLellan of Gillean, near the township of Tarskavaig. It is known that he had several dogs of the Skye Terrier breed at his Edinburgh home and it is possible that he brought them from Skye with his wife.

McCulloch's pupils included John Smart R.S.A., now best known for his early etchings of golf courses in Scotland. Another was James Alfred Aitken.

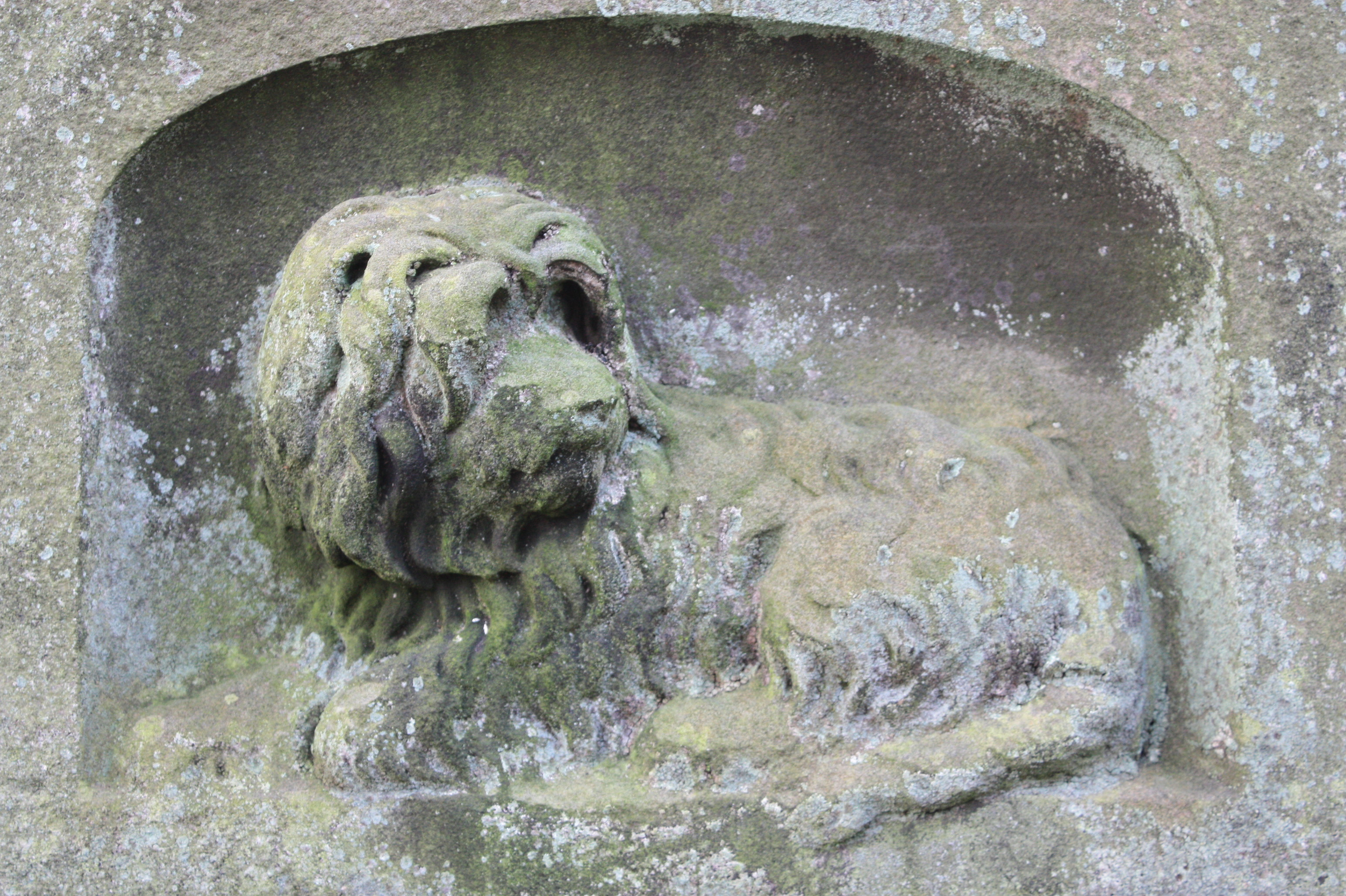
carving of a Skye Terrier on the back of Horatio McCulloch's grave

McCulloch died at "St Colme" in Trinity, Edinburgh on 24 June 1867. He is buried at Warriston Cemetery in Edinburgh. His monument was carved by the Edinburgh sculptor, David Watson Stevenson.

== Family ==
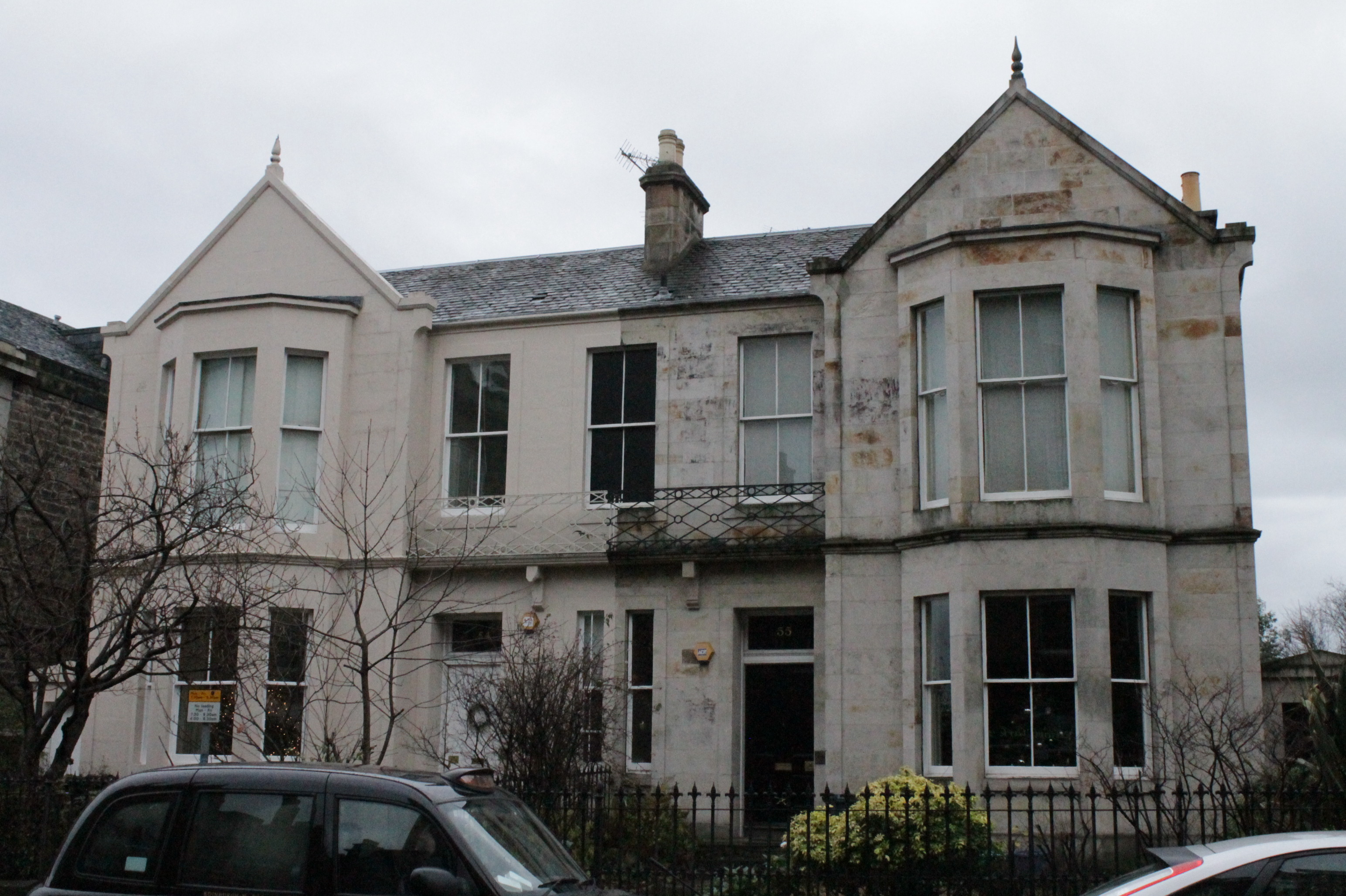
54 Inverleith Row, Edinburgh (left)

His widow Marcella McLellan, from Sleat on the Isle of Skye, left Scotland for Australia after his death, but died during the voyage. They had no children.

In their early life they lived at 54 Inverleith Row.

From around 1855 they lived at 7 Danube Street, in the Stockbridge area of Edinburgh. His artist friend, Kenneth Macleay, lived nearby at 16 Carlton Street.

== Works ==
During his lifetime Horatio McCulloch became the best-known and most successful landscape painter in Scotland. His constant aim was to paint the silence of the Highland wilderness where the wild deer roam with the kind of poetic truthfulness he admired in Wordsworth. The accomplished watercolours and broadly painted oil sketches that he produced throughout his career attracted little notice at the time and have remained comparatively unknown.

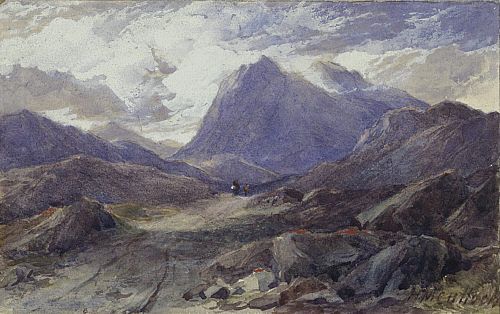
Glencoe, Argyllshire, 1864, National Gallery of Scotland.

His early works include paintings of Cadzow Forest near Hamilton and grand views of the Clyde. He undertook regular summer sketching tours of the West Highlands, completing the sketches as paintings back in his studio. These paintings aimed to celebrate the romantic scenery of the Highlands and evoke a magnificent sense of scale, emphasising the dramatic grandeur. Horatio McCulloch had, by his death in 1867, created the essential iconography of the Highlands.

From historical point of view, as the Scottish Lowlands became more urbanised, the distinctiveness of Scotland came to be represented through the Highlands. McCulloch's work was part of a process of distancing the relationship of people to land in the Highlands. In the Victorian period, the Highlands came to be defined as a wilderness instead of a populated space and many communities were cleared from the land in favour of large sheep farms and sporting interests. In essence, this romantic view of Scottish scenery was brought to a climax by Horatio McCulloch.

Several works by McCulloch were engraved by William Miller and William Forrest. A volume of photographs from his landscapes, with a biographical notice of the artist by Alexander Fraser, R.S.A., were published in Edinburgh in 1872.

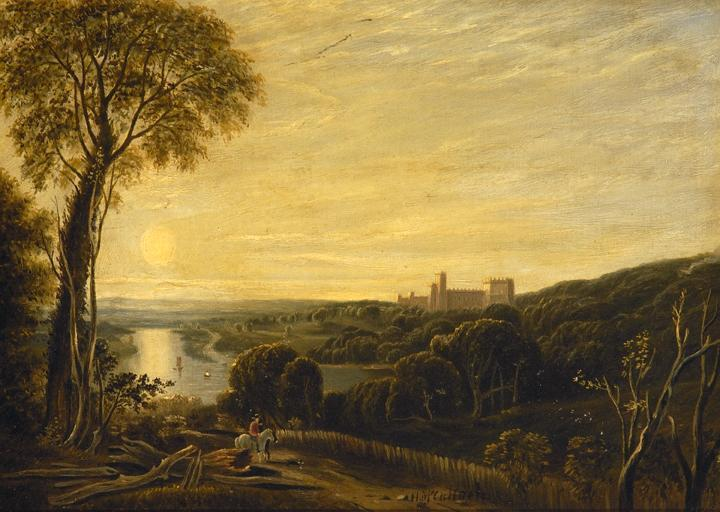
Evening View from the Bluff, Private Collection.

His best known works include:

- Inverlochy Castle (1857)
- Landscape Evening (c1860)
- Glencoe, Argyllshire (1864)
- Loch Katrine (1866)

== Sources ==
- Sheena Smith (1988). Horatio McCulloch 1805-1867. Glasgow Museums and Art Galleries. ISBN 0-902752-35-9
- Murdo MacDonald (2000). Scottish Art. Thames & Hudson, New York, NY, pp 104–106. ISBN 0-500-20333-4
- Alexander Fraser (1872). The Life and Works of Horatio McCulloch.
- John Morrison (2003). Painting the Nation: Identity and Nationalism in Scottish Painting, 1800-1920. Edinburgh University Press. ISBN 0-7486-1602-0
- David Irwin, Francina Irwin (1975). Scottish Painters: at Home and Abroad 1700-1900. Faber and Faber, London, pp 353–357 ISBN 0-571-08822-8
