= Colin Cadman =

Scottish botanist (1916–1971)

Colin Cadman FRSE
- Born: 16 July 1916; Glasgow
- Died: 27 September 1971 (aged 55); Edinburgh
- Scientific career
- Fields: Botany

Dr Colin Houghton Cadman FRSE (16 July 1916 – 27 September 1971) was a Scottish botanist who served as Director of the Scottish Horticultural Institute 1956 to 1971. He specialised in plant pathology, with a detailed knowledge relating to raspberries. He was also President of the Association of Applied Mycologists in 1971 and President of the Association of Applied Biologists from 1969 to 1970.

== Life ==
He was born in Glasgow on 16 July 1916. He studied at the University of Liverpool, and received a PhD from the University of Edinburgh in 1940.

He was elected a Fellow of the Royal Society of Edinburgh in 1950 one of his proposers being Sir William Wright Smith.

He lectured in the Department of Biological Sciences at the University of Dundee.

He died in Edinburgh on 27 September 1971 and is buried in Warriston Cemetery.

== Family ==
He was unmarried and had no children.

== Works ==
- Annals of Applied Biology (1971)
