= John Cadman =

John Cadman may refer to:

- John Cadman (convict) (1772–1848), transported to Australia in 1797
- John Cadman, 1st Baron Cadman (1877–1941), British mining engineer
- John Cadman (sportsman) (1934–2026), English cricketer and field hockey player
- Baron Cadman is a title in the Peerage of the United Kingdom
