= Dorothy A. Cadman =

English painter

- Dorothy Cadman self portrait
- Born: 1888; Twickenham, London, England
- Died: 1918 (aged 29–30); Willesden, London, England
- Known for: Painting

Dorothy A. Cadman (1888–1918) was an English painter, who predominantly worked in oil and watercolour.

== Life and work ==
Dorothy was born in 1888 in Twickenham, to William Westlake Cadman and Annie Sarah Boheme Cave. She studied painting and drawing at the prestigious Slade School of Art between 1907 and 1909, taking lessons from Henry Tonks. Her classmates and contemporaries at the Slade School during this period included Mark Gertler and Maxwell Gordon Lightfoot. Between 1914 and 1916 Dorothy exhibited six paintings at the London Salon of the Allied Artists' Association which were shown in the dramatic setting of the Royal Albert Hall. She died in 1918, in Willesden, London. A small retrospective exhibition of her work was held at the Fairhurst Gallery, London, in October 1987. Her work is much sought after and has been sold at major art auction houses including Christie's and Sotheby's in London.
