= Scott Monument =

Monument and landmark in Edinburgh

Coordinates: 55°57′8.7″N 3°11′35.8″W

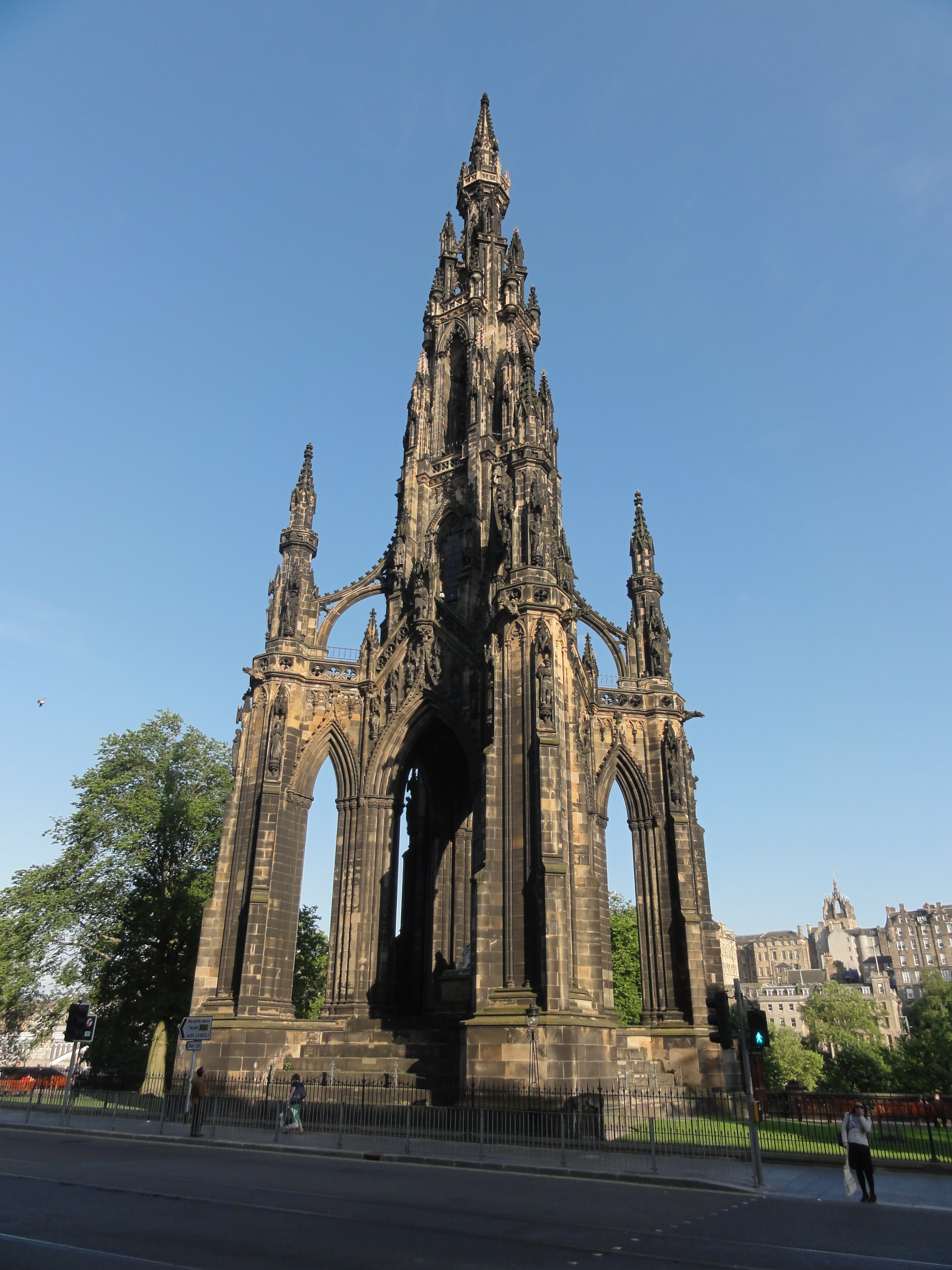
- Street view of the Scott Monument
- Interactive map of Scott Monument
- Location: Princes Street Gardens, Edinburgh, Scotland
- Designer: George Meikle Kemp
- Type: Victorian Gothic monument
- Height: 61.11 m (200.5 ft)
- Visitors: 80,975 (in 2018)
- Beginning date: 15 August 1840
- Opening date: 15 August 1846
- Dedicated to: Sir Walter Scott

The Scott Monument is a Victorian Gothic monument to Scottish author Sir Walter Scott. It is the second-largest monument to a writer in the world after the José Martí monument in Havana. It stands in Princes Street Gardens in Edinburgh, opposite the former Jenners building on Princes Street and near Edinburgh Waverley Railway Station, which is named after Scott's Waverley novels.

== Construction ==
=== Design and concept ===
The tower is 200 feet 6 inches (61.11 m) high and has viewing platforms reached by a series of spiral staircases giving panoramic views of central Edinburgh and its surroundings. The highest platform is reached by a total of 287 steps. It is built from Binny sandstone quarried near Ecclesmachan in West Lothian.

It is placed on axis with South St David Street, one of the two streets leading off St Andrew Square to Princes Street, and is a focal point within that vista, its scale being large enough to screen the Old Town behind. Its size and elevated position cause it to dominate the eastern section of the Princes Street Gardens.

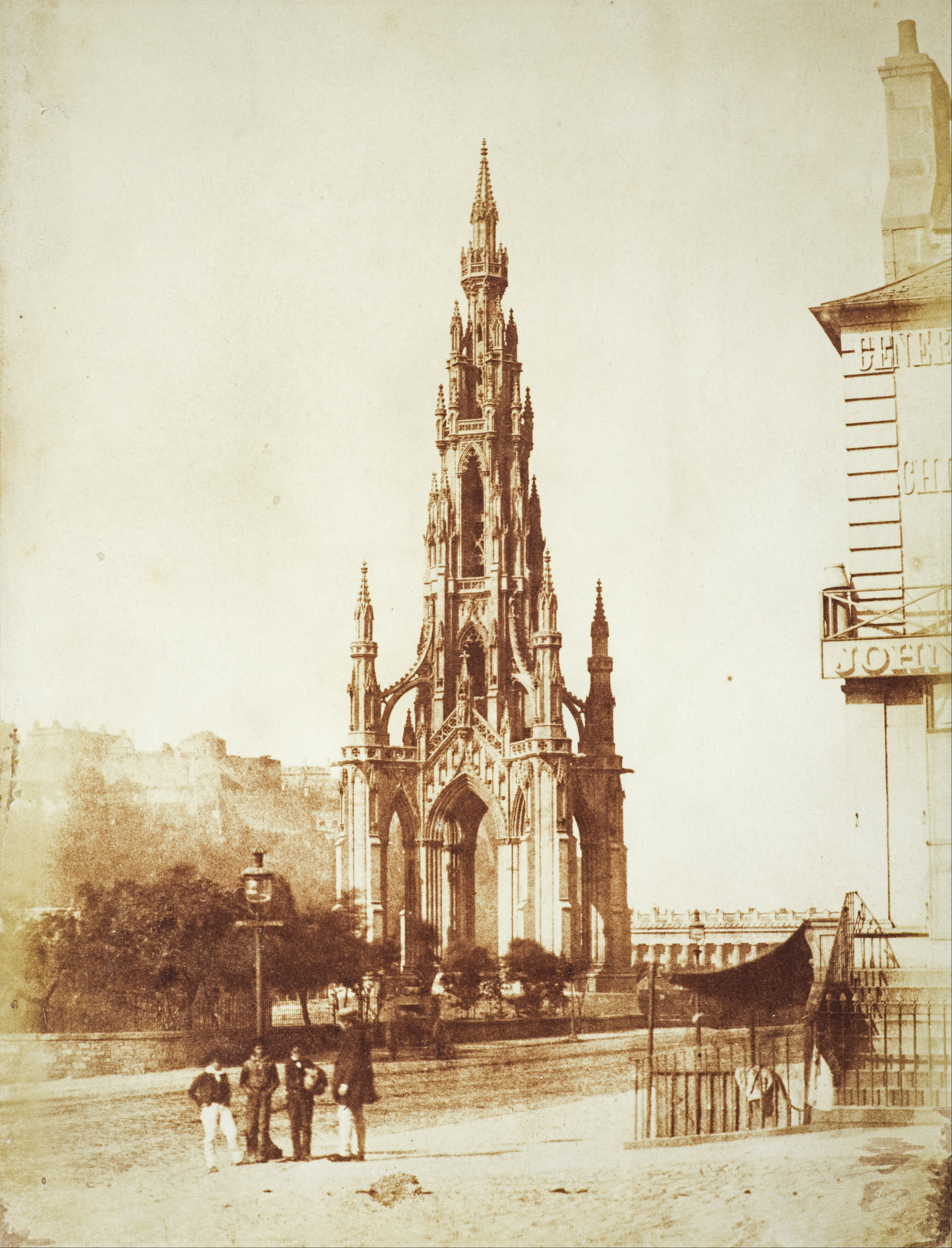
The Monument in 1845, shortly after its completion

=== Stonemasons ===
The erection of the Scott Monument came at a high cost to the stone masons involved, especially to the "hewing masons" who were responsible for preparing the blocks, with their carvings and statues. This work was done in closed sheds, where they were exposed to large quantities of dangerous fine dust. Things were not so bad for the "building masons" who worked in the open, placing the already prepared blocks of stone. Because of the hardness of the stone (from the Binnie quarry, near Uphall to the west of Edinburgh) used for the monument and other local buildings, Edinburgh masons were especially vulnerable to phthisis, the term used at the time for silicosis. One contemporary observer says that the monument "killed twenty three of the finest hewers in Edinburgh." Another mentions "one half of the whole number of masons employed" died of the lung disease.

=== Foundation stone ===
Monument to Sir Walter Scott Act 1841
- Act of Parliament
- Parliament of the United Kingdom
- Long title: An Act for the Erection at Edinburgh of a Monument to the late Sir Walter Scott.
- Citation: 4 & 5 Vict. c. 15
- Territorial extent: United Kingdom

Dates
- Royal assent: 18 May 1841
- Commencement: 18 May 1841 (Note: The Acts of Parliament (Commencement) Act 1793.)
- Repealed: 18 December 1958
Other legislation
| Repealed by | Edinburgh and Glasgow Railway Act 1844; Edinburgh Corporation Order Confirmation Act 1958 |

Status: Repealed

Text of statute as originally enacted

The foundation stone was laid on 15 August 1840 by Sir James Forrest of Comiston in his capacity as Lord Provost and as Grand Master Mason of Scotland. Construction began in 1841 following permission by Parliament's Monument to Sir Walter Scott Act 1841 (4 & 5 Vict. c. 15) and ran for nearly four years. It was completed in the autumn of 1844, with Kemp's son placing the finial in August of the year. The total cost was just over £16,154. The monument was inaugurated on 15 August 1846, but George Meikle Kemp was absent. He had fallen into the Union Canal while walking home from the site and drowned on the foggy evening of 6 March 1844.

== History ==
Following Scott's death in 1832, a competition was held to design a monument to him. An unlikely entrant went under the pseudonym "John Morvo", the name of the mediaeval architect of Melrose Abbey. Morvo was in fact George Meikle Kemp, a 45 year-old joiner, draughtsman, and self-taught architect. He had feared that his lack of architectural qualifications and reputation would disqualify him, but his design was popular with the competition's judges, and they awarded him the contract to construct the monument in 1838.

John Steell was commissioned to design a monumental statue of Scott to rest in the centre space within the tower's four columns. It is made from white Carrara marble and shows Scott seated, resting from writing one of his works with a quill pen, his dog Maida by his side. The monument carries 64 figures of characters from Scott's novels, sculpted by Scots sculptors including Alexander Handyside Ritchie, John Rhind, William Birnie Rhind, William Brodie, William Grant Stevenson, David Watson Stevenson, John Hutchison, George Anderson Lawson, Thomas Stuart Burnett, William Shirreffs, Andrew Currie, George Clark Stanton, Peter Slater, Amelia Robertson Hill (who also made the statue of David Livingstone immediately east of the monument), and the otherwise unknown Katherine Anne Fraser Tytler.

=== Modern administration ===
In the early 1990s it was proposed that the stonework should be cleaned. There were views for and against cleaning and a scientific/geological investigation, including cleaning trials on samples of stone, was carried out. It was decided not to clean the stone due to the damage it would sustain. A restoration programme was undertaken involving replacing old repairs and damaged areas with Binny stone for which purpose the original quarry was re-opened. The fresh stonework contrasts with the smoke-darkened original.

The overall cost of the restoration was £2.36 million and was funded by the Heritage Lottery Fund, Historic Scotland and the City of Edinburgh Council.

The monument is now administered by the Culture and Sport division of the City of Edinburgh Council who in 2016 installed a new LED lighting system. The design of the lights was "intended to highlight the monument's architectural features with a soft warm glow" and were first illuminated on 21 September 2016.

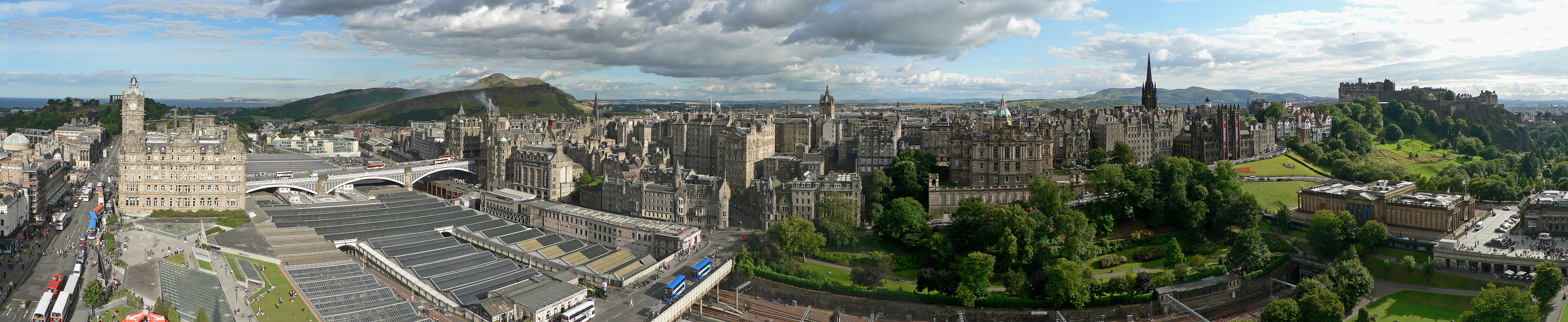
A panorama of Edinburgh, seen from the Scott Monument

== 180th Anniversary celebration ==
Summer 2026 has seen the 180th anniversary of the monument acknowledged, with free tickets for twelve people every day being made available from 10 to 17 August. The Herald quotes Councillor Margaret Graham of Edinburgh City Council as saying: "The Scott Monument is one of Edinburgh's most iconic landmarks and a much-loved part of our city's heritage. I'm delighted to be celebrating its 180th anniversary by giving more people the chance to experience the monument, whether that's climbing to enjoy its spectacular views or learning more about the life and legacy of Sir Walter Scott.

== In popular culture ==
The monument is featured prominently in the 2012 film Cloud Atlas, as a location which the character Robert Frobisher frequents. An imagined copy of the monument is featured in the 1899 painting by James Ford, Holiday Time in Cape Town, depicting a Victorian era imagined utopian future Cape Town.

== Statues and locations ==
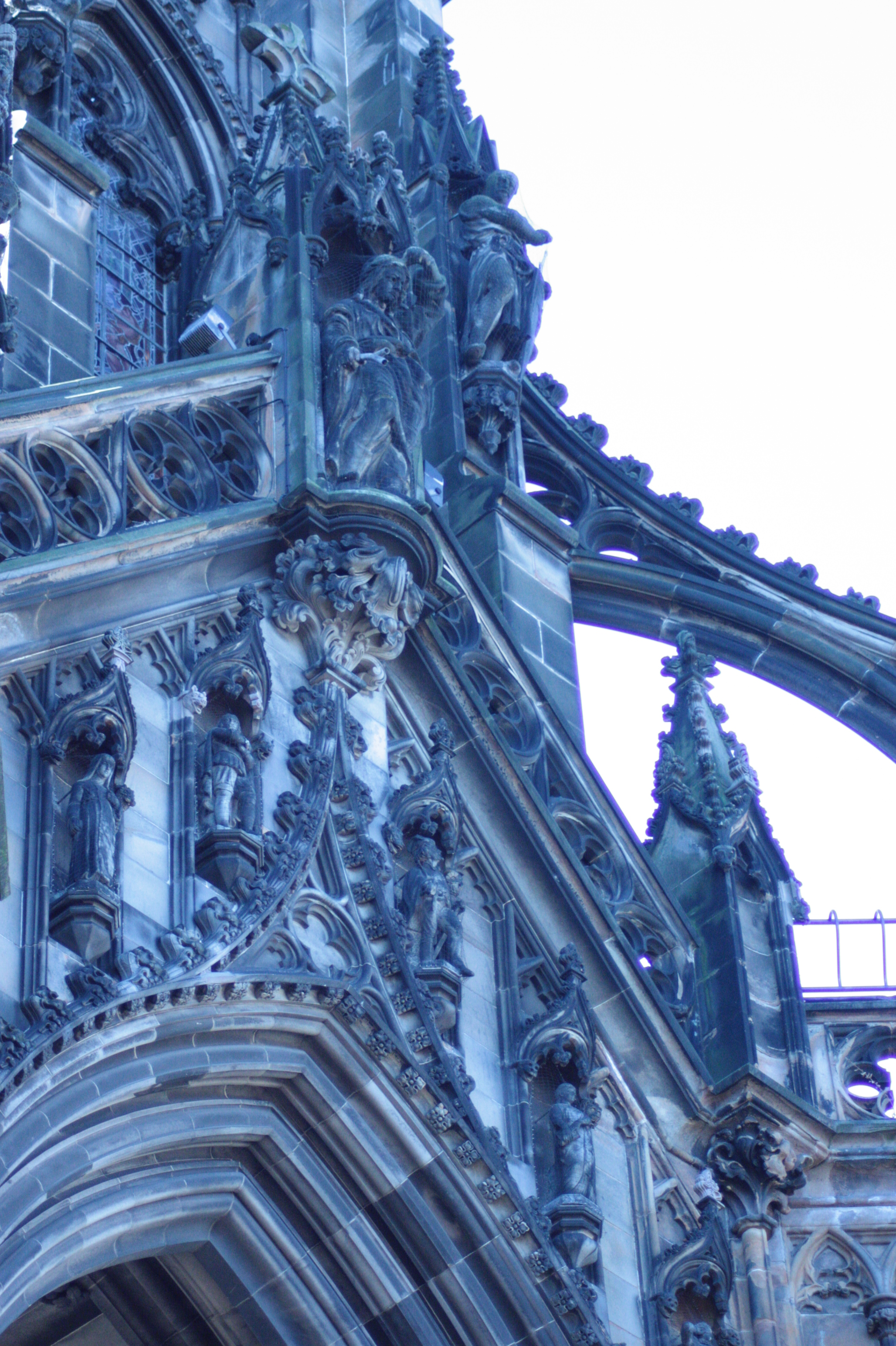
Detail of the Scott Monument

There are 68 statues on the monument, not counting Scott and his dog Maida, and 64 are visible from the ground. Four figures are placed above the final viewing gallery and are only visible by telephoto or from the viewing gallery (at a distorted angle). In addition, eight kneeling Druid figures support the final viewing gallery. There are 32 unfilled niches at higher level.

Sixteen heads of Scottish poets and writers appear on the lower faces, at the top of the lower pilasters. The heads represent, counter-clockwise from the northwest: James Hogg, Robert Burns, Robert Fergusson, Allan Ramsay, George Buchanan, Sir David Lindsay, Robert Tannahill, Lord Byron, Tobias Smollett, James Beattie, James Thomson, John Home, Mary, Queen of Scots, King James I of Scotland, King James V of Scotland, and William Drummond of Hawthornden.

(S) represents a small figure.

| Location | Figure | Scott Novel associated | Sculptor |
|---|---|---|---|
| North-East Buttress, lower tier, east | Jock Dumbie, the Laird o' Dumbiedykes | The Heart of Midlothian | William Brodie |
| North-East Buttress, lower tier, north-east | Jeanie Deans | The Heart of Midlothian | William Brodie |
| North-East Buttress, lower tier, north | Flora MacIvor | Waverley | John Hutchison |
| North Face, lower tier | Ravenswood (S) | The Bride of Lammermoor | John Rhind |
| North Face, lower tier | Lucy Ashton (S) | The Bride of Lammermoor | John Rhind |
| North Face, lower tier | Caleb Balderstone (S) | The Bride of Lammermoor | William Grant Stevenson |
| North Face, central figure over arch | Charles Edward Stewart (Bonnie Prince Charlie) | Waverley and Redgauntlet | Alexander Handyside Ritchie |
| North Face, lower tier | Madge Wildfire (S) | The Heart of Midlothian | William Brodie |
| North Face, lower tier | Davie Deans (S) | The Heart of Midlothian | Thomas Stuart Burnett |
| North Face, lower tier | Effie Deans (S) | The Heart of Midlothian | Thomas Stuart Burnett |
| North-West Buttress, lower tier, north | Louise, The Glee Maiden, playing a mandolin | The Fair Maid of Perth | John Hutchison |
| North-West Buttress, lower tier, north-west | Hal o' the Wynd | The Fair Maid of Perth | John Hutchison |
| North-West Buttress, lower tier, west | Edith of Lorn | The Lord of the Isles | William Brodie |
| West Face, lower tier | George Buchanan (S) | Buchanan is a true historical figure referenced in many Scott novels | John Rhind |
| West Face, lower tier | Julia Mannering (S) | Guy Mannering | George Webster |
| West Face, lower tier | Dirk Hatteraick (S) | Guy Mannering | William Birnie Rhind |
| West Face, central figure over arch | The Harp o' the North | The Lay of the Last Minstrel | James Ritchie |
| West Face, lower tier | Rose Bradwardine (S) | Waverley | D. Buchanan |
| West Face, lower tier | Dougal Cratur (S) | Rob Roy | Charles McBride |
| West Face, lower tier | Catharine Glover, The Fair Maid of Perth (S) | The Fair Maid of Perth | David Watson Stevenson |
| South-West Buttress, lower tier, west | Minna Troil | The Pirate | Amelia Robertson Hill |
| South-West Buttress, lower tier, south-west | George Heriot (holding a model of George Heriot's School) | The Fortunes of Nigel | Peter Slater |
| South-West Buttress, lower tier, south | Baillie Nicol Jarvie | Rob Roy | George Anderson Lawson |
| South Face, lower tier | Peter Peebles (S) | Redgauntlet | William Grant Stevenson |
| South Face, lower tier | Constance (S) | Marmion (poem) | Katherine Anne Fraser Tytler |
| South Face, lower tier | Wayland Smith (S) | Kenilworth | J.S. Gibson |
| South Face, central figure over arch | Ellen Douglas, The Lady of the Lake | The Lady of the Lake (poem) | Peter Slater |
| South Face, lower tier | Gurth the Swineherd, with a pig at his feet (S) | Ivanhoe | William Shirreffs |
| South Face, lower tier | Queen Elizabeth I (S), originally holding an orb and sceptre | Kenilworth | William Walker |
| South Face, lower tier | Claverhouse (S) | Old Mortality | William Birnie Rhind |
| South-East Buttress, lower tier, south | Rebecca | Ivanhoe | George Clark Stanton |
| South-East Buttress, lower tier, south-east | Diana Vernon | Rob Roy | George Anderson Lawson |
| South-East Buttress, lower tier, east | Mary, Queen of Scots | The Abbot | David Watson Stevenson |
| East Face, lower tier | Dugald Dalgetty (S) | A Legend of Montrose | John Rhind |
| East Face, lower tier | The Abbess (S) | Marmion (poem) | William Grant Stevenson |
| East Face, lower tier | James Graham, 1st Marquess of Montrose (S) | A Legend of Montrose | David Watson Stevenson |
| East Face, central figure over arch | Meg Merrilees, the gypsy (originally holding a green bough of copper, now missing) | Guy Mannering | Alexander Handyside Ritchie |
| East Face, lower tier | Richie Moniplies, a well-dressed servant (S) | The Fortunes of Nigel | John Rhind |
| East Face, lower tier | The Lady of Avenel (S) | The Monastery and The Abbot | Thomas Stuart Burnett |
| East Face, lower tier | Sir Piercie Shafton (S) | The Monastery | George Clark Stanton |
| North-East Buttress, upper tier east | Old Mortality (Robert Paterson) leaning on a walking stick | Old Mortality | Andrew Currie |
| North-East Buttress, upper tier, north-east | Robert the Bruce | The Lord of the Isles (poem) | George Anderson Lawson |
| North-East Buttress, upper tier, north | Edie Ochiltree | The Antiquary | George Anderson Lawson |
| North Face, upper tier, left of window | King Charles I | Mentioned in several Scott novels | David Watson Stevenson |
| North Face, upper tier, right of window | John Knox, holding an open Bible towards the street | Mentioned in several Scott novels | John Rhind |
| North-West Buttress, upper tier, north | Robert Dudley, 1st Earl of Leicester | Kenilworth | William Brodie |
| North-West Buttress, upper tier, north-west | Amy Robsart | Kenilworth | William Brodie |
| North-West Buttress, upper tier, west | Baron Bradwardine | Waverley | John Hutchison |
| West Face, upper tier, left of window | Helen MacGregor holding a sword and targe | Rob Roy | William Brodie |
| West Face, upper tier, right of window | Rob Roy MacGregor | Rob Roy | John Rhind |
| South-West Buttress, upper tier, west | Magnus Troil | The Pirate | Amelia Robertson Hill |
| South-West Buttress, upper tier, south-west | King James VI | The Fortunes of Nigel | David Watson Stevenson |
| South-West Buttress, upper tier, south | Halbert Glendinning | The Monastery and The Abbot | David Watson Stevenson |
| South Face, upper tier, left of window | Balfour of Burley | Old Mortality | William Birnie Rhind |
| South Face, upper tier, right of window | Oliver Cromwell | Woodstock | William Brodie |
| South-East Buttress, upper tier, south | Saladin | The Talisman | George Clark Stanton |
| South-East Buttress, upper tier, south-east | Friar Tuck | Ivanhoe | George Clark Stanton |
| South-East Buttress, upper tier, east | Richard the Lionheart | Ivanhoe, The Talisman and The Betrothed | Amelia Robertson Hill |
| East Face, upper tier, left of window | Ivanhoe, in chainmail and plumed helmet, visor dropped, holding a heavy lance | Ivanhoe | John Rhind |
| East Face, upper tier, right of window | Brian de Bois-Guilbert, Knight Templar | Ivanhoe | William Birnie Rhind |
| Head of North-East Buttress, attaching main spire | Wamba the Jester | Ivanhoe | unknown |
| Head of North-West Buttress, attaching main spire | Crusader | Tales of the Crusaders | unknown |
| Head of South-West Buttress, attaching main spire | The Abbot, holding a staff and rosary (nose missing) | The Abbot | unknown |
| Head of South-East Buttress, attaching main spire | Nun clasping a cross | Appear in several Scott novels | unknown |
| Pinnacle, above upper gallery, north | Meg Dods | St Ronan's Well | unknown |
| Pinnacle, above upper gallery, west | Dominie Sampson (fingers restored 1999) | Guy Mannering | unknown |
| Pinnacle, above upper gallery, south | Mause Headrigg | Old Mortality | unknown |
| Pinnacle, above upper gallery, east | Dandie Dinmont with his terrier at his feet | Guy Mannering | unknown |

== See also ==
- List of Category A listed buildings in Edinburgh
- List of tallest buildings and structures in Edinburgh
- Scott Monument, Glasgow, completed in 1837
