= George Heriot =

16th and 17th-century Scottish goldsmith and philanthropist (1563–1624)

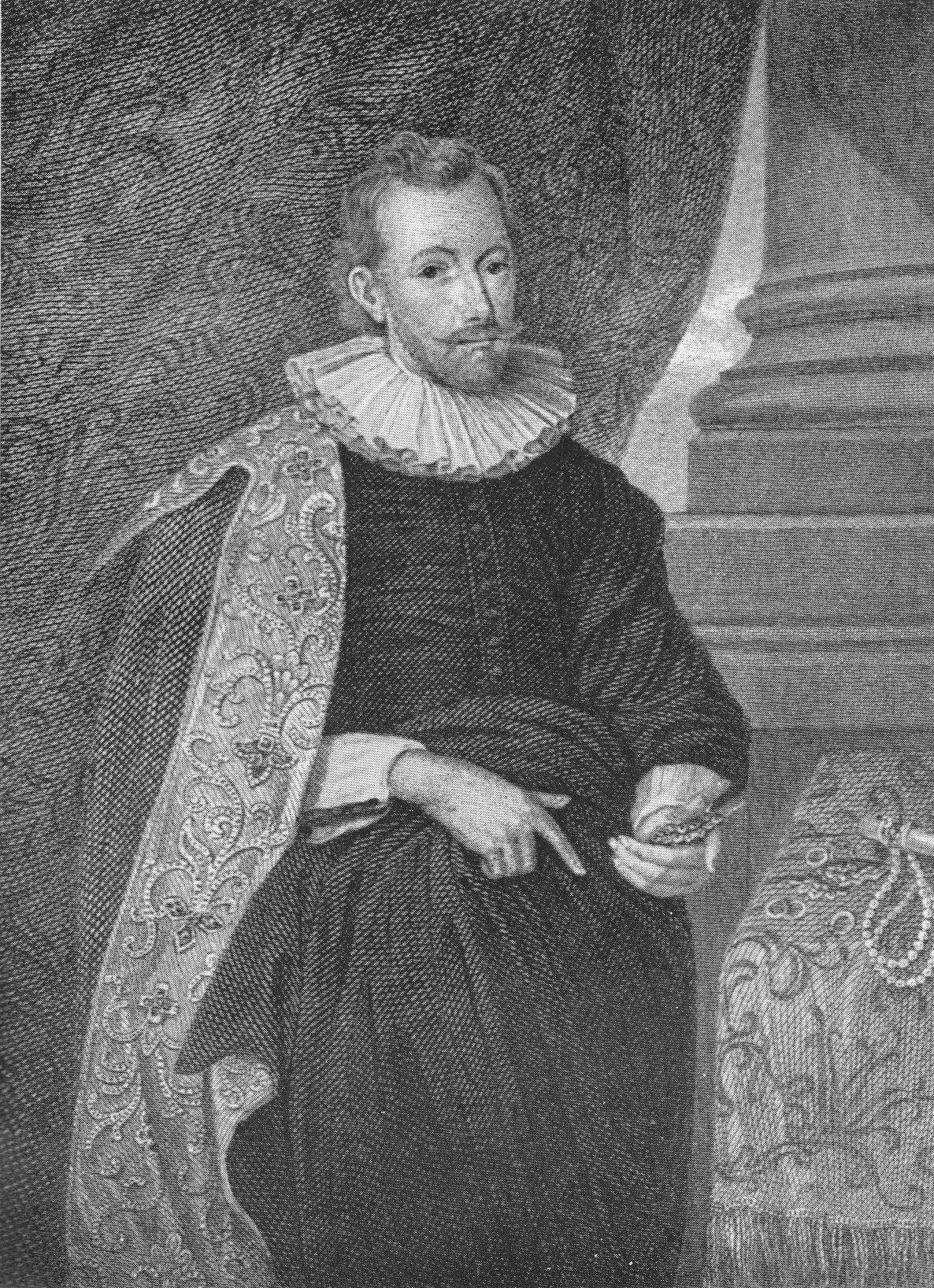
- George Heriot (1563–1624), founder of Heriot's Hospital
- Born: June 1563
- Died: February 1624 (aged 60)
- Occupation: Philanthropist

George Heriot (15 June 1563 – 12 February 1624) was a Scottish goldsmith and philanthropist. He is chiefly remembered today as the founder of George Heriot's School, an independent school in Edinburgh; his name has also been given to Heriot-Watt University, as well as several streets (and a pub, the Jinglin' Geordie, after his nickname) in the same city.

Heriot was the court goldsmith to Anne of Denmark, the wife of King James VI of Scotland, as well as to the king himself; he became very wealthy from this position, and wealthier still as a result of lending this money back to the king and the rest of his court. He moved to London along with the court in 1603, at the time of the Union of Crowns, and remained in London until he died in 1624. He married twice but had no recognised children surviving at the time of his death and he left the bulk of his estate to found a hospital to care for "faitherless bairns" (orphaned children) in his home city.

== Early life ==
Heriot was born in Gladsmuir, (East Lothian), on 15 June 1563, the eldest son of George Heriot and Elizabeth Balderstone, and one of ten children. His father was a well-established goldsmith from an old Haddingtonshire family, who served as a Member of the Parliament of Scotland.

On 14 January 1586 he was engaged to marry Christian Marjoribanks, the daughter of Simon Marjoribanks a burgess of the county of city of Edinburgh and a local merchant; the couple had two sons, who died in their youth. To mark the marriage, and the end of his apprenticeship, Heriot was given 1500 merks by his father to establish his own business, which he did in a small booth near St. Giles' Cathedral, on the site of the entrance of the Signet Library.

He was elected a burgess of the county of city of Edinburgh in January 1588, at the age of twenty-four, and in May that year was admitted to membership of the Edinburgh Incorporation of Goldsmiths. By October 1593, he had been elected Deacon of Goldsmiths.

Heriot owned a house on Fishmarket Close off the Royal Mile.

== Goldsmith to the Crown ==
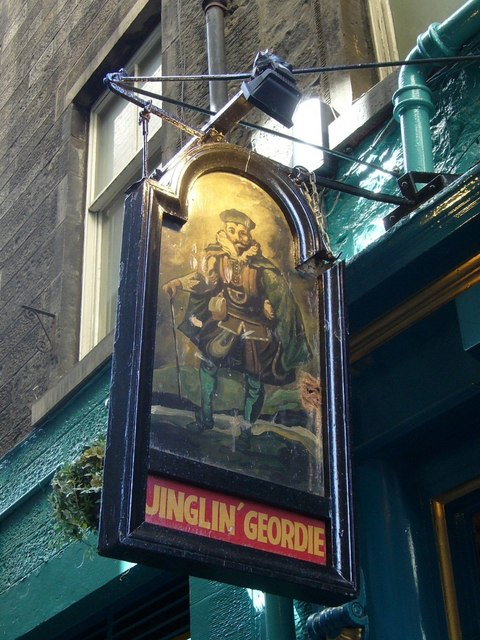
A pub in Edinburgh's Old Town preserves Heriot's nickname "Jinglin' Geordie" (from the sound of coins clinking in his purse).

From early in the 1590s, Heriot had been selling items to Anne of Denmark, the Queen Consort, and on 17 July 1597, he was officially appointed the goldsmith to the Queen. The queen had previously employed a German jeweller Jacob Kroger and a French goldsmith Elias Le Tellier.

The role of a goldsmith in the early modern period extended beyond simply the making and trading of jewellery and precious metals; in effect, he had now become her banker. Over the following years, he lent her significant amounts of money, often secured on jewellery he himself had sold her. Anne's love of jewellery was "legendary", and by the late 1590s both she and the king were taking out significant loans to support their spending. This ensured Heriot's position would remain lucrative; it had been estimated that between 1593 and 1603 he may have done as much as £50,000 of business with the Queen.

James VI owed Heriot £6,720 for jewelry and precious stones in March 1599 and gave him a jewel as a pledge for payment, which included 74 diamonds and a larger diamond set in gold. In June 1599 James instructed his exchequer officers to repay from his tax receipts a loan advanced on the security of some of the queen's jewels. In August 1599 Heriot was paid £400 Sterling from the English annuity, a sum of money which Queen Elizabeth sent to Scotland, for jewels delivered to Anna of Denmark.

Heriot's financial involvement with the court grew stronger over the years; he was appointed jeweller to James VI in 1601, and became involved in a government plan to replace the circulating currency of Scotland. By 1603, he held the right to farm the customs.

In 1603, at the Union of the Crowns James VI inherited the English and Irish thrones, and ruled these kingdoms as King James I. He moved to London. Heriot, along with much of his court, followed suit. In November he was appointed a jeweller to the king, with an annual salary of £150. The English goldsmiths John Spilman and William Herrick were given similar appointments. The salary was a small amount in comparison to Heriot's sales and loans, and by 1609 Queen Anne's debt to him was £18,000, from which he drew a sizeable interest.

Surviving bills for jewellery supplied to Anna of Denmark mostly date from 1605 to 1615, totalling around £40,000. Her servants Margaret Hartsyde and Dorothy Silking often dealt with him on her behalf. She often wore a miniature portrait of Isabella Clara Eugenia and Heriot mended its locket case twice. Heriot also supplied jewels to Prince Henry.

Surviving pieces made for Anne of Denmark which can be attributed to Heriot include a gold miniature case set with her initials in diamonds, now held by the Fitzwilliam Museum, which the queen may have gifted to her lady-in-waiting Anne Livingstone, a drawing in the Heriot papers matches the monograms on the case. A pair of earrings fashioned with the enamelled face of an African man, now in a private collection, corresponds with earrings itemised by Heriot in 1609 as "two pendants made as more's heads and all sett with diamonds price £70." They may reflect her fascination with the representation of African people in the theatre, as in her Masque of Blackness.

After his wife Christian Marjoribanks died, George Heriot returned to Edinburgh in 1609 to marry Alison Primrose, the daughter of James Primrose of Carington, the clerk to the Scottish Privy Council. The marriage was short-lived, as Alison died in 1612, and childless.

Heriot supplied a chain with 60 pieces each set with three small diamonds worth £250 to the king's favourite, the Earl of Somerset, which was returned to him in 1615 when the Earl was disgraced.

Heriot, with the other royal jewellers Abraham Harderet, William Herrick and John Spilman, joined the funeral procession of Anna of Denmark in 1619. Heriot swore an oath that he had delivered jewels worth £63,000 to the Queen which were not found among her possessions. He had kept the "models" or designs.

Heriot had a town house in the Strand and a country estate at Roehampton, and considerable property in Edinburgh.

== Death and legacy ==
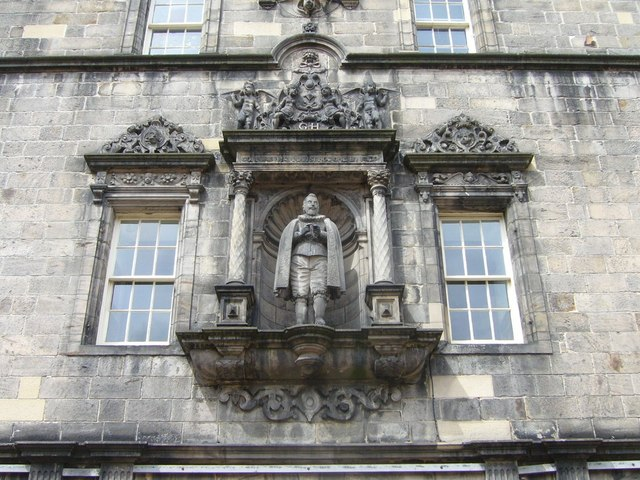
Statue of George Heriot in the quadrangle of the school he founded.

Heriot died in London in February 1624 and was buried at St. Martin-in-the-Fields, where the sermon was given by Walter Balcanquhall.

Heriot is believed to have had at least four children by his first wife, including two sons who may have been drowned at sea, although the exact details of their death are unknown. He had no other legitimate children – his second marriage was childless – but in his will left money to provide for two natural daughters Elizabeth Band (born 1613) then aged ten and Margaret Scott (born 1619) then aged four. There were additional bequests to his stepmother and his half-siblings, as well as his nieces and nephews. However, the residue of the estate, some £23,625, was left to the county of city of Edinburgh, to establish a hospital for the free education of the "puir, faitherless bairns" of deceased Edinburgh burgesses.

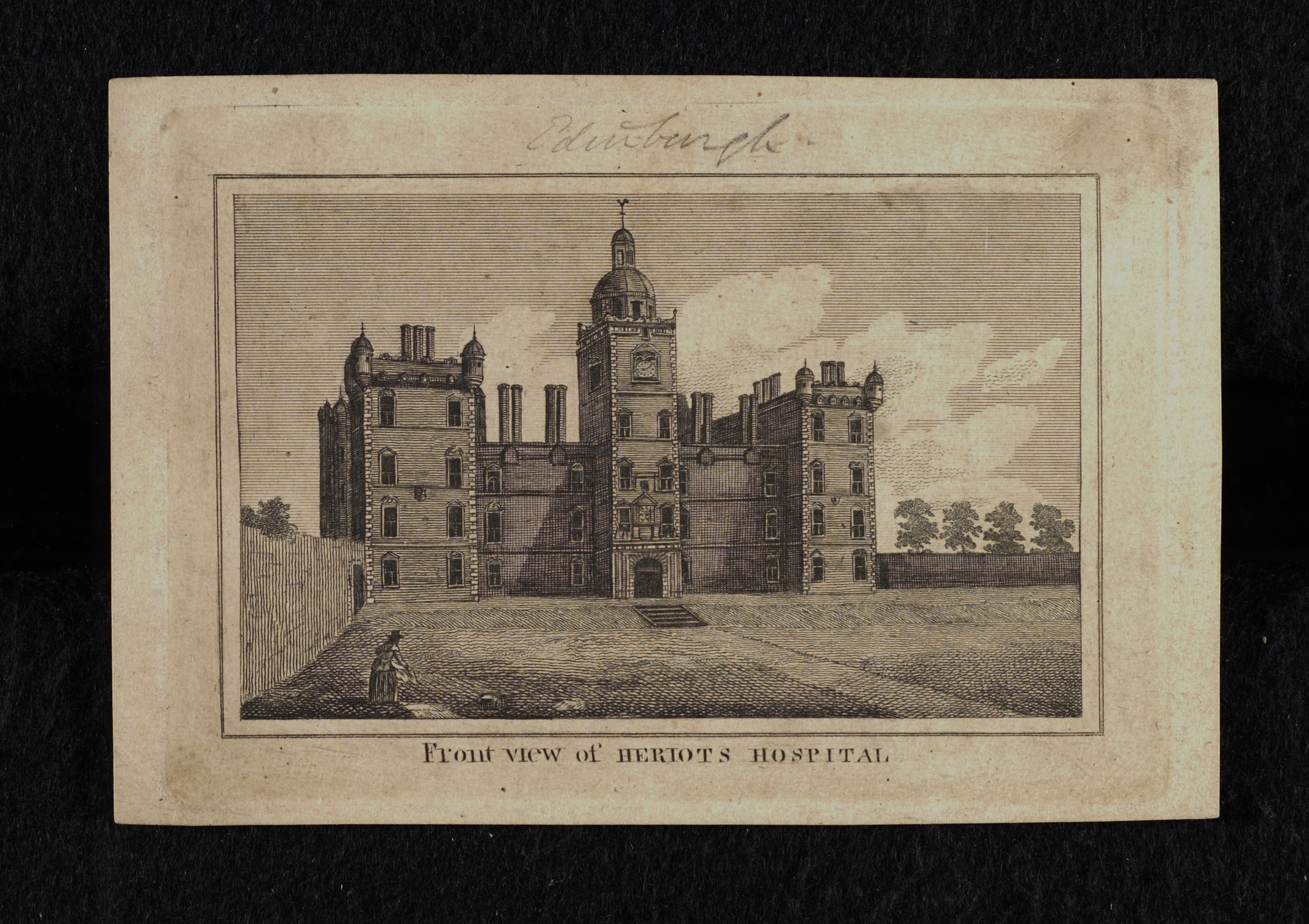
Front (north) view of Heriot's Hospital

Heriot's Hospital was begun in 1628, and duly constructed outside the city walls of Edinburgh, immediately to the south of Edinburgh Castle, adjacent to Greyfriars Kirk. It was completed just in time to be occupied by Oliver Cromwell's forces during the English Civil War. The hospital opened in due course in 1659, with thirty pupils; its finances grew, and it took in other pupils in addition to the orphans for whom it was intended. In the 1880s, it began to charge fees; however, to this day it serves its charitable object, providing free education to a sizeable number of children of widows or widowers.

== Memorials ==
A statue of Heriot stands within the quadrangle of the school, above the pend on the north entrance tower. This is by Robert Mylne the King's Master Mason. It bears a Latin inscription which translates as: "This statue shows my body, this building shows my soul".

George Heriot is one of the carved figures on the Scott Monument on Princes Street. His figure, which stands on the lower tier of the south-west buttress, was carved by Peter Slater. He is depicted holding a model of the school.

== In literature ==
George Heriot features as one of the two ghosts in Robert Fergusson's poem The Ghaists: A Kirk-Yard Ecologue (1773). He appears as a character in the novel The Fortunes of Nigel by Sir Walter Scott (1822). He is the protagonist in Jean Findlay's historical novel The Queen’s Lender (2022).

== See also ==
- William Fettes, an Edinburgh businessman, after whom Fettes College is named.
- List of universities named after people

== Sources ==
- Handley, Stuart (2008) [2004]. "Heriot, George (1523–1624)". Oxford Dictionary of National Biography (online ed.). Oxford University Press. doi:10.1093/ref:odnb/13078.
- Espinasse, Francis (1891). "Heriot, George". In Stephen, Leslie; Lee, Sidney (eds.). Dictionary of National Biography. Vol. 26. London: Smith, Elder & Co. pp. 244–246.

Note that the Oxford Dictionary of National Biography article is based on the original Dictionary of National Biography entry, but the two differ on several minor points. Where they conflict, the newer article is assumed to be accurate. The older article contains a number of details (e.g., a presumed death date for Heriot's first wife) omitted in the newer article; it is unclear if this is for reasons of space, or if those details were found inaccurate.

- Meikle, Maureen; Payne, Helen (2008) [2004]. "Anne (1574–1619)". Oxford Dictionary of National Biography (online ed.). Oxford University Press. doi:10.1093/ref:odnb/559. (Subscription, Wikipedia Library access or UK public library membership required.)
- Lockhart, Brian R.W. (2004). Jinglin'Geordie's Legacy: A History of George Heriot's School. Edinburgh: Tuckwell Press. ISBN 978-1-86232-257-8.
- Steven (D.D.), William (1872). History of George Heriot's Hospital. Bell & Bradfute.
