= Peter Slater (sculptor) =

Scottish sculptor and portrait artist

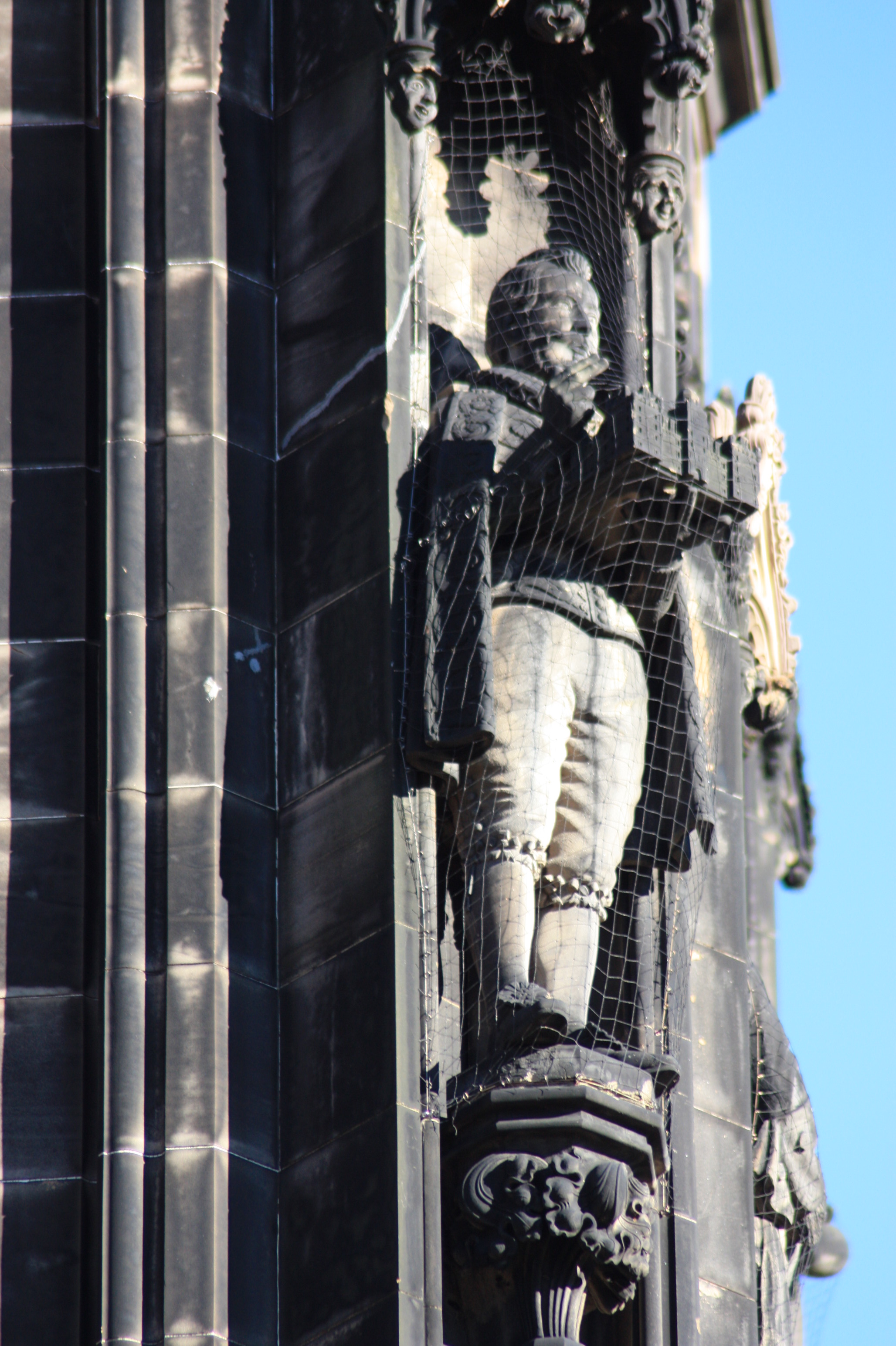
George Heriot as sculpted by Peter Slater, Scott Monument, Edinburgh

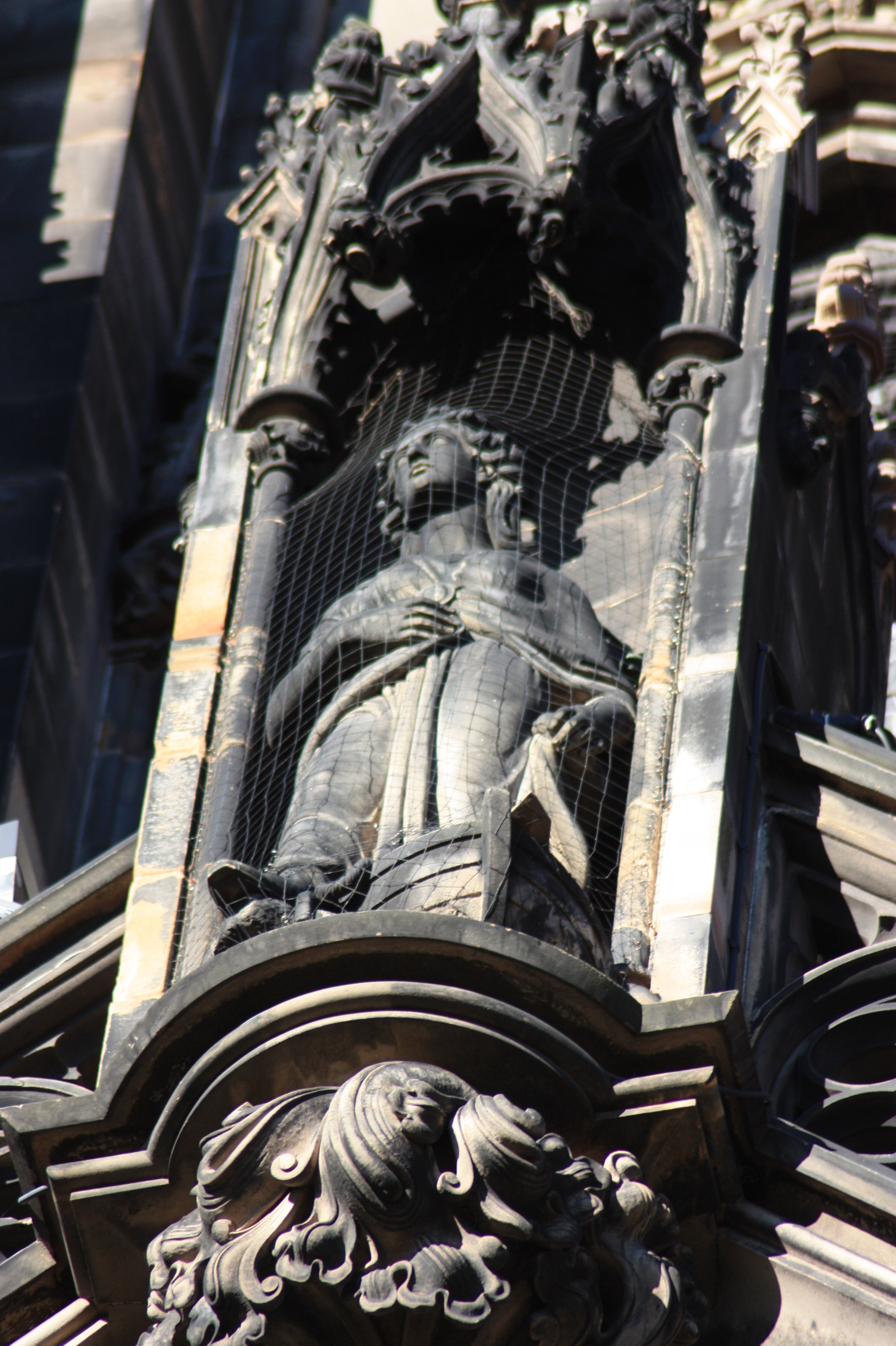
Lady of the Lake, Scott Monument, Edinburgh

Peter Slater RA (1809–1860) was a 19th-century Scottish sculptor and portrait artist. His name sometimes appears as J. P. Slater.

== Life ==
He was born in Edinburgh the son of John Slater (d.1816), marble-cutter on Picardy Place at the top of Leith Walk.

He entered the Edinburgh sculpture studio of Samuel Joseph in 1823 as an apprentice. In 1829 he moved with Joseph to London where he stayed for four years, being admitted into the Royal Academy in 1831, apparently on the recommendation of Wilkie Collins. In 1833 he returned to Edinburgh, largely living in the eastern New Town. He exhibited in both the Royal Academy (1846–1870) and Royal Scottish Academy (1833–1865).

His most noteworthy works are the figures of George Heriot (depicted holding a model of George Heriot’s School) and The Lady of the Lake, both on the Scott Monument in Princes Street.

He returned to live in London in 1860.

== Known works ==
- Bust of Sir James Forrest, Lord Provost of Edinburgh, New College, Edinburgh (1843)
- Bust of Prof George Dunbar, Old College, University of Edinburgh (1851)
- Bust of Prof James Pillans, Old College, University of Edinburgh (1852)
- Portrait of Robert Slater (believed to be his brother), exhibited at the Royal Academy (1859)
- Statue of James Watt (based on the statue by Francis Chantrey), first on Adam Square, Edinburgh, moved to the front of Heriot-Watt University on Chambers Street and moved again to sit on campus at Heriot-Watt University west of the city.
- Monument to Dr Carson, St Giles Cathedral
- Figures of George Heriot (south-west buttress) and "The Lady of the Lake" (central figure on south side) on the Scott Monument, Edinburgh
