= Thomas Stuart Burnett =

Scottish sculptor

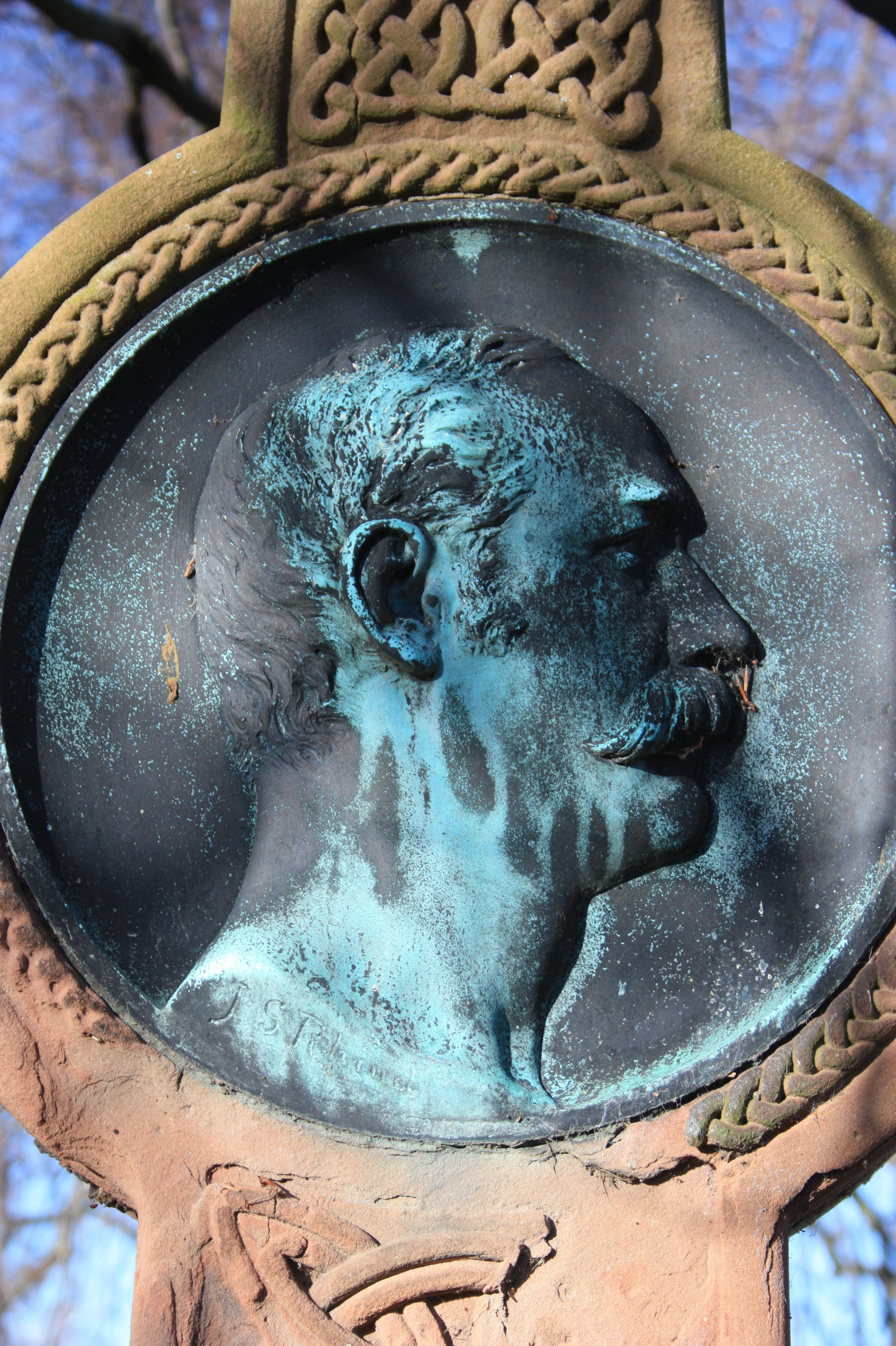
Thomas Stuart Burnett, plaque on grave by John S. Rhind

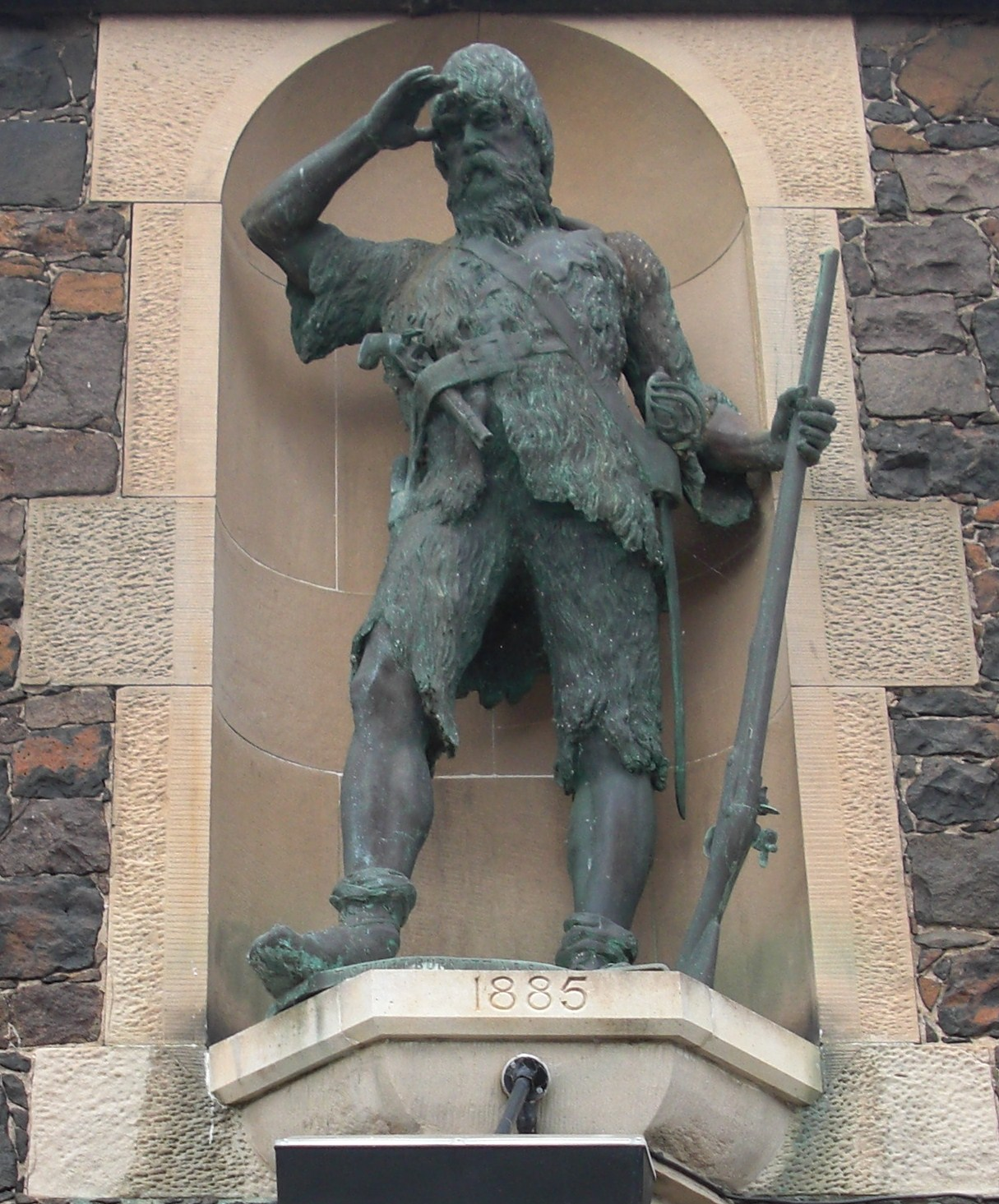
Statue of Robinson Crusoe in Lower Largo by Thomas Stuart Burnett

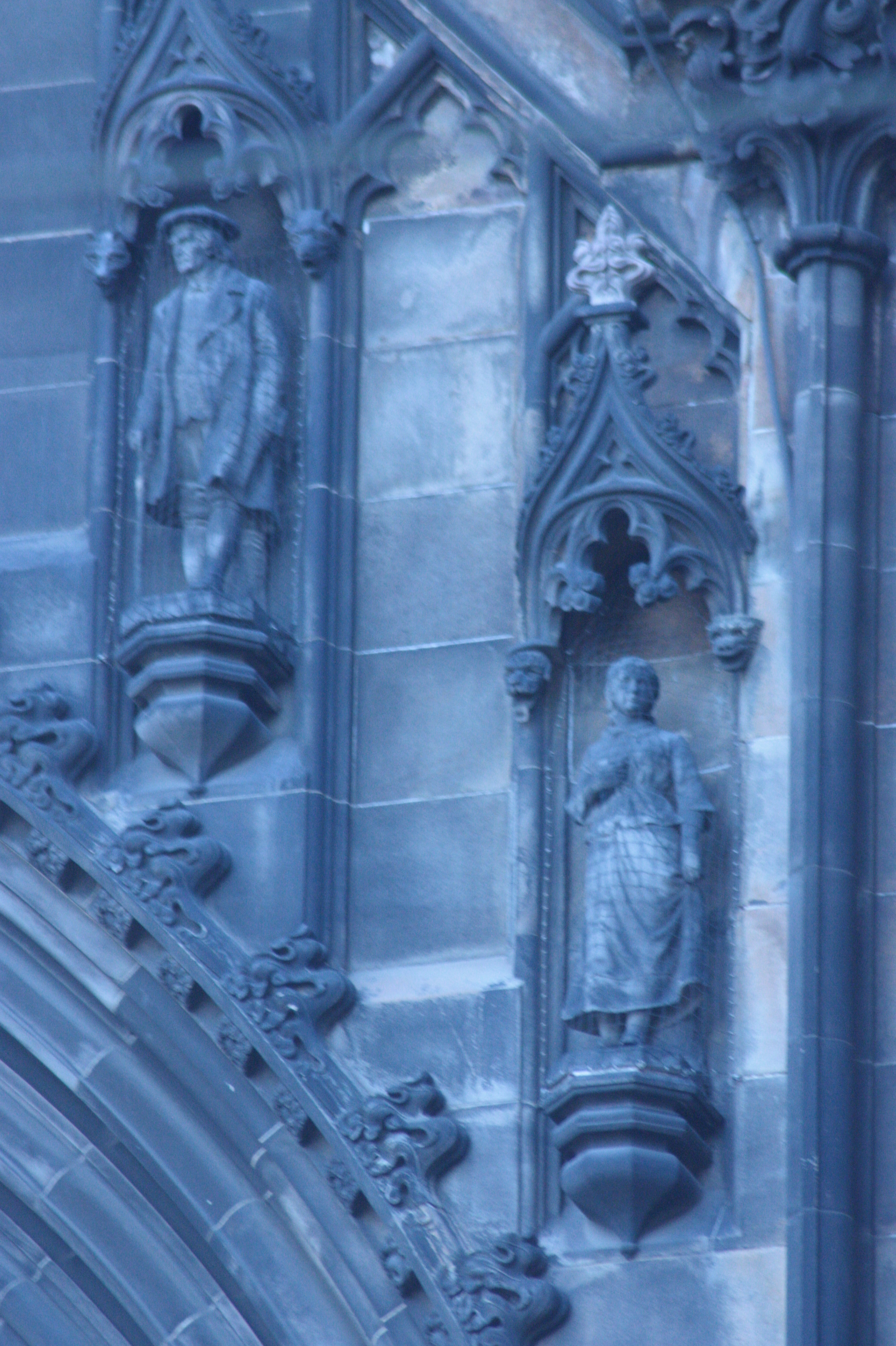
Davie Deans and Effie Deans as found on the Scott Monument, sculpted by Thomas Stuart Burnett

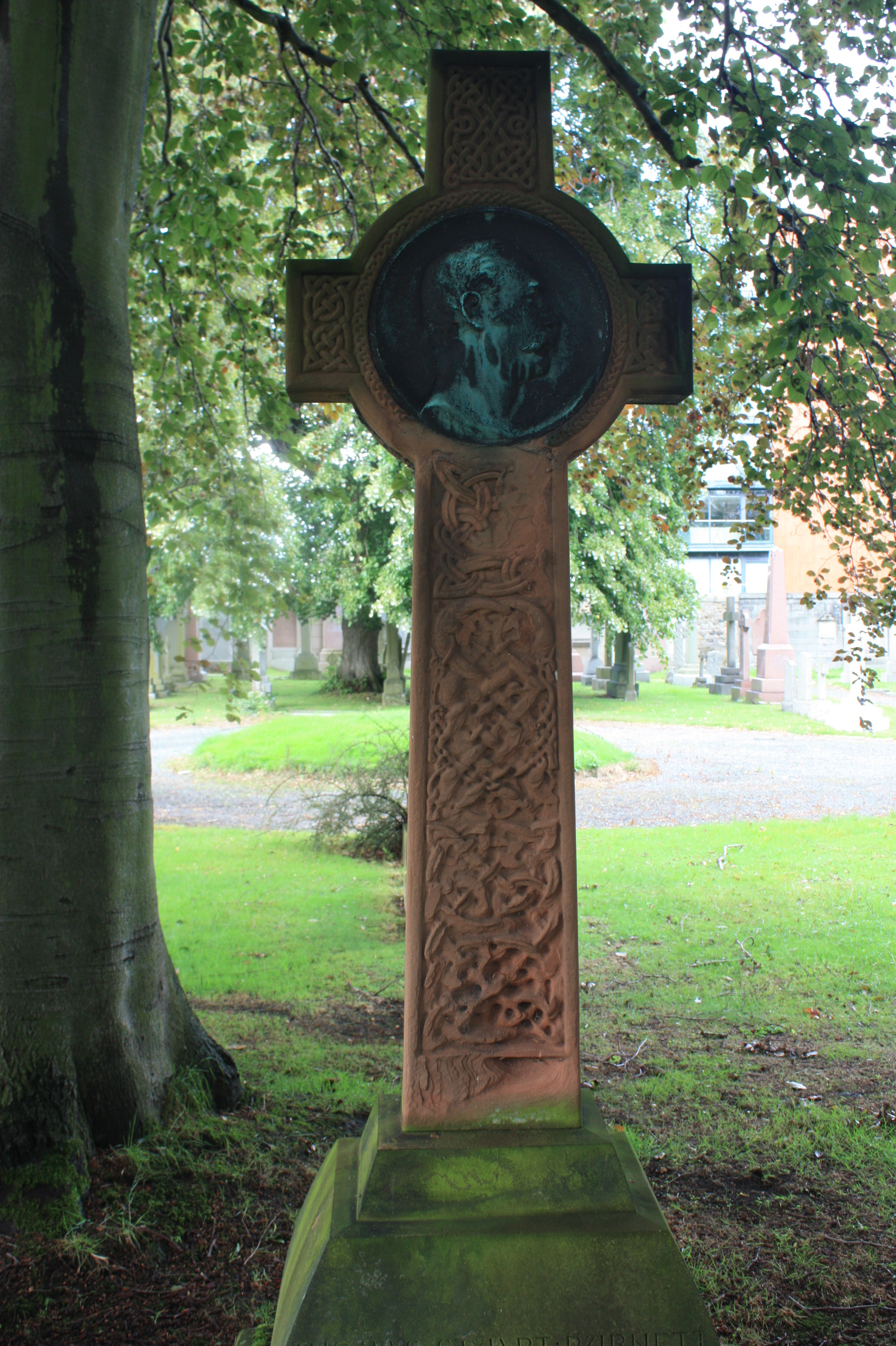
The grave of Thomas Stuart Burnett, Dean Cemetery, Edinburgh

Thomas Stuart Burnett ARSA (4 July 1853 – 8 March 1888) was a Scottish sculptor in the 19th century.

His two principal claims to fame is as one of the chosen sculptors of the figures depicting characters from the novels of Sir Walter Scott on the Scott Monument on Princes Street in Edinburgh and for the famous sculpture of Robinson Crusoe at Alexander Selkirk’s birthplace of Lower Largo in Fife.

== Life ==
He was born in Edinburgh, the son of James Burnett, a lithographic printer and Japanner living at 34 Toddrick's Wynd on the Royal Mile.

He studied under William Brodie and at the School Board of the Trustees on Picardy Place (run by the trustees of the Royal Scottish Academy). There he won their gold medal for the year in 1875. In 1876 he entered the RSA Life School, focussing upon the human form and won the Stuart Prize in 1880.

In 1881 he is recorded as living with William Geddes at Gowan Brae Cottage, Perth Street, Perth.

He was elected an Associate of the Royal Scottish Academy in 1883.

He died in Edinburgh in 1888 (several newspapers gave the cause of death as 'congestion of the lungs') and is buried in the north section of the original Dean Cemetery, towards the western end, with his wife Margaret Irving. The red sandstone celtic cross is eroding but has a fine profile head of Burnett, sculpted by John Stevenson Rhind.

== Works ==
- Low-relief bronze panels on the base of the statue to the Duke of Buccleuch on the edge of Parliament Square, the first statue on the Royal Mile.
- Statue of Rob Roy (1885), Scottish National Portrait Gallery
- Statue of General Gordon, Scottish National Portrait Gallery
- Statues of Davie Deans and Effie Deans (from the novel "The Heart of Midlothian") on the Scott Monument both on the north side, facing Princes Street.
- Mr David Raiker (1874)
- Mr and Mrs Andrew Dougal (1876)
- Ebenezer H. Murray (1878)
- William Hannah (1879)
- James Wilson (1879)
- John Blair (1879)
- Norman M. Henderson (1880)
- Rip Van Winkle (1880)
- William Grubb of Dundee (1881)
- The late Thomas Sprot WS (1881)
- Eugene Aram (1881)
- Mrs Denovan Adam (1883)
- David Pryde LLD (1884)
- Edmund Edmunds (1884)
- Thomas Mansfield Guthrie (1885)
- Arthur Edmunds (1885)
- William Forrest HRSA (1885)
- The late Rev Davidson (1885)
- Thomas Carlyle (1885)
- The late David Jack JP (1886)
- Robinson Crusoe (1886) (sited on a building in Lower Largo)
- HRH Albert Victor (1886 and 1887)
- W. E. Gladstone PM (1886 and 1887)
- The late Robert Riddle Stodart (1887)
- Monument to Robert Bryson in Warriston Cemetery (1887)
- John Reid (1888)
- James Irving (1888)
- Edmund Burton, engraver (1888)
- Robert Burns (1888)
