= Malagrowther =

Sir Mungo Malagrowther is a fictional character in Walter Scott's 1822 The Fortunes of Nigel. He is a courtier soured by misfortune, and who would have everyone be as discontented as himself.

In 1826 Scott wrote the Letters of Malachi Malagrowther to attack British government proposals to reform the issue of banknotes by private banks, adopting the transparent persona of a purported descendant of Sir Mungo. His campaign led to Scottish banks continuing to print their own banknotes.
