= David Watson Stevenson =

Scottish sculptor (1842–1904)

David Watson Stephenson (25 March 1842 – 18 March 1904) was a Scottish sculptor, executing portraits and monuments in marble and bronze.

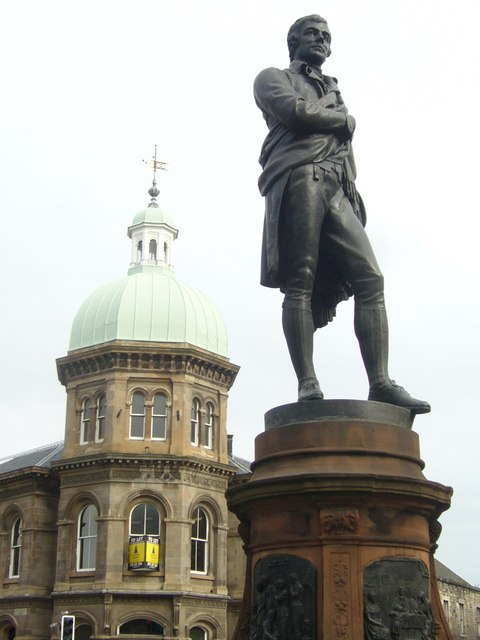
Robert Burns statue, Bernard Street, Leith, 1898, by David Watson Stevenson

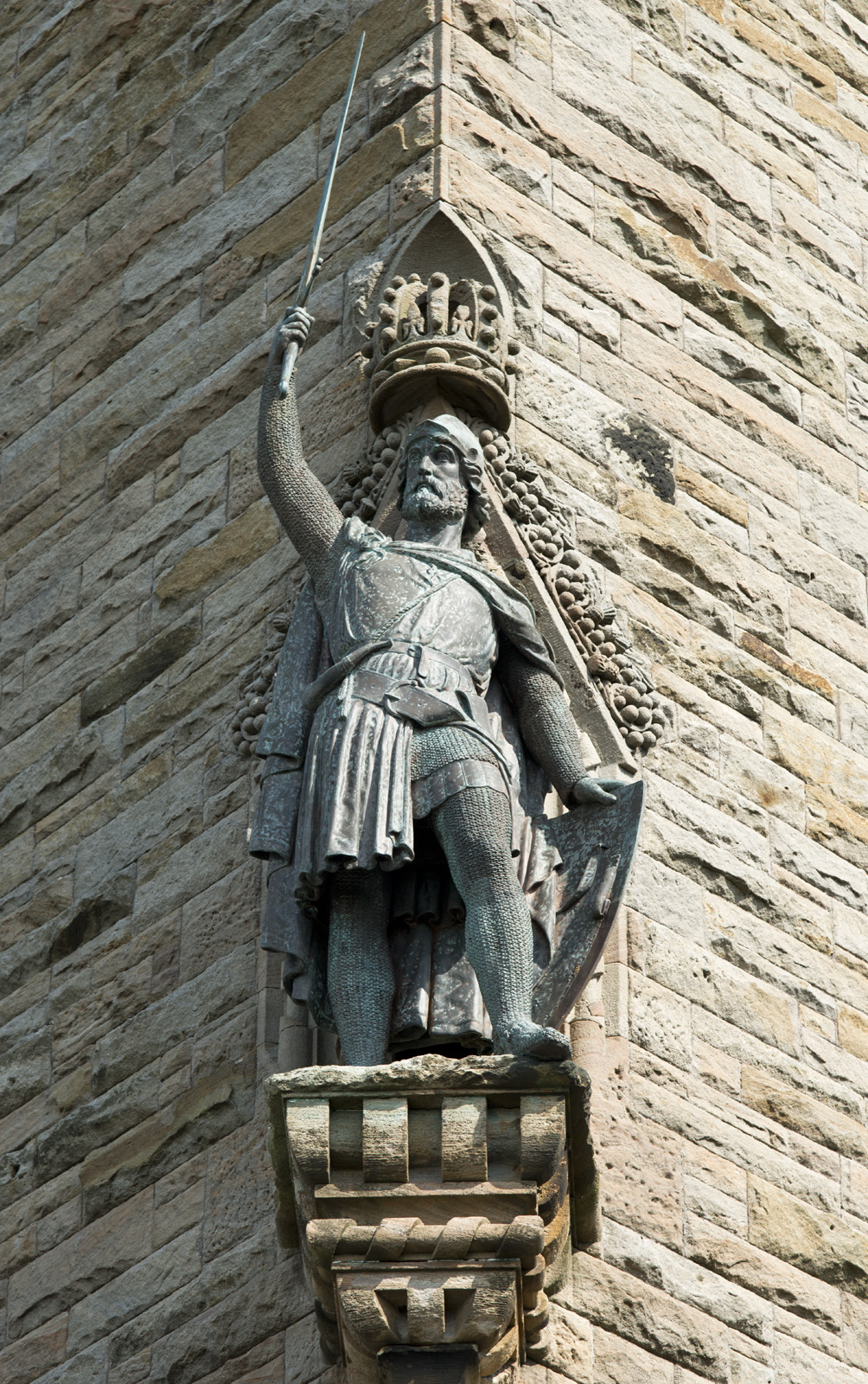
Wallace on the Wallace Monument

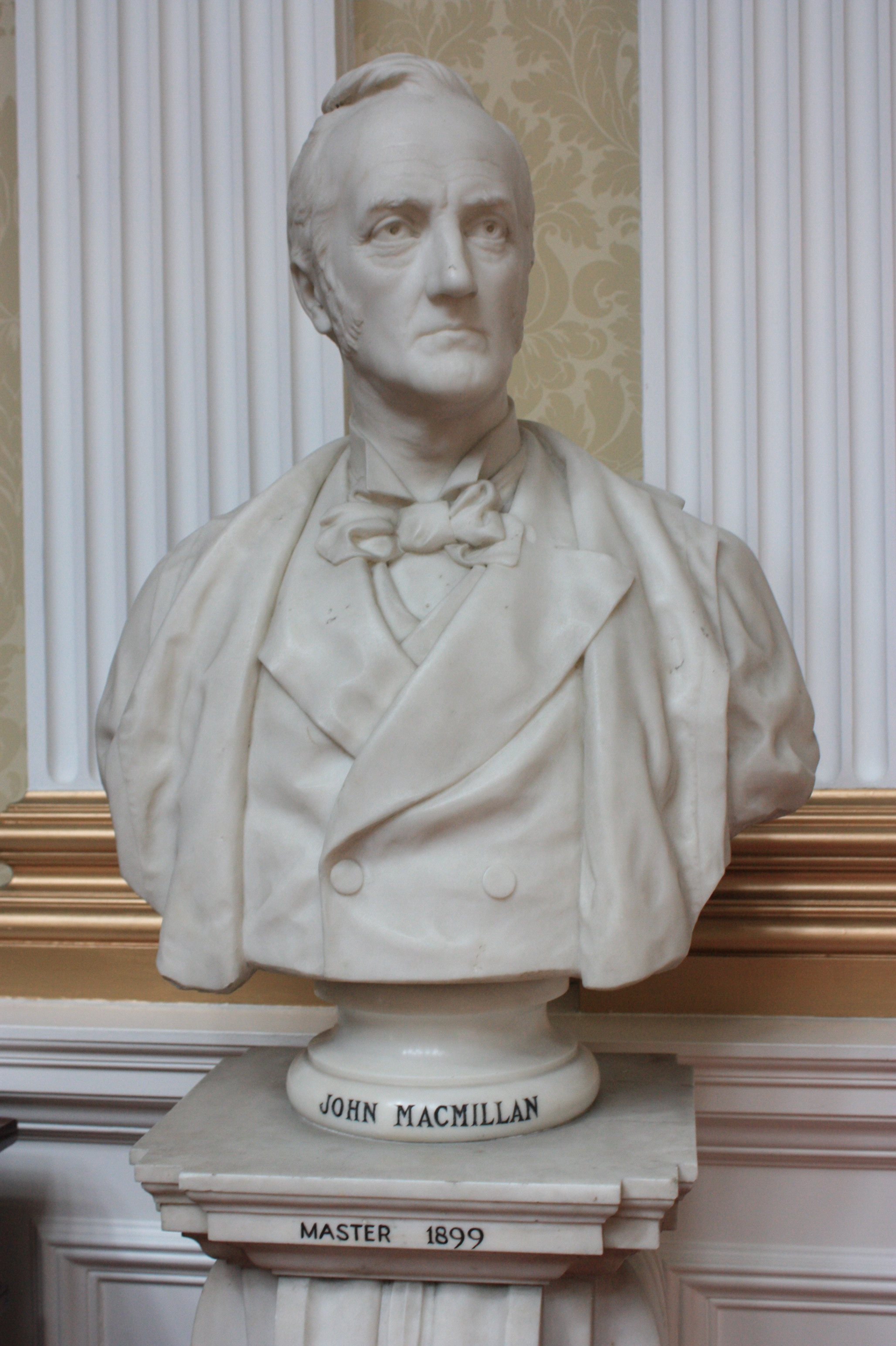
John MacMillan, Master of the Merchant Company, Edinburgh in 1899, by David Watson Stevenson 1901

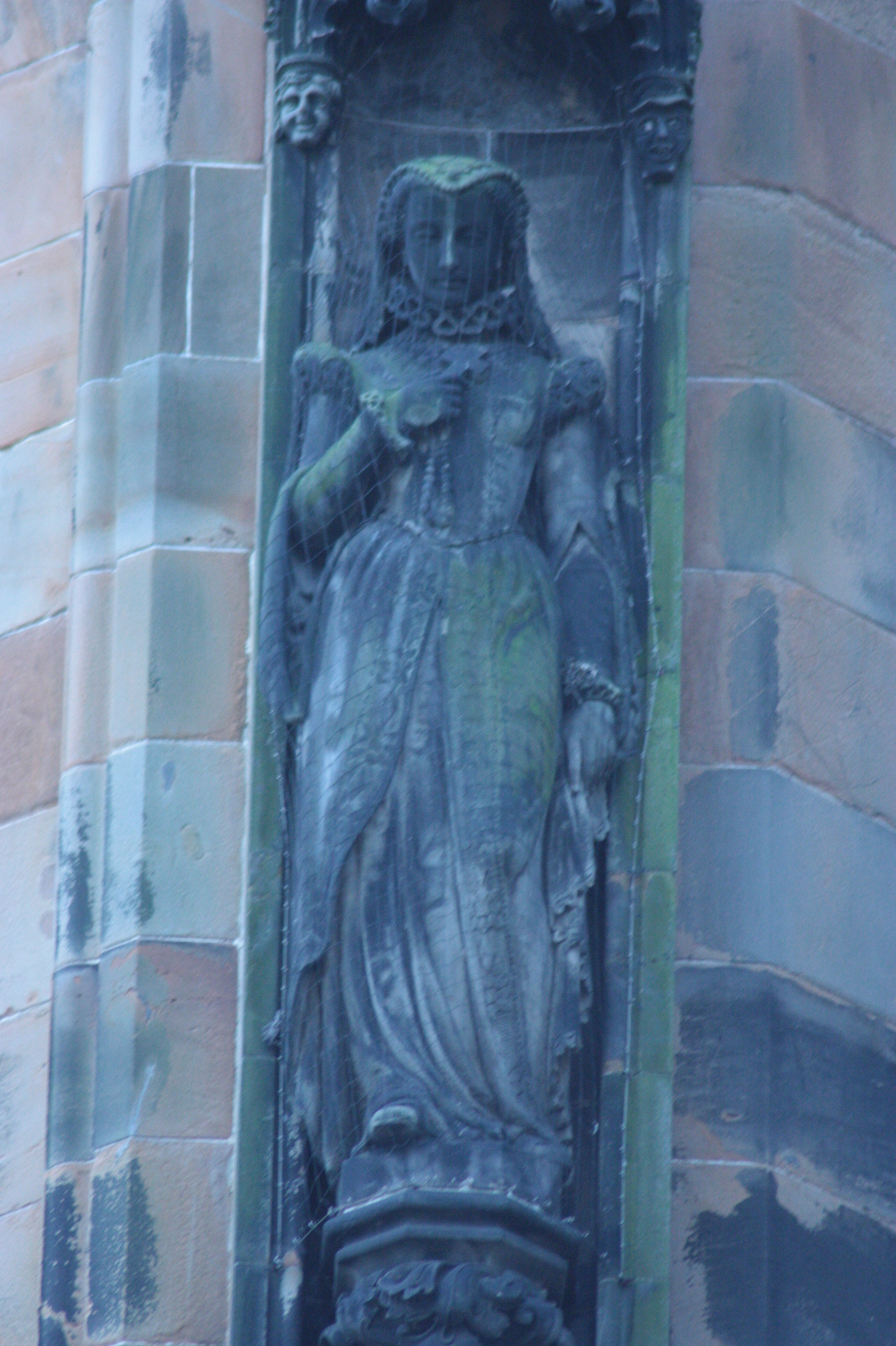
Mary Queen of Scots by D W Stevenson, Scott Monument, Edinburgh

== Biography ==
Stevenson was born in Ratho, Midlothian, Scotland, on 25 March 1842, the son of William Stevenson and Margaret Kay. He studied at the Trustees' Academy, Edinburgh. From 1860 he took an eight-year apprenticeship under the sculptor William Brodie. He won the South Kensington National Prize for student sculpture with a statuette of the Venus de Milo and completed his studies in Rome, Italy.

He worked as assistant to Sir John Steell on the Prince Albert Monument forming the centrepiece of Charlotte Square in Edinburgh. Here he added figures of "Science & Learning" and "Labour" on the corners. He became known for his portrait sculptures executed in marble and bronze. His best known and most iconic work is the 1869 bronze figure of William Wallace on the Wallace Monument near Stirling.

He became a member of the Royal Scottish Academy. He lived in a townhouse at 2 Castle Terrace facing onto St Cuthbert's Churchyard at the west end of Princes Street.

Stevenson died on 18 March 1904, aged 61. His funeral took place at his brother's home. Several Royal Scottish Academicians attended the funeral. The 1st Highland Company of the Queen's Rifle Volunteer Brigade, which D.W. Stevenson had previously commanded, was also respresented.

He is buried with his younger brother, William Grant Stevenson, also a sculptor, in the south-west section of Grange Cemetery in Edinburgh. The bronze portrait relief head of William on the monument was sculpted by Henry Snell Gamley.

== Works ==
Stevenson's most famous and publicly seen statue is the figure of William Wallace on the Wallace Monument in Stirling. This 20-foot-tall bronze statue, mounted on the corner of the monument, should not be confused with the modern statue in the parking area near the visitor centre.

Stevenson made the figures of Mary, Queen of Scots, James VI of Scotland, and Halbert Glendinning on the Scott Monument, Edinburgh (1874); the Henry Bolckow Monument, Middlesbrough (1881); Robert Tannahill, Paisley (1884) and (Mary Campbell (Highland Mary)), Dunoon (1896). His sculptures of Sir John Steell a fellow sculptor (1887) and Napier of Murchiston (1898) are held in the Scottish National Portrait Gallery. He also created five of the multiple statues on the exterior of the Portrait Gallery: James Hutton; John Napier; King James VI; James Campbell and Adam Duncan.

He created the Saracen Fountain in cast iron for the Kelvingrove International Exhibition of 1901. It was later moved to Alexandra Park, Glasgow. This included a repeat of three figures from an earlier monument to John Platt (MP) in Oldham (1878). Copies were made for Town Hall Park in Warrington (destroyed 1942) and the Sammy Marks Zoological Gardens in Pretoria, South Africa.

In 1868, he created the impressive Celtic cross as a memorial to Horatio McCulloch on his grave in Warriston Cemetery.

In 1884, he created the statue of Hygieia with Thomas Bonnar's classical "St Bernard's Well" in Stockbridge, Edinburgh.

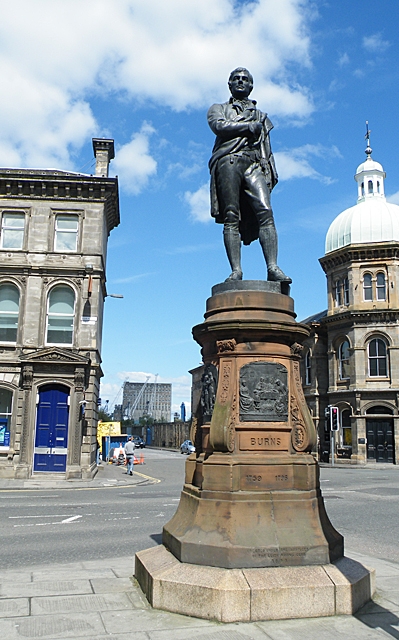
Robert Burns statue by D.W. Stevenson, R.S.A., commissioned by the Burns Club of Leith.

In December 1897, he received a commission from The Burns Club of Leith to create a bronze statue of Robert Burns. The statue was unveiled on October 17, 1898.

=== Gallery ===
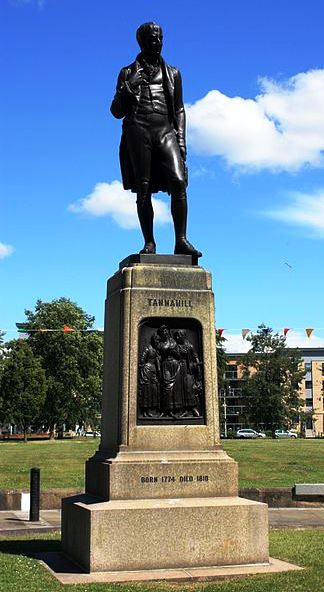
Robert Tannahill by David Watson Stevenson

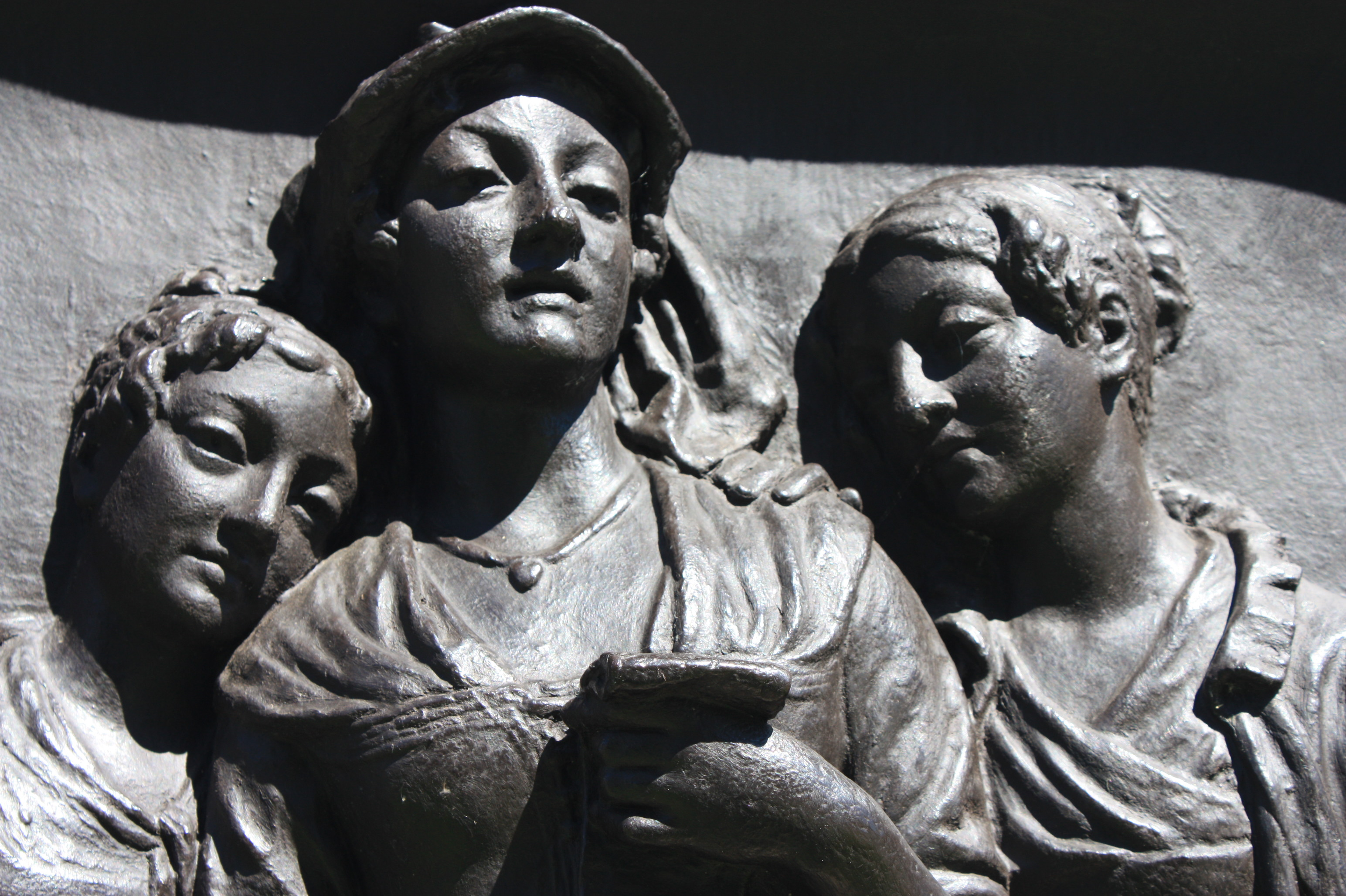
Detail on Robert Tannahill's statue by David Watson Stevenson

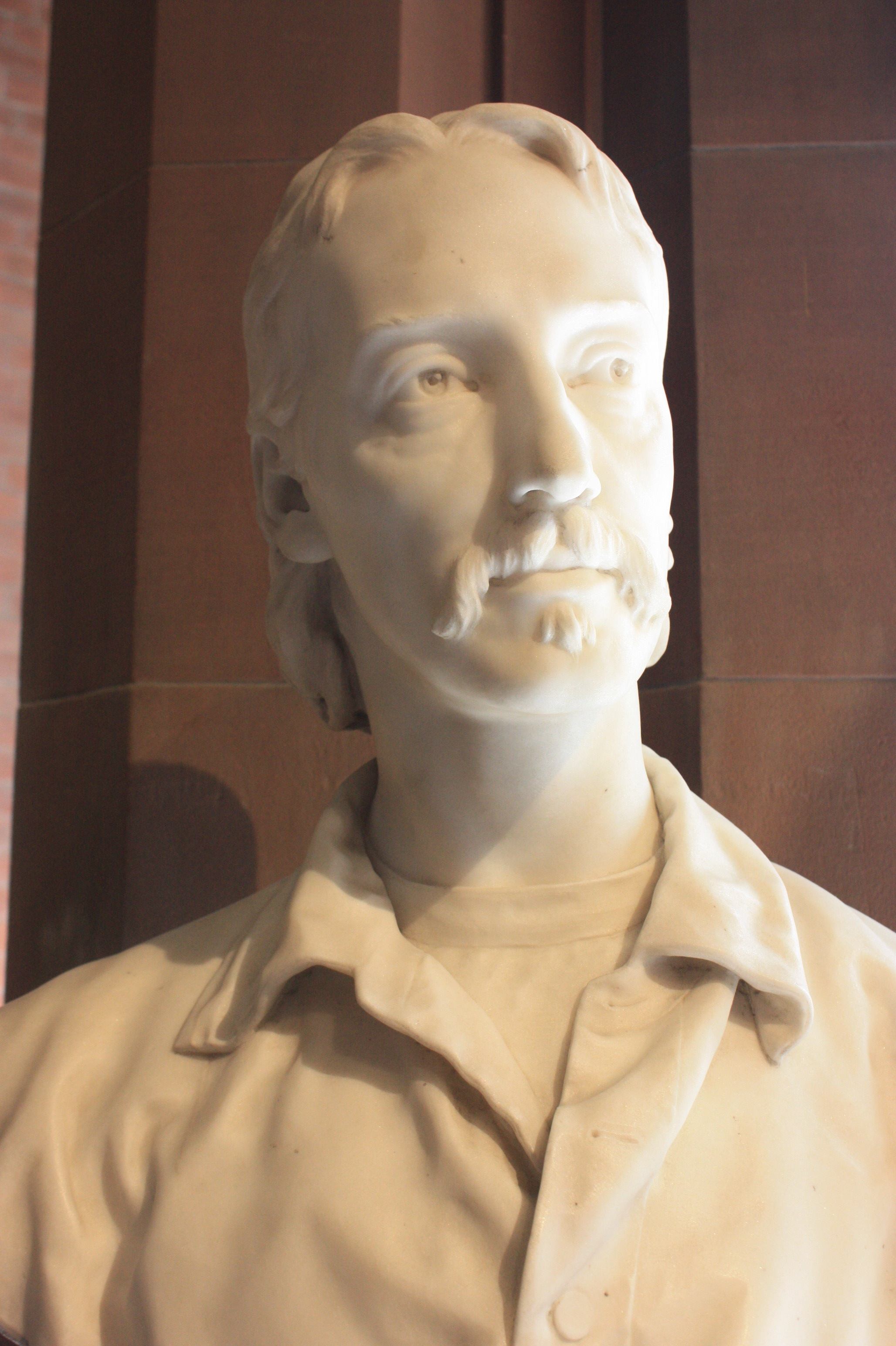
Robert Louis Stevenson by David Watson Stevenson

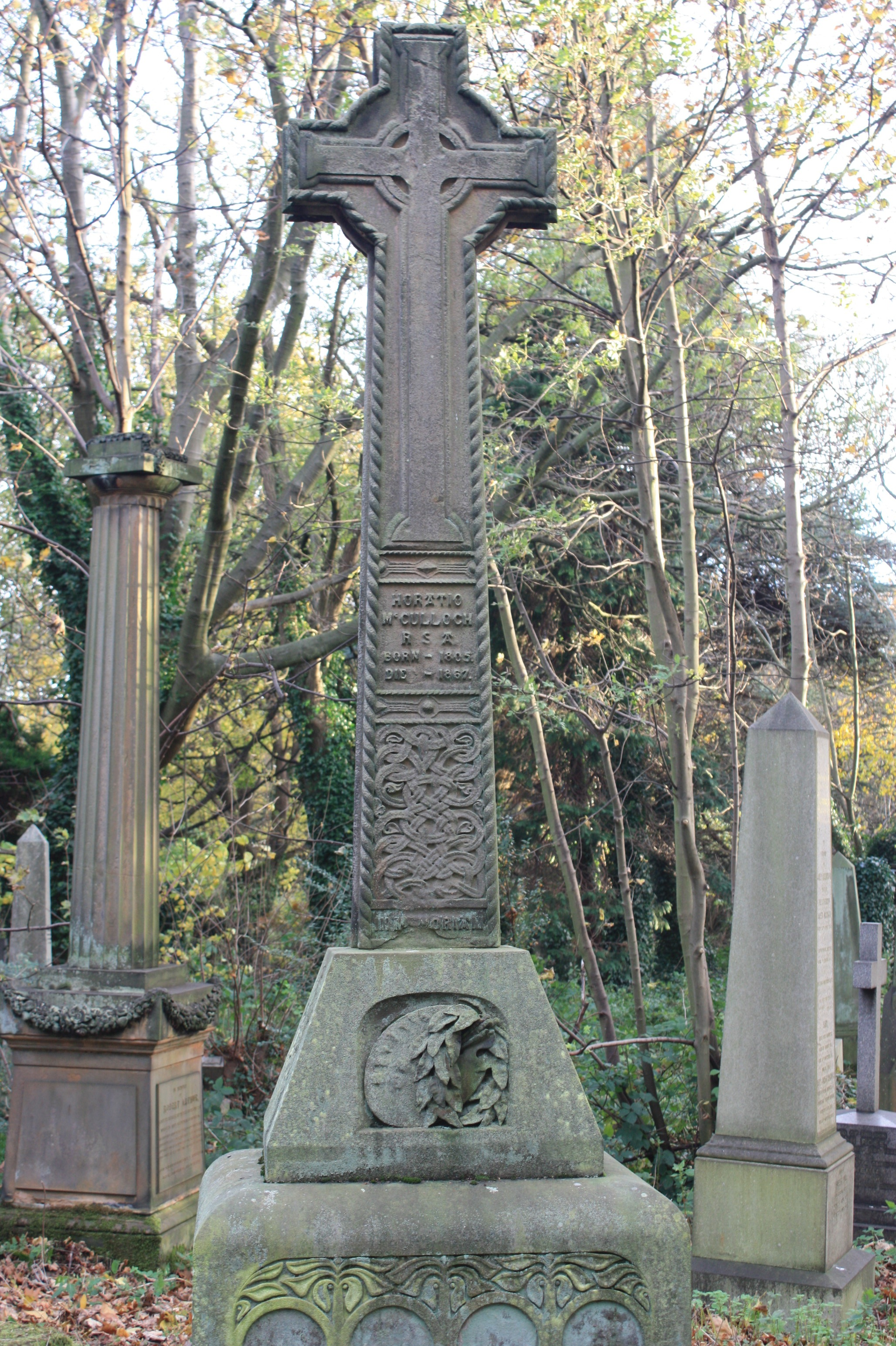
Horatio McCulloch's monument

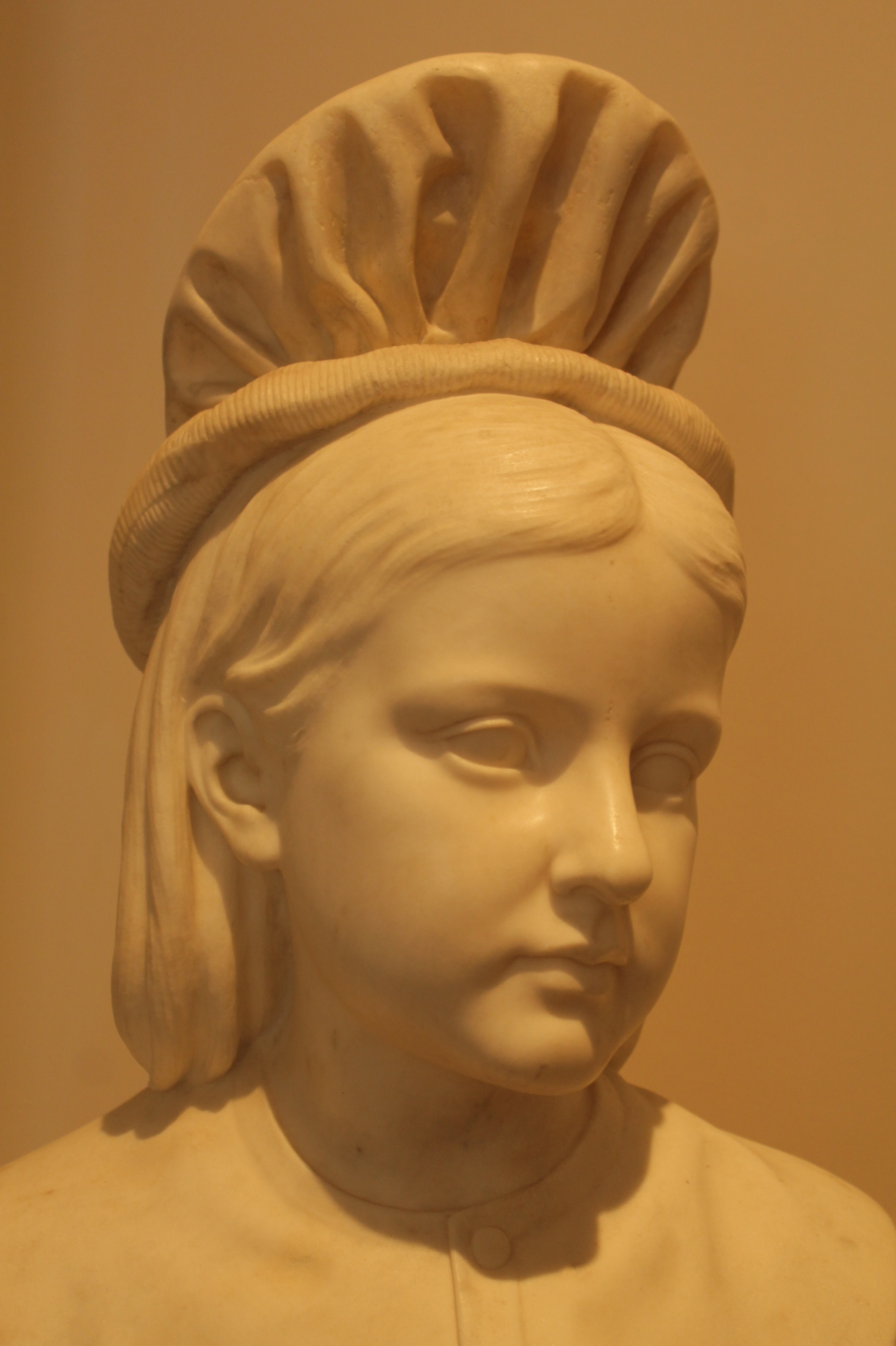
The Foundling Girl (1871)

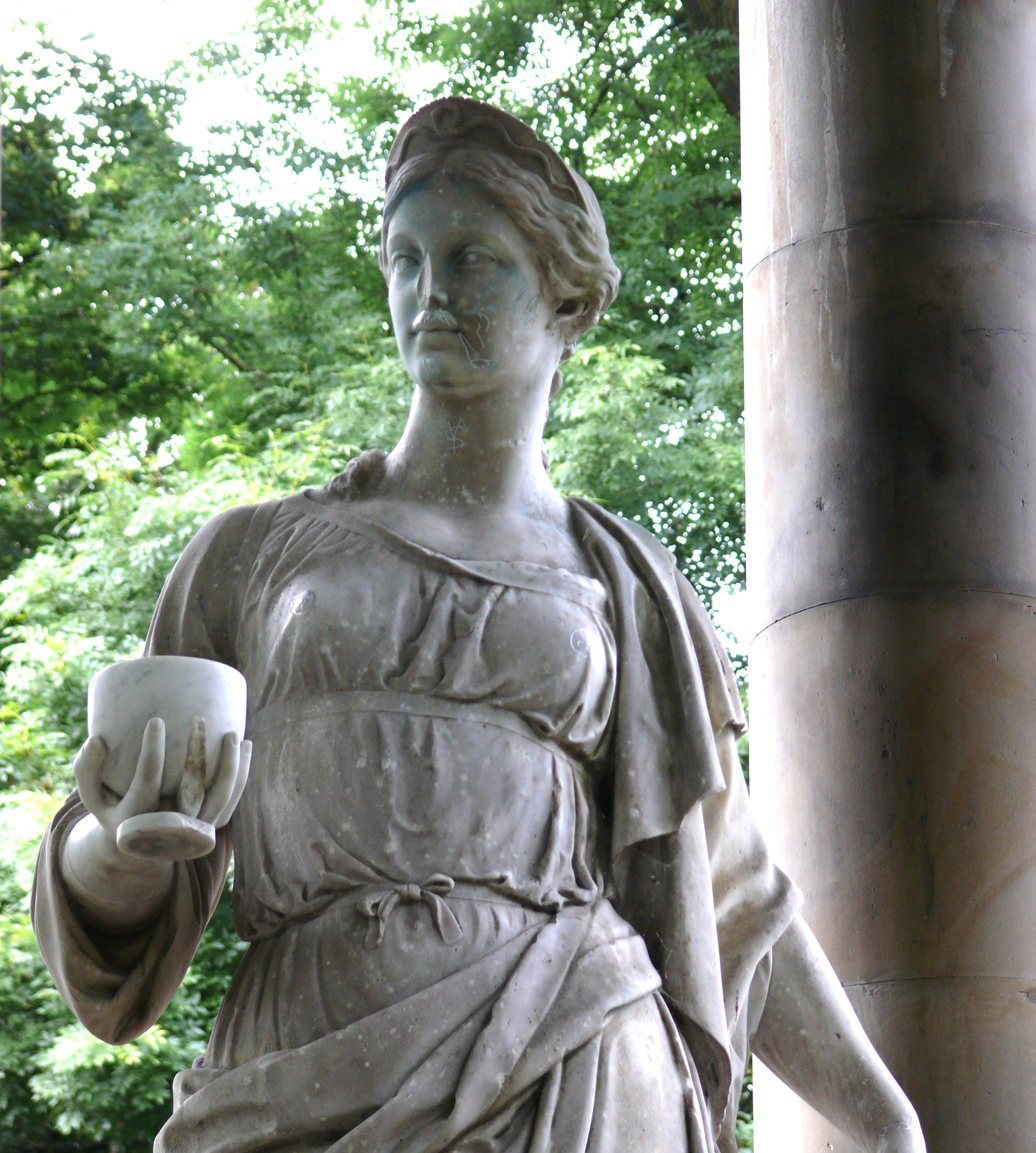
Statue of Hygieia
