= George Clark Stanton =

Scottish sculptor (1832–1894)

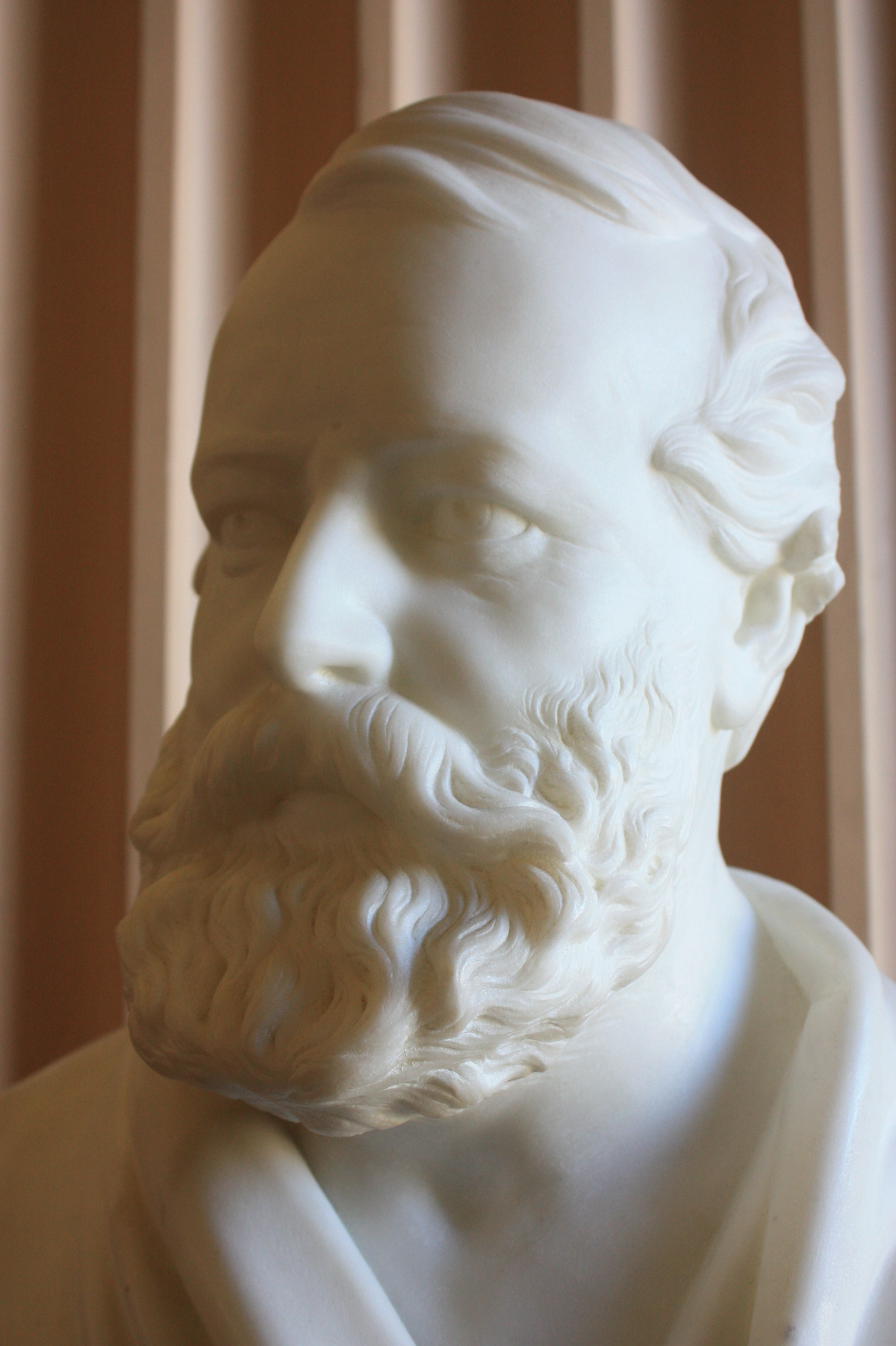
Bust of Prof Thomas Laycock by George Clark Stanton, Old College, University of Edinburgh

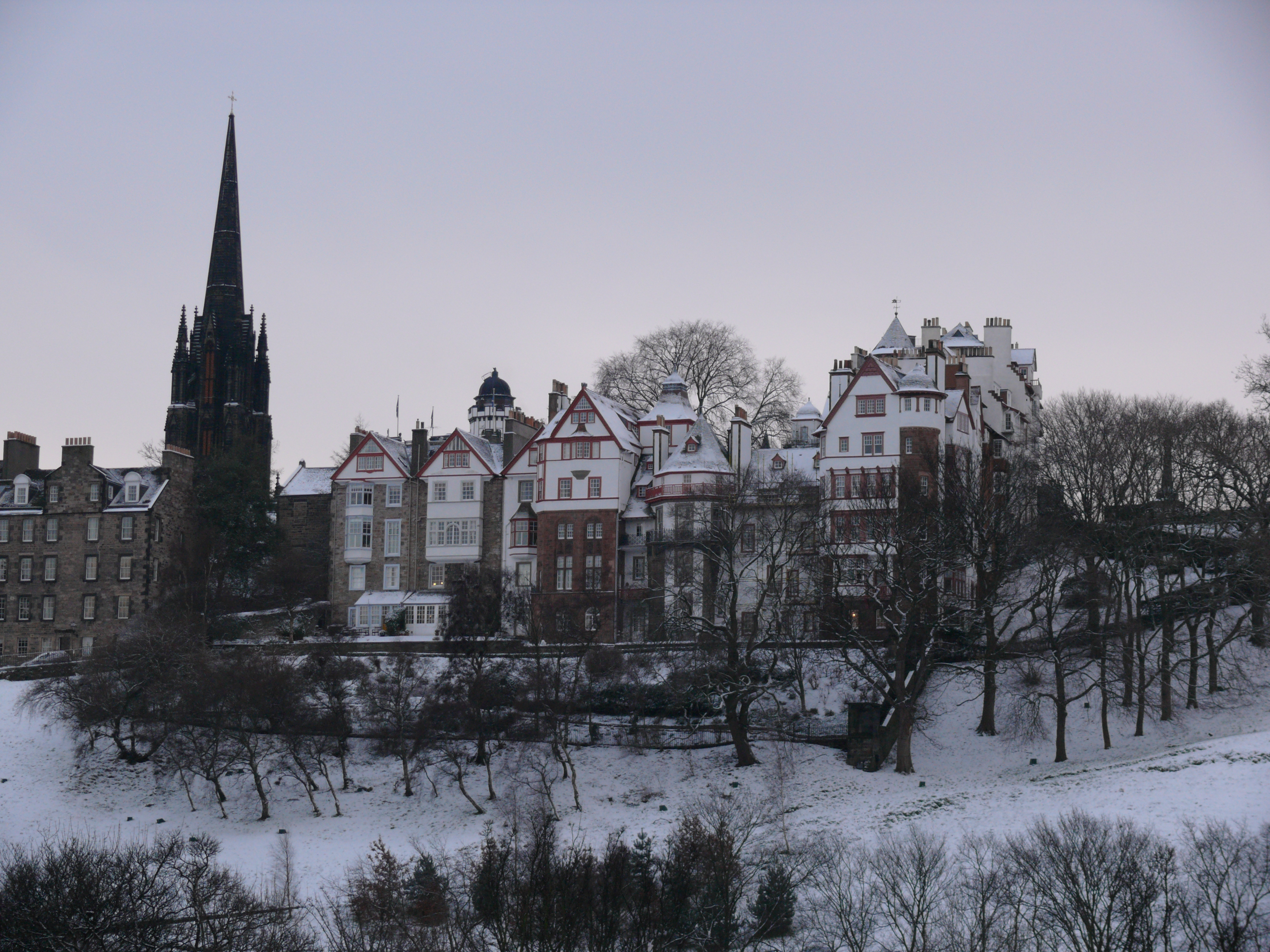
Ramsay Lane (centre) seen from Princes Street

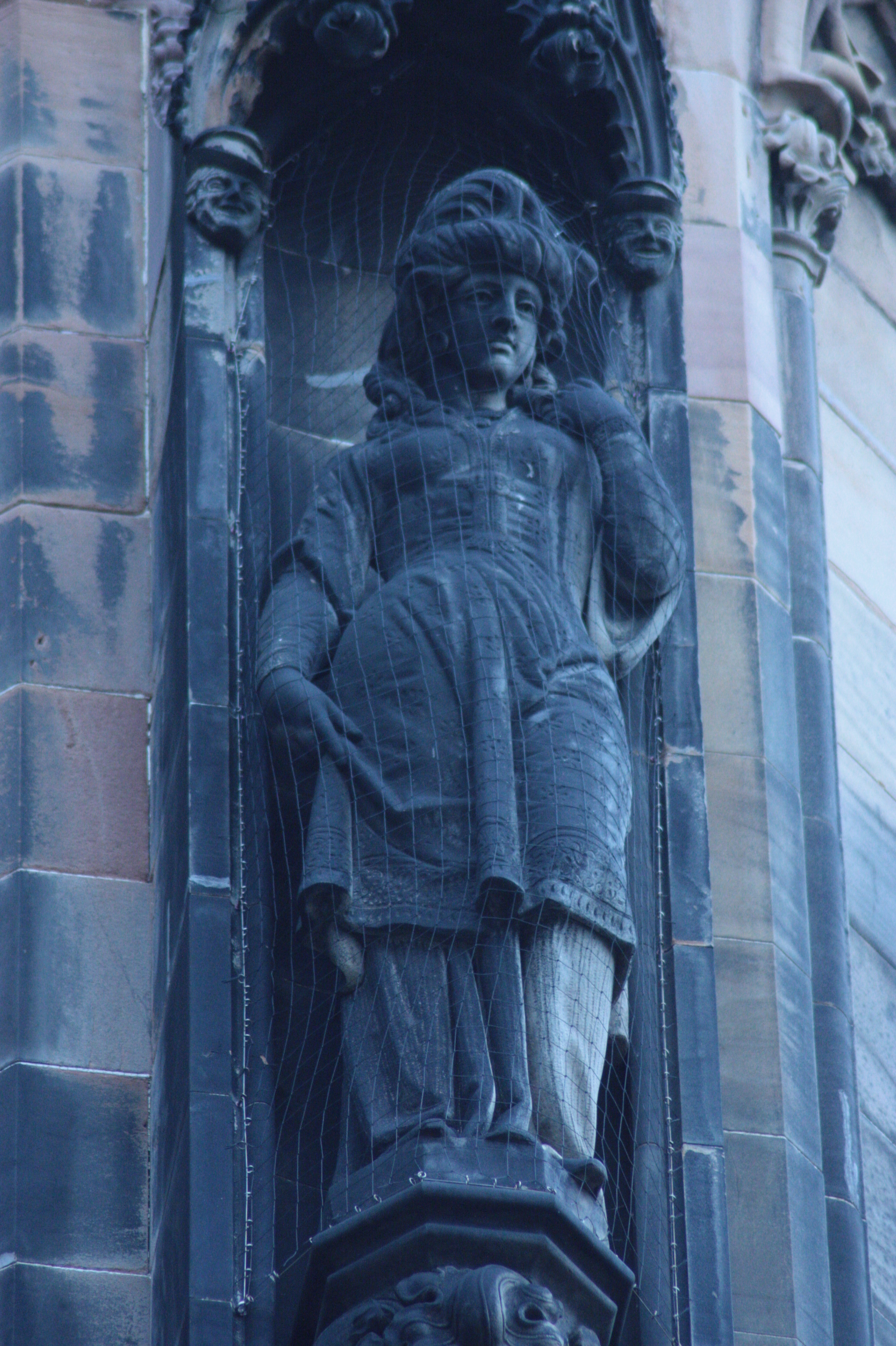
Rebecca by Clark Stanton, Scott Monument, Edinburgh

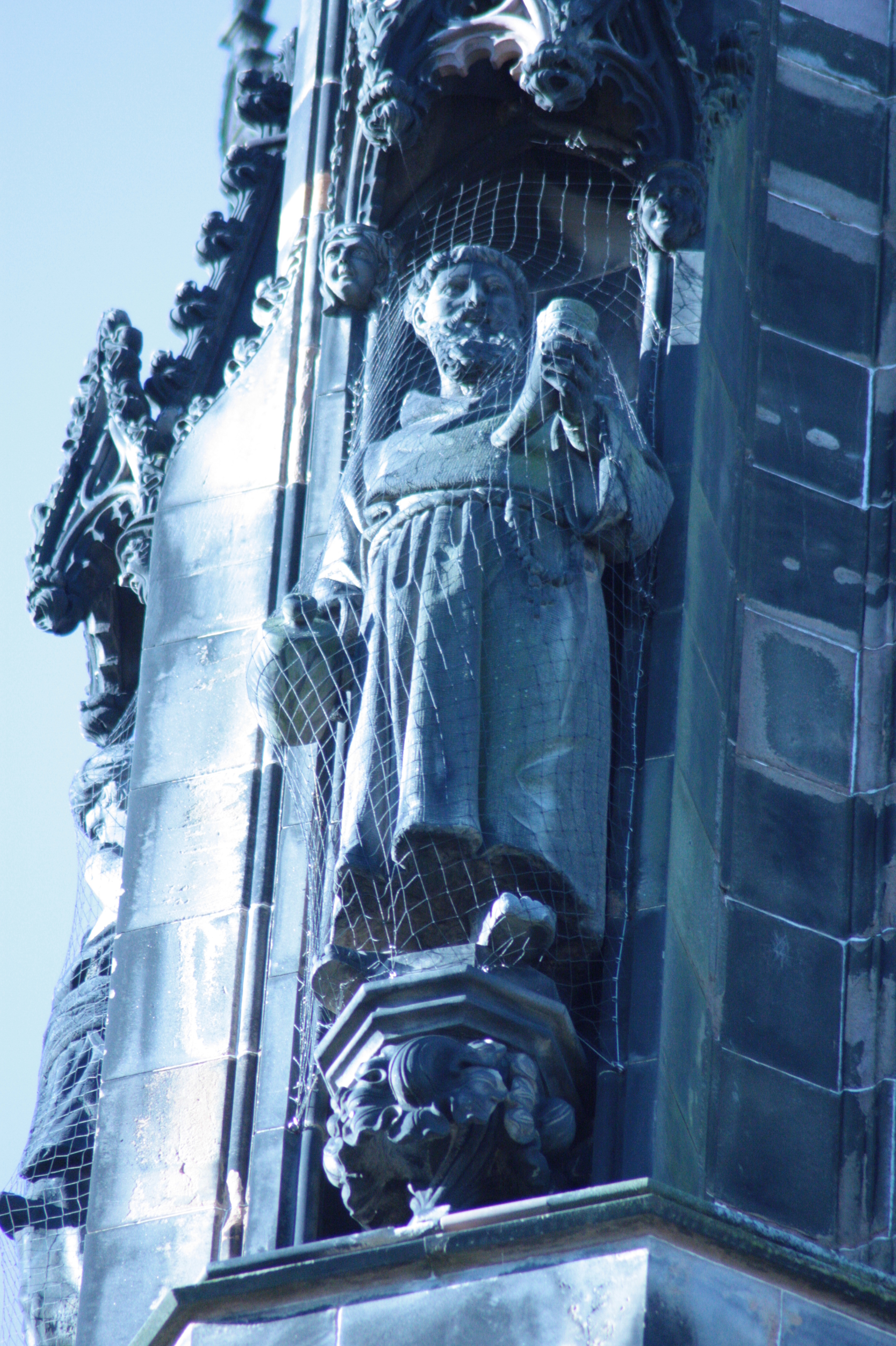
Figure of Friar Tuck, Scott Monument, Edinburgh

George Clark Stanton RSA (11 June 1832 – 8 January 1894) was a 19th-century Scottish sculptor, silversmith and portrait miniaturist.

== Life ==
Stanton was educated at King Edward's School, Birmingham and Birmingham School of Art, initially training as a silversmith. In Birmingham he was employed by Elkington & Mason. Some of his work from there is now in the Victoria and Albert Museum in London. He allegedly joined Garibaldi's Redshirts during a trip to Florence, Italy. During this trip he met Clara Camgee, who later became his wife.

In 1855 he moved to Edinburgh, living first at 21 Dublin Street then at 1 Ramsay Lane. He also lived at 24 (now 38) Upper Gray Street.

In 1862 he was elected an associate of the Royal Scottish Academy and in 1885 became a full member.

From 1879 he was Curator of the Royal Scottish Academy Life School.

He lived his final years at Ramsay Lane (part of Ramsay Gardens).

His son, John George Stanton, was also an artist.

== Known works ==
- "Army and Navy" figures, Albert Memorial, Charlotte Square, Edinburgh
- Lower bronze panels on the Duke of Buccleuch Monument, Parliament Square, Royal Mile, Edinburgh
- Figures of Rebecca, Friar Tuck and Sir Pierce Shafton on the Scott Monument, Edinburgh
- Bust of Prof Thomas Laycock, Old College, University of Edinburgh
- William Dick previously at Dick Vet School in Edinburgh
