= The Fortunes of Nigel =

1822 novel by Walter Scott

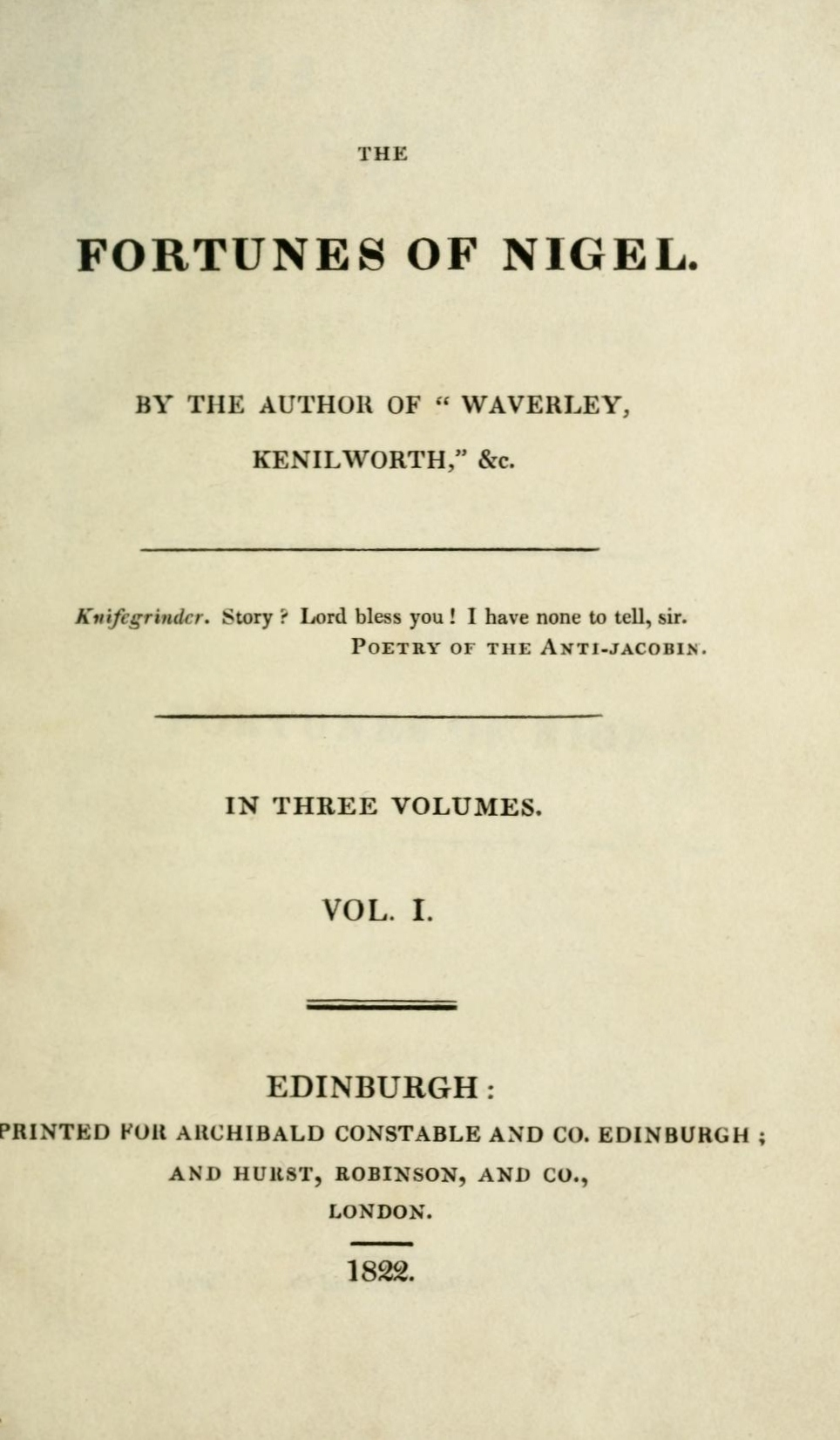
- Author: Sir Walter Scott
- Language: English, Lowland Scots
- Series: Waverley Novels
- Genre: Historical novel
- Publisher: Constable and Co. (Edinburgh); Hurst, Robinson and Co. (London)
- Publication date: 1822
- Publication place: Scotland
- Media type: Print
- Pages: 406 (Edinburgh Edition, 2004)
- Preceded by: The Pirate
- Followed by: Peveril of the Peak

The Fortunes of Nigel is one of the Waverley novels by Sir Walter Scott, published in 1822. Set in London in either 1623 or 1624, it centres on the Scottish community there after the Union of the Crowns and features James VI and I.

== Composition and sources ==
On 30 September 1821 Scott indicated to his publisher Archibald Constable that The Pirate (which he would complete the following month) would be followed by a tale of the time of James VI and I. He began composition immediately The Pirate was finished. The first volume was complete before the end of the year; by the end of January 1822 Scott was halfway through the second volume; there were delays, in part because he devoted a considerable amount of time to the Introductory Epistle, but the work was brought to a conclusion in early May.

Scott's main sources for The Fortunes of Nigel were Jacobean dramas and other imaginative literature of the period, but he was also well acquainted with other contemporaneous publications and more recent studies. For his depiction of James, and details of events during his reign, he was able to draw extensively on his own edition, published in 1811, of Secret History of the Court of James the First, containing a set of contemporaneous or early memoirs and histories. The James of the novel is deliberately treated in a more balanced manner than had been the case in the laudatory An Inquiry into the Literary and Political Character of James I by Isaac D'Israeli (1816). The richness of Scott's treatment of the age is also a result in part of another, more extensive editorial project, his collection known as Somers' Tracts, which had appeared in 13 volumes between 1809 and 1815. Many of the details about Jacobean London in the novel are drawn from A Survey of the Cities of London and Westminster by John Stow, of which Scott owned the revised edition by John Strype published in 1720.

== Editions ==
The first edition was published concurrently in Edinburgh, by Constable, and in London, by Hurst, Robinson, and Co., on 29 May 1822. As with all the Waverley novels before 1827 publication was anonymous. The print run was 12,000 and the price one and a half guineas (£1 11s 6d or £1.57½). There is no reason to think that Scott was involved with the novel again until the late summer of 1830, when he revised the text and provided new notes and an introduction for the 'Magnum' edition, in which it appeared as Volumes 26 and 27 in July and August 1831.

The standard modern edition, by Frank Jordan, was published in 2004 as Volume 13 of the Edinburgh Edition of the Waverley Novels: it is based on the first edition with emendations mainly from Scott's manuscript and proof corrections; the Magnum material is included in Volume 25b.

== Plot introduction ==
A young Scottish nobleman, Nigel Olifaunt, Lord Glenvarloch, travels to London in order to ask the King to repay his father's loan. Nigel wishes to use the money to pay off a mortgage on his estate—but the Duke of Buckingham and Prince Charles already have their eyes on it. The lord is drawn into the chaotic life of the court, and when he becomes an enemy of the profligate Lord Dalgarno, he finds himself in grave danger.

== Plot summary ==
David Ramsay, a watchmaker, lives with his daughter Margaret on Fleet Street. He has two apprentices, Mr Vincent and Mr Tunstall. The two apprentices had run off to join in a street fray, and the goldsmith George Heriot was gossiping with Ramsay, when they brought in a fellow named Richie Moniplies with a broken head and very tattered garments. His wound having been dressed, he explained that he had come to London with his master Nigel Olifaunt to obtain payment of a debt owing to him by the king, and had been set upon as a stranger. Next morning Nigel received a visit, at his lodging with the chandler and his wife, from the goldsmith, who had known his father, and, having warned him that his estate was in danger, lent him money to appear in proper attire in Court. Heriot proceeded to Whitehall, and, having presented the young lord's petition, King James authorised him to advance part of the sum due, and promised to interest himself in his affairs.

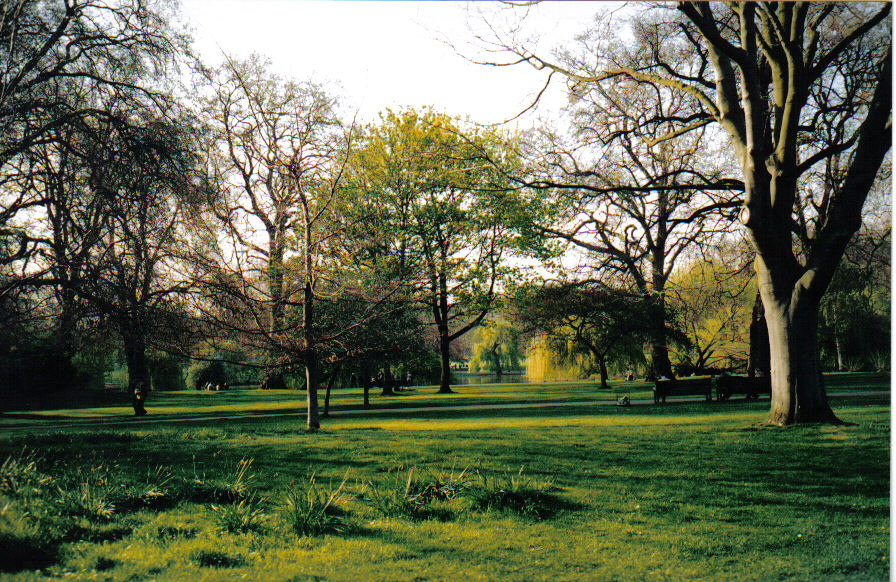
St. James's Park today

Dining with him the same day at the goldsmith's, in company with her father and Sir Mungo, Margaret lost her heart to Nigel, and employed Dame Ursula, the barber's wife, to ascertain all particulars respecting him. On being presented at Court by Lord Huntinglen he obtained an order for payment of his claim, and was introduced to the Duke of Buckingham, who announced himself as his enemy, and to the Duke's son, Lord Dalgarno, by whom he was initiated in all the vices of the aristocracy of that period, although warned by Richie, and by an anonymous letter. Meeting the Prince of Wales, later Charles I, in St. James's Park, attended by several courtiers, Nigel learnt from their manner, as well as from Sir Mungo, that he had been ill spoken of to Charles, upon which he challenged Dalgarno in the precincts of the Court, and was compelled to take refuge in Whitefriars to avoid arrest.

Here he renewed his acquaintance with the barrister Lowestoffe, whom he had met at Beaujeu's tavern, and was assigned to the care of old Trapbois the lodging-house keeper and his daughter. On hearing of Nigel's trouble Margaret sought an interview with Lady Hermione, who occupied a suite of apartments in Heriot's mansion, and, having revealed her secret, was supplied with money to help him, being told at the same time by her confidant of the ill usage she had suffered from Lord Dalgarno. Vincent, who was in love with his master's daughter, and had been encouraged by Dame Ursula in extravagant habits, was now engaged by her to act as his rival's guide in effecting his escape from London. The same night old Trapbois was murdered by two ruffians who came to rob him; and, just as he had rescued the daughter, whom the bailiff Hildebrod had advised him to marry, Nigel was accosted by the apprentice, dressed as a waterman, from whom he learnt that a warrant had been issued for his apprehension, and that a boat was in readiness for him to give the king's officers the slip. Martha begged that she might accompany him, and, having secured her father's treasure, they were conducted by Vincent to the Temple Stairs. Having landed his companion at Paul's Wharf, where she was taken charge of by Moniplies, Nigel insisted on disembarking at Greenwich, instead of joining a Scotch vessel which was waiting for him at Gravesend; and having made his way to the park, he attended the king while he killed a deer, when he was recognised and consigned to the Tower.

Presently Margaret, dressed as a boy, was shown into the same room; then the chandler came to claim his wife, whom he accused Nigel of having carried off; and, after he had dined, his friend Heriot arrived to reproach him with the position in which he had placed himself. He had also lost the king's warrant for his debt, and when his companion's disguise was detected, she saved him from further embarrassment by a full confession. One of her acts had been to present a petition to the king from Lady Hermione, on reading which he had commanded that Lord Dalgarno should instantly marry her; and another to offer such explanations respecting Nigel as induced his Majesty to pardon him. One hour only, however, remained within which to redeem his estates, when Moniplies appeared with the money, and Lord Dalgarno, who hoped to have secured them, was deprived of his revenge. The next day he was shot in Enfield Chase, where Captain Colepepper had planned to waylay him, as he was waiting, in company with Dame Nelly, and a page in charge of the treasure, to fight a duel with Nigel. Vincent and Lowestoffe, however, arrived in time to put two of the robbers to flight, while Moniplies killed the captain, who was suspected of having murdered Trapbois, and Christie recovered his wife. Nigel and Margaret were soon afterwards married; and as King James was honouring the feast with his presence, Richie presented Martha as his bride, who, at the same time, handed to the preserver of her life the deeds of the Glenvarloch estates, which she had freed from all liabilities, and the royal sign-manual which had been found among her father's papers.

== Characters ==
Principal characters in bold

- **David Ramsay**, a watchmaker in Fleet Street
- **Margaret Ramsay**, his daughter
- (Jenny), his laundry-maid
- **Jenkin Vincent** ('Jin Vin') and **Francis Tunstall**, his apprentices
- **George Heriot**, a goldsmith of Lombard Street
- Judith, his sister
- Roberts, his cash-keeper
- **Lord Glenvarloch, or Nigel Olifaunt**
- **Richie Moniplies**, his servant
- Laurence Linklater, a yeoman of the royal kitchen
- John Christie, a ship chandler
- Dame Nelly, his wife
- Benjamin Suddlechop, a barber in Fleet Street
- Dame Ursula, his wife
- **King James VI of Scots and I of England**
- Maxwell, his gentleman usher
- **George Villiers, 1st Duke of Buckingham** ('Steenie')
- Knighton, his servant
- Lord Huntinglen
- **Lord Dalgarno**, his son
- Lutin, Dalgarno's page
- The Countess of Blackchester, Dalgarno's sister
- Reginald Lowestoffe, a barrister
- Beaujeu, host of an ordinary or gambling tavern
- **Sir Mungo Malagrowther**, a friend of Nigel's father
- **Charles, Prince of Wales** ('Baby Charles')
- Sir Ewes Haldimund, a courtier
- Duke Hildebrod
- Old Trapbois, a lodging-house keeper at Whitefriars
- **Martha**, his daughter
- **Lady Hermione**, afterwards Lady Dalgarno
- Monna Paula, her servant
- **Captain Colepepper**, a cutthroat adventurer
- Sir Edward Mansel, Governor of the Tower
- Lady Mansel, his wife
- Andrew Skurliewhitter, a scrivener

== Chapter summary ==
Introductory Epistle: Captain Clutterbuck of Kennaquhair tells Dr Dryasdust of York of his conversation with the Author of Waverley, in which the novelist defended his manner of composition.

Volume One

Ch. 1: In the City of London the watchmaker David Ramsay's apprentices, Jenkin Vincent (Jin Vin) and Frank Tunstall, accost passers-by, including a down-at-heel Scot [Richie Moniplies].

Ch. 2: Jin and Frank bring Richie, who has been assaulted in the street, to their master's shop, where he is being visited by George Heriot the goldsmith.

Ch. 3: In John Christie's house, where he is lodging, Nigel Olifaunt (Lord Glenvarloch) discusses Richie's absence with Dame Nelly Christie. Richie arrives and tells of his unsuccessful attempt to present Nigel's supplication to King James for the repayment of large sums advanced by his father to the monarch.

Ch. 4: Heriot arrives, and Richie confesses that he presented a supplication of his own to James along with that of his master, leading to his rebuttal by the King. Heriot tells Nigel that his attempt to secure a financial settlement is powerfully opposed at Court; he promises to find an opportunity of presenting his supplication, and lends him gold.

Ch. 5: Heriot invites Ramsay to bring his daughter Margaret to dine with Nigel and himself at noon the next day. He has a fair copy of the supplication made and presents it to a sympathetic James in the course of selling him a fine silver salver. The King gives him a carcanet of rubies as a pledge for a loan to meet Nigel's immediate needs.

Ch. 6: At Heriot's dinner, where Nigel meets Sir Mungo Malagrowther, the salver is returned by orders of the Duke of Buckingham, with contempt.

Ch. 7: A mysterious lady [Hermione] appears at Heriot's family prayers; Richie tells Nigel that she is popularly held to be a spirit.

Ch. 8: Dame Ursula Suddlechop is summoned by Margaret, who asks her to find out about Nigel's business at Court.

Ch. 9: Heriot conducts Nigel to Court, where Lord Huntinglen presents him to James and uses his influence to persuade the King to right his wrongs. As they are leaving Huntinglen introduces Nigel to Buckingham, who openly disapproves of Nigel's suit, and of the part played in its success by Heriot and Huntinglen.

Ch. 10: Heriot and Huntinglen arrange for a scrivener [Andrew Skurliewhitter] to draw up legal documents to enable Nigel to obtain funds in London to redeem the mortgage on his estate pending the compliance with the King's sign manual, or warrant, by the Scottish Exchequer. Nigel takes to Lord Dalgarno on their first meeting, but Dalgarno mocks his desire to return to Scotland.

Ch. 11: Dalgarno persuades Nigel to pay a visit to an ordinary, or gambling tavern.

Volume Two

Ch. 1 (12): At the ordinary, run by the Chevalier Beaujeu, a soldier [Captain Colepepper] is apparently run through (but actually unhurt) in a quarrel with a citizen [Jin Vin], after which Dalgarno takes Nigel to the Fortune Theatre.

Ch. 2 (13): Over several weeks, Nigel becomes used to fashionable society, partly under the influence of Dalgarno's sister, the Countess of Blackchester. He experiences a worrying delay in the ratification of the sign manual by ministers.

Ch. 3 (14): Richie leaves for Scotland in protest against Nigel's worsening behaviour, telling him that his corruptors are laughing at him. Nigel receives an anonymous note warning him that Dalgarno is a false friend.

Ch. 4 (15): In Saint James's Park, Malagrowther sarcastically mocks Nigel's new life style. After the Prince of Wales has passed (accompanied by Dalgarno and the Duke of Buckingham) Malagrowther says that Charles expressed to him his disapproval of Nigel's conduct.

Ch. 5 (16): Nigel strikes Dalgarno in the park and prepares to take refuge in Alastia in disguise under the guidance of Reginald Lowestoffe.

Ch. 6 (17): Lowestoffe outlines the rules of Alsatia before Nigel is admitted by Duke Hildebrod and lodged with Old Trapbois.

Ch. 7 (18): Margaret goes to Heriot's and asks Judith for access to Hermione, who had been her instructress when a girl.

Ch. 8 (19): Hermione agrees to lend Margaret money to help Nigel, with whom she is in love.

Ch. 9 (20): Hermione, who is related to the Glenvarlochs on her mother's side, tells Margaret her story: the man who had subjected her to a false marriage in Spain had tried to pass her on to a friend.

Ch. 10 (21): Jin complains to Ursula that she has encouraged him to become a gambler in a scheme to endear him to Margaret by appearing fashionable. She now enlists him as Margaret's agent, using Hermione's money, to help Nigel escape abroad.

Ch. 11 (22): Martha Trapbois warns Nigel not to trust her father, or anyone else in Alsatia. A messenger arrives with his trunk and the news that Lowestoffe has been imprisoned in the Marshalsea for assisting him.

Ch. 12 (23): Colepepper arrives to court Martha, and Nigel sends him packing. Martha laments her father's vulnerability. Hildebrod urges Nigel to marry Martha as a way out of his financial difficulties.

Ch. 13 (24): Nigel gives Trapbois two gold coins for his rent, but Martha returns one of them. After Trapbois has tried to recover it Nigel gives it to him. Later in the night he repels two intruders who have murdered the miser.

Volume Three

Ch. 1 (25): Martha summons Hildebrod, who promises to apprehend Colepepper (clearly one of her father's assailants) at the appropriate time. A waterman conveys to Nigel Lowestoffe's advice to prepare to leave Alsatia before the authorities arrive to arrest him. Martha insists on coming with Nigel, and they prepare her father's money chest for the journey.

Ch. 2 (26): Travelling downstream, Nigel arranges for Martha and the chest to be put off at Christie's. She is refused entry, but Richie takes pity on her.

Ch. 3 (27): Nigel asks the waterman Jack in the Green [Jin Vin] to be put ashore at Greenwich, where Linklater, the royal cook and Richie's acquaintance, admits him to the park. He encounters James hunting and is transferred to the Tower for investigation.

Ch. 4 (28): A boy joins Nigel in his cell at the Tower. Christie arrives and accuses Nigel of seducing his wife.

Ch. 5 (29): Nigel discovers that the boy is a woman. Heriot arrives and rebukes Nigel for his behaviour, accusing him of pledging the sign manual (which is missing from Nigel's casket) for cash. The woman is revealed as Margaret, who tells how she had accompanied Monna Paula to Greenwich to present a petition on behalf of Monna's mistress Hermione, and had been transferred to the Tower.

Ch. 6 (30): After Heriot has left the Tower, Sir Mungo (who had alerted him to his daughter's adventure) talks Nigel through the punishment of amputation due for drawing his rapier in the royal precincts.

Ch. 7 (31): Richie resumes attendance on Nigel and restores to James the carcanet of rubies which the King had given Heriot as security for his payment to Nigel in Ch. 5, but James refuses to show favour to Nigel in return [having another plan in mind, as revealed in Ch. 33].

Ch. 8 (32): Huntinglen learns from James that his son was Hermione's false lover in Spain and insists that he must marry her. Dalgarno does so, happy in the knowledge that he is acquiring her rights over the Glenvarloch estate unless it is redeemed by noon the following day.

Ch. 9 (33): James tells his council that he arranged to be an eavesdropper at the scene in the Tower which he had set up (Chs 28‒29). Nigel will consequently be set free.

Ch. 10 (34): Richie and Lowestoffe bring Andrew Skurliewhitter bags of money to redeem Nigel's estate. Dalgarno tells Richie in the street of his proposed route north, in the hope that Nigel will meet him for a duel at Camlet Moat. He puts pressure on Andrew to lie about the time of the payment. Andrew tells Colepepper of Dalgarno's route, and the captain plans to rob him of the payment money (it is indicated that Andrew and Colepepper had been Trapbois' murderers in Ch. 24).

Ch. 11 (35): Richie encounters Jin, who is down on his luck and intends to join a party led by Colepepper in the robbery of Dalgarno: Richie persuades him to join him in apprehending the thieves.

Ch. 12 (36): Dalgarno and Nelly Christie, whom he has seduced, stop to rest at Camlet Moat. Colepepper's party kill Dalgarno before Richie's party arrive, having been delayed by meeting Christie in pursuit of his wife. Richie kills Colepepper while Dalgarno's page Lutin makes off with the money.

Ch. 13 (37): James has been researching a noble descent for Margaret, enabling him to act as stage manager for her wedding to Nigel. Richie marries Martha, whose fortune provided the money to redeem Nigel's estate.

== Reception ==
Most of the contemporaneous reviewers placed The Fortunes of Nigel in the middle rank of the Waverley novels. With rare exceptions, the plot was judged weak but the individual scenes often of high quality. Although the novel's antiquarian basis was evident, and this was seen to result in a lack of warmth, the picture of the age was highly praised, Alsatia being found particularly striking. The urban setting meant that the author could not display one of his main strengths, the depiction of the natural world. The characters were generally found telling. The presentation of James was almost universally admired, with Malagrowther the next most popular. Margaret and Martha struck several reviewers as being of unusual interest, but Hermione was generally judged a mistake and several critics were concerned at Nigel's moral weakness. The Introductory Epistle was found interesting and attractive: indeed, for more than one reviewer it was the best part of the work.

== Adaptation ==
In 1974, it was made into a television miniseries as a joint venture between BBC, 20th Century-Fox Television and ABC Owned Television Stations, with play airing on BBC in the UK, and ABC in the U.S., but like a majority of the pre-1970s BBC material, the PAL master tapes were wiped entirely. Episodes are becoming available for viewing on YouTube.

== References in other works ==
The book was a favourite of Cardinal Newman, who quoted it in Grammar of Assent and the Apologia.
