= List of public art in Edinburgh =

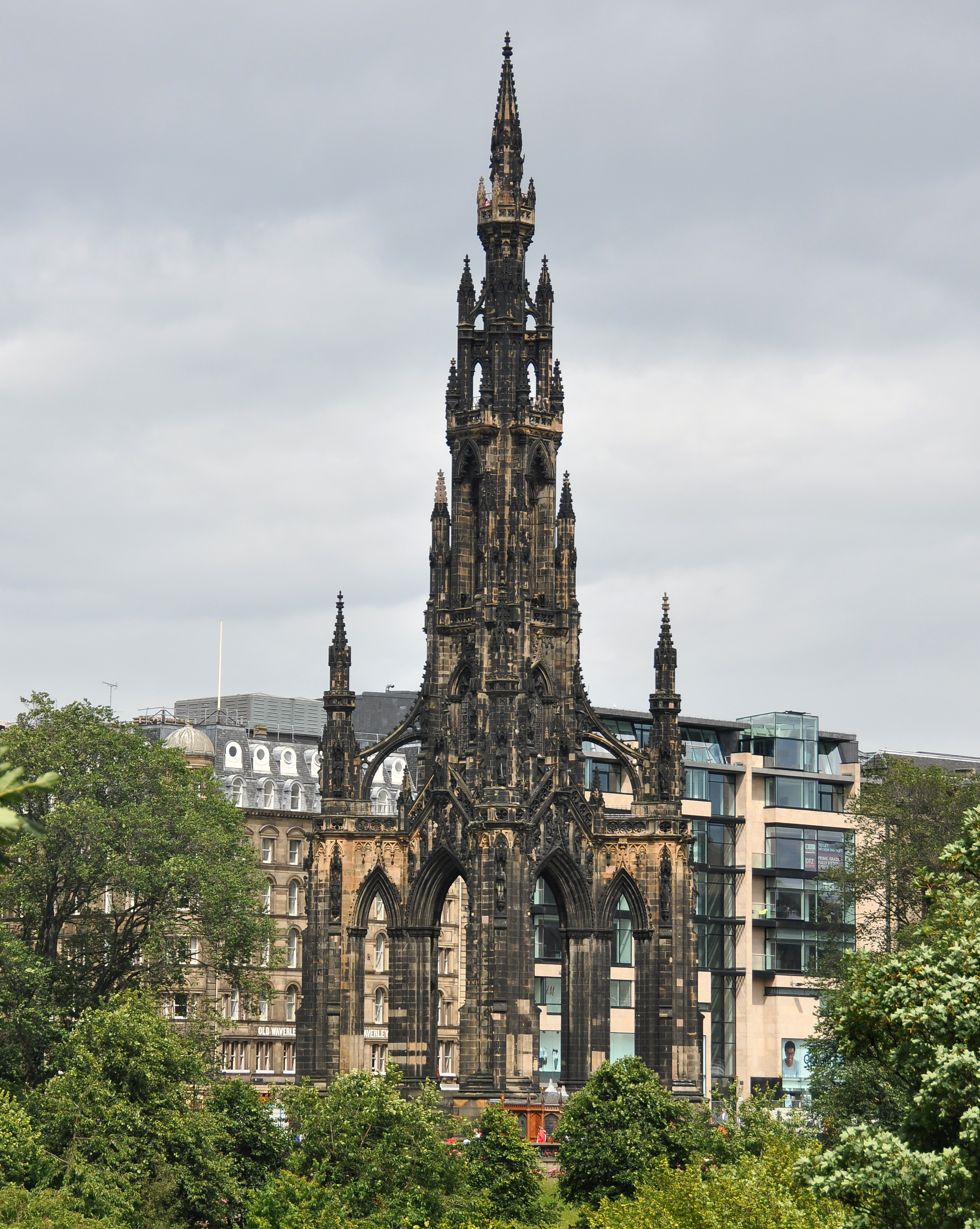
The Scott Monument

This is a list of public art and memorials in Edinburgh, including statues and other sculptures.

== Calton Hill ==
Image	Title / subject	Location and coordinates	Date	Artist / designer	Type	Material	Dimensions	Designation	Notes
More images	Playfair's Monument John Playfair	Calton Hill 55.9548°N 3.1830°W	1825–1826	William Henry Playfair	Square-plan Greek Revival Doric monument	Polished ashlar		Category A–listed	Incorporated in observatory compound wall
More images	Monument to Dugald Stewart	Calton Hill 55.9545°N 3.1845°W	1831	William Henry Playfair	Circular Greek Revival Corinthian monument	Polished ashlar		Category A–listed	Based on the Choragic Monument of Lysicrates in Athens.
More images	Monument to Robert Burns	Regent Road, Calton Hill 55.9535°N 3.1783°W	1831–1839	Thomas Hamilton	Circular Greek Revival Corinthian monument	Ashlar sandstone		Category A–listed	Based on the Choragic Monument of Lysicrates in Athens.
More images	Political Martyrs' Monument	Old Calton Cemetery 55.9534°N 3.1858°W	1844	Thomas Hamilton	Obelisk			Category A–listed (as part of Old Calton Burial Ground)	
More images	Scottish-American Soldiers' Monument	Old Calton Cemetery 55.9535°N 3.1861°W	1893	George Edwin Bissell	Statue with subsidiary sculpture	Bronze figures on red granite pedestal		Category A–listed (as part of Old Calton Burial Ground)	Includes a statue of Abraham Lincoln.
	Stones of Scotland Circle	Regent Road Park 55.9549°N 3.1745°W	2002	George Wyllie et al.	Circle of 32 stone slabs/rocks set in white stone chippings	Stone			Stones from each of Scotland's 32 local authorities; commemorates the re-establishment of the Scottish Parliament
	Holodomor Memorial Stone	Calton Hill, near Royal Terrace	2017		Memorial	Stone			Dedicated to the genocide by forced famine in Ukraine, 1932–1933

== Colinton ==
Image	Title / subject	Location and coordinates	Date	Artist / designer	Type	Material	Dimensions	Designation	Notes
More images	Covenanters' Memorial	Redford Road 55.90468°N 3.238737°W	Erected 1885. Stonework 1738	William Adam (architect of Old Royal Infirmary, 1738)	Commemorative column	Stone		Category B–listed	Column formed from 4 engaged Ionic columns from frontispiece of demolished Old Royal Infirmary.
	Memorial to Robert Louis Stevenson	Dell Road, Colinton 55.908597°N 3.256297°W	2013	Alan Herriot	Statue	Bronze		—N/a	
	Memorial to Army pipers killed in conflict	Army School of Bagpipe Music and Highland Drumming, Redford Barracks	2013	Alan Herriot	Statue	Bronze		—N/a	

== Corstorphine ==
Image	Title / subject	Location and coordinates	Date	Artist / designer	Type	Material	Dimensions	Designation	Notes
More images	Alan Breck Stewart and David Balfour, characters from Kidnapped	Corstorphine Road 55.94503°N 3.249841°W	2004	Alexander Stoddart	Statue pair	Bronze figures. Sandstone pedestal			Unveiled by Sir Sean Connery.
	Gencoo Penguin	Edinburgh Zoo							
	Statue of Nils Olav	Edinburgh Zoo							

== Craigentinny ==
Image	Title / subject	Location and coordinates	Date	Artist / designer	Type	Material	Dimensions	Designation	Notes
More images	Mausoleum of William Henry Miller	Craigentinny Crescent 55.9571°N 3.1372°W	1848–1856	David Rhind (architect); Alfred Gatley (reliefs)	Mausoleum with bas-relief sculpture			Category A–listed	

== Craigmillar ==
Image	Title / subject	Location and coordinates	Date	Artist / designer	Type	Material	Dimensions	Designation	Notes
	Memorial to Helen Crummy	Outside the East Neighbourhood Centre	2014	Tim Chalk				—N/a	Unveiled 21 March 2014 by Richard Demarco.

== Cramond ==
Image	Title / subject	Location and coordinates	Date	Artist / designer	Type	Material	Dimensions	Designation	Notes
	The Cramond Fish	Cramond Beach 55.979722°N 3.294227°W	2009	Ronald Rae	Sculpture	Pink Corrennie granite			Carved at Cramond Kirk, bought by Cramond community

== Inverleith ==
Image	Title / subject	Location and coordinates	Date	Artist / designer	Type	Material	Dimensions	Designation	Notes
More images	Monument to Carl Linnaeus	Chilean Area, Royal Botanic Garden 55.966842°N 3.207415°W	1778–1779	Robert Adam (architect)	Urn on pedestal			Category A–listed	
	Ascending Form (Gloria)	Royal Botanic Garden	1958	Barbara Hepworth	Sculpture	Bronze			
	Rock Form (Porthcurno)	Royal Botanic Garden	1964	Barbara Hepworth	Sculpture	Bronze			
	Umbra solis	Royal Botanic Garden	1975	Ian Hamilton Finlay and Michael Harvey	Sundial	Slate			
	Slate, Hole, Wall	Royal Botanic Garden	1990	Andy Goldsworthy (artist); Joe Smith (waller)	Sculpture	Cumbrian slate			
	Cone	Royal Botanic Garden	1990	Andy Goldsworthy	Sculpture	Ballachulish slate			
	Untitled	Royal Botanic Garden	1995	Alan Johnston	Sculpture				Made for the exhibition Haus Wittgenstein / Inverleith House.
	East Gates	Royal Botanic Garden	1996	Benjamin Tindall (architect); Alan Dawson (blacksmith)	Gates	Stainless steel			

== Leith ==
Image	Title / subject	Location and coordinates	Date	Artist / designer	Type	Material	Dimensions	Designation	Notes
More images	Statue of Robert Burns	Junction of Bernard Street and Constitution Street 55.9754°N 3.1668°W	1897–1901	David Watson Stevenson	Statue	Bronze (statue and reliefs), red granite and red sandstone (pedestal)		Category B–listed	Unveiled 15 October 1898; additional panels unveiled 7 March 1901.
More images	Statue of Queen Victoria	Foot of Leith Walk 55.9707°N 3.1717°W	1907	John Stevenson Rhind	Statue	Bronze (statue, reliefs and plaques), granite (pedestal)		Category B–listed	
	The Valour of German Culture, or the Kultur Panel	128 Pitt Street	1915	William Baxter	Relief	Terracotta		—N/a	Represents apparent German atrocities against Belgian civilians in World War I.
	Leith Mural	North Junction Street 55.9737°N 3.1775°W	1986	Tim Chalk and Paul Grime	Mural			—N/a	
	Statue of Sandy Irvine Robertson (1942–1999)	The Shore 55.9780°N 3.16933°W	1999	Lucy Poett	Statue sitting on bench	Bronze	Life-size	—N/a	
	6 Times (6th figure)	Ocean Terminal 55.9836°N 3.17636°W	2010	Antony Gormley	Statue	Cast iron		—N/a	
More images	Scottish Merchant Navy Memorial	Tower Place 55.97799°N 3.16898°W	2010	Jill Watson	Obelisk	Sandstone and bronze		—N/a	Unveiled 16 November 2010 by Princess Anne.

== New Town ==
Image	Title / subject	Location and coordinates	Date	Artist / designer	Type	Material	Dimensions	Designation	Notes
More images	Statue of John Hope, 4th Earl of Hopetoun	Forecourt of the Royal Bank of Scotland, St Andrew Square 55.9545°N 3.1917°W	1834	Thomas Campbell	Sculptural group (with horse)	Bronze group and pedestal on granite plinth		Category A–listed	Designed in 1829 as the centrepiece for Charlotte Square, but erected in 1834 at Dundas House.
More images	Monument to Henry Dundas, 1st Viscount Melville	St Andrew Square 55.9542°N 3.1932°W	1817–1823 (column); 1822–1827 (statue)	Robert Forrest after Sir Francis Leggatt Chantrey	Statue on Doric column	Bronze statue on cream sandstone column		Category A–listed	Architect: William Burn
More images	Statue of George IV	Junction of George Street and Hanover Street 55.9535°N 3.1973°W	1825–1831	Sir Francis Leggatt Chantrey	Statue	Bronze statue on ashlar pedestal		Category A–listed	Unveiled 26 November 1831. Commemorates George IV's visit to Edinburgh in 1822.
More images	Statue of William Pitt the Younger	Junction of George Street and Frederick Street 55.953°N 3.2004°W	1831–1833	Sir Francis Leggatt Chantrey	Statue	Bronze statue on ashlar pedestal		Category A–listed	
More images	Memorial to Albert, Prince Consort	Charlotte Square 55.9518°N 3.2077°W	1862–1876	Sir John Steell et al.	Equestrian statue with other sculptures	Bronze (statues and reliefs); Peterhead granite (pedestal)		Category A–listed	Architect: David Bryce.
More images	Monument to Catherine Sinclair	Corner of North Charlotte Street / St Colme Street 55.9532°N 3.2076°W	1866–1868	John Rhind	Gothic monument, Eleanor cross type	Cream sandstone		Category A–listed	Architect: David Bryce.
More images	Statue of Thomas Chalmers	Junction of George Street and Castle Street 55.9525°N 3.2035°W	1869–1878	Sir John Steell	Statue	Bronze statue on polished red granite pedestal		Category A–listed	
More images	King's Own Scottish Borderers Memorial	North Bridge 55.9517°N 3.1881°W	1906	William Birnie Rhind	Sculptural group	Stone		Category A–listed	
More images	The Manuscript of Monte Cassino	Broughton Street	1991	Eduardo Paolozzi	Three-part sculpture	Bronze		—N/a	Outside St Mary's Metropolitan Cathedral.
More images	Memorial to Sir Arthur Conan Doyle	Picardy Place 55.956837°N 3.18675°W	1991	Gerald Ogilvie Laing	Statue (of Sherlock Holmes)	Bronze statue on ashlar pedestal		—N/a	Erected by the Federation of Master Builders to mark its 50th anniversary.
More images	Horse~Rider~Eagle	Silvermills 55.959410°N 3.204204°W	1996	Eoghan Bridge	Equestrian statue	Bronze		—N/a	Commission by Cala Homes for a housing development ceremonially opened by the actor Robert Hardy in April 1997.
More images	Dreaming Spires	Outside the Omni Centre, Greenside Place, Leith Walk 55.956344°N 3.186225°W	2005	Helen Denerley	Statues of giraffes	Recycled metal, painted		—N/a	Unveiled 27 July 2005 by Julian Spalding. Includes quotation from the South African poet Roy Campbell at its base.
More images	Lion of Scotland	St Andrew Square 55.954623°N 3.193084°W	2006	Ronald Rae	Sculpture	Pink Corrennie granite		—N/a	Originally sited in Holyrood Park; moved to current location in 2010.
More images	Statue of James Clerk Maxwell	George Street 55.954053°N 3.194381°W	2006–2008	Alexander Stoddart	Statue	Bronze statue and reliefs on ashlar pedestal		—N/a	Unveiled 25 November 2008.

== Niddrie ==
Image	Title / subject	Location and coordinates	Date	Artist / designer	Type	Material	Dimensions	Designation	Notes
	Gulliver in Edinburgh			Jimmy Boyle	Land art				Demolished in 2011 to make way for flood defences.

== Old Town ==
Image	Title / subject	Location and coordinates	Date	Artist / designer	Type	Material	Dimensions	Designation	Notes
More images	Statue of Charles II	Parliament Square 55.9492°N 3.1905°W	1685	Workshop of Grinling Gibbons	Equestrian statue	Lead statue on ashlar pedestal		Category A–listed	The pedestal is an 1835 replica of Robert Mylne's original.
More images	Alexander and Bucephalus	Courtyard of City Chambers, High Street 55.9501°N 3.1903°W	1829–1833 (cast 1883)	Sir John Steell	Sculptural group	Bronze group on ashlar pedestal		Category A–listed	Unveiled 18 April 1884. Moved from St Andrew Square in 1916.
More images	Statue of Prince Frederick, Duke of York and Albany	Edinburgh Castle Esplanade 55.9489°N 3.1979°W	1837	Thomas Campbell	Statue	Bronze (statue and pedestal)		Category B–listed. Part of Esplanade Category A–listed group.	
More images	78th Highlanders Memorial	Edinburgh Castle Esplanade 55.9490°N 3.1969°W	1861	S. Hunter (carver); Messrs Sutherland (masonic work)	Celtic cross	Dark stone		Category B–listed. Part of Esplanade Category A–listed group.	Sir Robert Rowand Anderson (architect)
More images	Greyfriars Bobby Fountain	Junction of George IV Bridge and Candlemaker Row, near Greyfriars Kirk 55.9469°N 3.1913°W	1873	William Brodie	Drinking fountain with statuette	Bronze (statuette and plaques); red granite (plinth and basins)		Category A–listed	
More images	Monument to Colonel Kenneth Mackenzie	Edinburgh Castle Esplanade 55.9489°N 3.1974°W	1875	Sir John Steell	Celtic cross	Dark stone cross on rubble plinth with red granite plaque		Category B–listed. Part of Esplanade Category A–listed group.	
More images	Fame (or Nike), Prosperity and Plenty	Bank of Scotland, Bank Street	c. 1878	Attributed to John Rhind	Architectural sculpture			Category A–listed	
	72nd Highlanders Memorial	Edinburgh Castle Esplanade 55.9489°N 3.1981°W	1882–1883	MacDonald, Field & Co.	Obelisk	Pink Peterhead granite and bronze		Category C(S)–listed. Part of Esplanade Category A–listed group.	
More images	Mercat Cross	Parliament Square 55.9497°N 3.1902°W	1885	Sydney Mitchell and George Arthur (architects); John Rhind (sculptor)	Mercat cross	Hermand sandstone		Category A–listed	
More images	Queensberry Memorial Walter Montagu Douglas Scott, 5th Duke of Buccleuch	West Parliament Square 55.9495°N 3.1917°W	1885–1888	Sir Joseph Edgar Boehm	Statue	Bronze statue on hexagonal stone pedestal with three tiers of bronze decoration		Category A–listed	Architect: Sir Robert Rowand Anderson
More images	Statue of William Chambers	Chambers Street 55.94738°N 3.18979°W	1888–1891	John Rhind or William Birnie Rhind	Statue	Bronze (statue and reliefs), red sandstone (pedestal)		Category B–listed	Architect: Hippolyte Blanc
More images	Witches' Well Women accused of witchcraft executed nearby	Castlehill 55.94890°N 3.19643°W	1894	John Duncan	Memorial drinking fountain with plaque	Bronze ?			
More images	Statue of John Knox	New College Quadrangle 55.9496°N 3.1951°W	1896	John Hutchison	Statue	Bronze (statue), red sandstone (pedestal)		Category C(S)–listed	
More images	Scottish Horse Boer War Memorial	Edinburgh Castle Esplanade 55.9489°N 3.1974°W	1905–1910	Stewart McGlashan and Son	Celtic cross	Pink granite		Category C(S)–listed. Part of Esplanade Category A–listed group.	
More images	Black Watch Boer War Memorial	The Mound, corner of Market Street and North Bank Street 55.9501°N 3.1945°W	1908–1910	William Birnie Rhind	Statue	Bronze (statue and relief), red granite (pedestal)		Category A–listed	
	Statue of Edward VII	Holyrood Palace forecourt 55.9529°N 3.1736°W	1922	Henry Snell Gamley	Statue	Bronze statue on stone pedestal		Part of Category A–listed group	
More images	Statue of Field Marshal Douglas Haig, 1st Earl Haig	Hospital Square, Edinburgh Castle 55.948862°N 3.201779°W	1923	George Edward Wade	Equestrian statue	Bronze statue on rubble stone plinth		Category B–listed	Moved from Castle Esplanade 2011
More images	Statue of Robert the Bruce	Edinburgh Castle Gatehouse 55.948551°N 3.198598°W	1929	Thomas John Clapperton	Statue in niche	Bronze		Category A–listed (with gatehouse)	Erected to commemorate the 600th anniversary of the Bruce's death. Architect of the niche: Sir Robert Lorimer.
More images	Statue of William Wallace	Edinburgh Castle Gatehouse 55.948577°N 3.198598°W	1929	Alexander Carrick	Statue in niche	Bronze		Category A–listed (with gatehouse)	Architect of the niche: Sir Robert Lorimer
More images	Covenanters' Memorial	Grassmarket 55.947827°N 3.194772°W	1937		Raised circle in pavement	Red and grey granite setts		Category C(S)–listed	
More images	Statue of David Hume	Outside Court House, Lawnmarket, Royal Mile 55.94956°N 3.192625°W	1995–1997	Alexander Stoddart	Statue	Bronze		—N/a	
More images	Memorial to Susannah Alice Stephen	James' Court, off Lawnmarket (Royal Mile) 55.949548°N 3.19422°W	2000	Frances Pelly	Sculpture on stepped plinth	Bronze		—N/a	
More images	Statue of Adam Smith	outside St Giles' Cathedral 55.949764°N 3.190069°W	2003–2008	Alexander Stoddart	Statue	Bronze		—N/a	
More images	Statue of Robert Fergusson	outside the Kirk of the Canongate 55.951574°N 3.179363°W	2004	David Annand	Statue	Bronze		—N/a	
More images	Statue of James Braidwood	Parliament Square 55.949495°N 3.190013°W	2006–2008	Kenny Mackay	Statue	Bronze		—N/a	
More images	Work No. 1059	The Scotsman Steps 55.951215°N 3.188660°W	2011	Martin Creed	Installation	Marble		—N/a	Commissioned by The Fruitmarket Gallery.
More images	Statue of William Henry Playfair	Chambers Street 55.94757°N 3.18893°W	2016	Alexander Stoddart	Statue	Bronze		—N/a	

== Portobello ==
Image	Title / subject	Location and coordinates	Date	Artist / designer	Type	Material	Dimensions	Designation	Notes
More images	Coade Stone Pillars	Portobello Promenade							

== Princes Street ==
Image	Title / subject	Location and coordinates	Date	Artist / designer	Type	Material	Dimensions	Designation	Notes
More images	Statue of Sir Walter Scott	Scott Monument, East Princes Street Gardens 55.952399°N 3.193304°W	1848 (installed)	Sir John Steell	Statue	Carrara marble		Category A–listed	Architect: George Meikle Kemp.
More images	Statue of Arthur Wellesley, 1st Duke of Wellington	General Register House, Princes Street 55.9535°N 3.1892°W	1848–1852	Sir John Steell	Equestrian statue	Bronze (statue); red Aberdeen granite (pedestal)		Category A–listed	Architects: David Bryce and James Gowans.
More images	Statue of Allan Ramsay	West Princes Street Gardens 55.9517°N 3.1973°W	1850	Sir John Steell	Statue	Carrara marble		Category A–listed	Architect: David Bryce (1865).
More images	The Genius of Architecture Crowning the Theory and Practice of Art	West Princes Street Gardens 55.9510°N 3.1983°W	1862	William Brodie	Sculptural group	Marble		Category B–listed	
More images	Ross Fountain	West Princes Street Gardens 55.95005°N 3.202994°W	1862–1872	Jean-Baptiste Klagmann	Fountain with sculptures	Gilt cast iron		Category A–listed	Architects: Peddie and Kinnear.
More images	Statue of John Wilson	East Princes Street Gardens 55.9521°N 3.1951°W	1863–1865	Sir John Steell	Statue	Bronze statue on ashlar plinth		Category A–listed	Architect: David Bryce.
More images	Statue of David Livingstone	East Princes Street Gardens 55.9525°N 3.1927°W	1875–1876	Amelia Robertson Hill	Statue	Bronze statue on stone plinth		Category A–listed	
More images	Statue of Adam Black	East Princes Street Gardens 55.9522°N 3.1944°W	1876–1877	John Hutchison	Statue	Bronze		Category A–listed	
More images	Statue of Sir James Young Simpson	West Princes Street Gardens 55.9504°N 3.2050°W	1877	William Brodie	Statue	Bronze		Category B–listed	
More images	Memorial to Dean Edward Bannerman Ramsay	West Princes Street Gardens, behind the church of St John the Evangelist 55.950264°N 3.205931°W	1877–1879	Robert Rowand Anderson	Celtic cross	Granite with bronze reliefs		Category A–listed (with church)	
More images	Royal Scots Greys Memorial	West Princes Street Gardens 55.9514°N 3.1994°W	1906	William Birnie Rhind	Equestrian statue	Bronze statue on rock plinth		Category B–listed	Unveiled 16 November 1906 by the Earl of Rosebery.
More images	Statue of Thomas Guthrie	West Princes Street Gardens 55.9508°N 3.2026°W	1907–1910	Frederick William Pomeroy	Statue	Portland stone statue and pedestal		Category B–listed	
More images	Scottish American Memorial	West Princes Street Gardens 55.950556°N 3.201944°W	1923–1927	Robert Tait McKenzie	Screen with relief and statue in front	Stone (screen and pedestal), bronze (reliefs and statue)		Category B–listed	Unveiled 7 September 1927. Architect: Reginald Fairlie.
More images	Royal Scots Memorial	West Princes Street Gardens 55.9511°N 3.1973°W	1948–1952	Sir Frank Charles Mears et al.	Enclosure of standing stones	Stone with bronze plaques		Category B–listed	Unveiled 26 July 1952 by Princess Mary, Colonel in Chief of the Regiment.
More images	Norwegian War Memorial	West Princes Street Gardens 55.9502°N 3.2021°W	1978		Commemorative stone mounted on three smaller stones			—N/a	
	Memorial to Robert Louis Stevenson	West Princes Street Gardens 55.9500°N 3.2023°W	1987–1989	Ian Hamilton Finlay	Standing stone set in a grove of birch trees	Flagstone		Category A–listed	Unveiled 14 July 1989 by Dame Muriel Spark.
	Spanish Brigade Memorial	East Princes Street Gardens	1988		Commemorative stone			—N/a	
More images	Bum the Dog (of San Diego)	West Princes Street Gardens, King's Stables Road Entrance 55.948417°N 3.203388°W	2008	Jessica McCain	Statue	Bronze		—N/a	Presented by the San Diego–Edinburgh Sister City Society
More images	Wojtek (Voytek), the Soldier Bear	West Princes Street Gardens 55.950833°N 3.202028°W	2015	Alan Herriot	Sculptural group	Bronze on granite base		—N/a	
	Lulla-Bye (Children's Memorial)	West Princes Street Gardens 55.950939°N 3.198579°W	2019	Andy Scott	Sculpture	Bronze	8ft (2.4m)	—N/a	Cast by Powderhall Bronze; gifted by the City of Edinburgh Council.
	Royal Regiment of Scotland Memorial	West Princes Street Gardens 55.9503045°N 3.2022685°W	2026	Kenny Hunter	Statue	Bronze		—N/a	Unveiled 1 July 2026 by Charles III.

== Riccarton ==
Image	Title / subject	Location and coordinates	Date	Artist / designer	Type	Material	Dimensions	Designation	Notes
	Statue of James Watt	Heriot Watt Campus 55.90930°N 3.32003°W	1854	Peter Slater after Sir Francis Chantrey	Statue	Bronze			Moved from Chambers Street, Edinburgh

== South Gyle ==
Image	Title / subject	Location and coordinates	Date	Artist / designer	Type	Material	Dimensions	Designation	Notes
	The Wealth of Nations	Redheughs Avenue	1993	Eduardo Paolozzi	Sculpture	Cast metal			Features a quotation from Albert Einstein
	Pigeon	South Gyle Crescent			Statue	Cast metal			
	Seagull	South Gyle Crescent			Sculpture	Cast metal			
	Bird	South Gyle Crescent			Sculpture	Cast metal			
	Concrete Jungle	Gyle Centre	1994	Alan Watson	Sculpture	Concrete			
	Stacked Shades	Gyle Centre	1994	Marion Smith	Sculpture				
	Figure in a Landscape	Gyle Centre	1994	Sylvia Stewart	Sculpture				Information plaque missing
	Veil	Gyle Centre	1994	Jake Kempsall	Sculpture				
	Fossil Tree	Gyle Centre	1994	Bill Scott	Sculpture				
	Figure in a Landscape	Gyle Centre	1990s	Ian Hamilton Finlay	Sculpture				Arcade of pillars
	Scottish Writers	Edinburgh Park	1990s	various	Herms				12 herms of Scottish poets

== Southside ==
Image	Title / subject	Location and coordinates	Date	Artist / designer	Type	Material	Dimensions	Designation	Notes
	Runestone U 1173	Adjacent to 50 George Square 55.9409°N 3.1866°W	c. 1010–1050	?	Runestone	Granite			Originally from Uppland, Sweden, the stone was presented to the Society of Antiquaries of Scotland in 1787.
More images	Middle Meadow Walk Gatepiers	Lauriston Place 55.9453°N 3.1911°W	1840s	George Smith (pillars); Alexander Handyside Ritchie (unicorns)	Pair of octagonal gatepiers (pillars) surmounted by unicorns	Stone		Category B–listed	
	Statue of David Brewster	Opposite Joseph Black building, at King's Buildings Campus 55.921773°N 3.1717604°W	1877	William Brodie	Sculpture		55.9242226°N 3.1762067°W	—N/a	
	Melville Drive (east end) Ornamental Pillars	Melville Drive (east end) 55.9403°N 3.1833°W	1880	John Lessels	Pair of square pillars surmounted by heraldic beasts – lion on N, unicorn on S	Polished ashlar		Category B–listed	Presented to the City by the printing and publishing firm of Thomas Nelson and Sons.
	Memorial to Archbishop Archibald Tait	Old Medical School, Teviot Place 55.944818°N 3.19043°W	1884–1885	Mario Raggi	Bust in columned niche	Bronze		Category A–listed (with Old Medical School)	Unveiled 27 February 1885. Marks the site of Tait's birthplace.
More images	Brass Founders' Pillar	Nicolson Square 55.9460°N 3.1854°W	1886	Sir James Gowans (column); John Stevenson Rhind (statuette)	Statuette on pillar	Bronze statuette and column on granite base		Category B–listed	Commissioned for the Edinburgh International Exhibition of 1886, where it won a gold medal
	Masons' Pillars	Melville Drive (west end) 55.9420°N 3.2003°W	1886	Sir James Gowans	Pair of octagonal pillars, surmounted by unicorns	Stone (from 17 different quarries)		Category B–listed. Part of B group with Sundial	Erected by the Master Builders and Operative Masons of Edinburgh and Leith as a permanent memento of the Edinburgh International Exhibition.
	Prince Albert Victor Sundial	West Meadows Park 55.9418°N 3.1988°W	1886	Sir James Gowans	Sundial. Octagonal shaft with bronze armillary sphere	Stone (from 10 different quarries)		Category B–listed. Part of B group with Masons' Pillars	Erected in commemoration of the opening of the Edinburgh International Exhibition on 6 May 1886 by Prince Albert Victor.
More images	McEwan Lantern Pillar	Bristo Square 55.945346°N 3.188812°W	c. 1890	Robert Rowand Anderson (architect)	Tapering tower with relief carving and lamp	Portland stone and cast iron		Category B–listed. Part of A group with McEwan Hall	
More images	Rhinoceros head Jim Haynes	Informatics Forum, Charles Street	2012 (unveiled)	William Darrell	Architectural sculpture	Bronze		—N/a	
	The Haynes Nano-stage Jim Haynes	Informatics Forum, corner of Crichton Street and Charles Street	2012 (unveiled)	David Forsyth	Sculpture	Stainless steel		—N/a	
More images	Egeria	Originally outside the Michael Swann building; now outside Murray library at King's Buildings Campus 55.922594°N 3.175131°W	12 March 1997 (unveiled)	Eduardo Paolozzi	Sculpture	Bronze		—N/a	Statues removed in March 2017 from the Swann building. Relocated, following conservation, in May 2017 to Murray library at King's Buildings.
	Parthenope	Outside Murray library at King's Buildings Campus 55.922594°N 3.175131°W	12 March 1997 (unveiled)	Eduardo Paolozzi	Sculpture	Bronze		—N/a	
	The Dreamer Memorial to Dr. Winifred Rushforth, OBE	George Square Gardens	1997	Chris Hall		Stone		—N/a	Unveiled by Prince Charles
	Your Next Breath	Royal College of Surgeons of Edinburgh 55.94666°N 3.18482°W	2022	Kenny Hunter	Sculpture	Bronze		—N/a	Dedicated to NHS workers in the COVID-19 pandemic. Received the 2023 Marsh Award for Excellence in Public Sculpture.

== Stockbridge ==
Image	Title / subject	Location and coordinates	Date	Artist / designer	Type	Material	Dimensions	Designation	Notes
More images	Hygeia	St Bernard's Well 55.9553°N 3.2115°W	1888	David Watson Stevenson	Statue			Category A–listed	

== Trinity ==
Image	Title / subject	Location and coordinates	Date	Artist / designer	Type	Material	Dimensions	Designation	Notes
More images	Statue of Edward VII	Victoria Park, Newhaven Road 55.9752°N 3.1910°W	1914	John Stevenson Rhind	Statue	Bronze (statue); stone (pedestal)		Category B–listed	Erected by Leith Town Council.

== West End ==
Image	Title / subject	Location and coordinates	Date	Artist / designer	Type	Material	Dimensions	Designation	Notes
More images	Statue of Robert Dundas, 2nd Viscount Melville	Melville Crescent 55.9497°N 3.2139°W	1857	Sir John Steell	Statue	Bronze statue on sandstone pedestal		Category A–listed	
More images	Memorial to William Ewart Gladstone	Coates Crescent Gardens 55.9485°N 3.2123°W	1902–1916	James Pittendrigh Macgillivray	Statue with other sculptures	Bronze statues on granite pedestals		Category A–listed	Unveiled 18 January 1917 at St Andrew Square by the Earl of Rosebery. Moved to this, its original intended location, in 1955.
More images	Woman and Child	Festival Square, Lothian Road 55.9469°N 3.2062°W	1985–1986	Anne Davidson	Sculptural group	Bronze		—N/a	Unveiled 22 July 1986 by Suganya Chetty. Dedicated to "all those killed or imprisoned for their stand against apartheid".
More images	First Conundrum	Festival Square, Lothian Road 55.947049°N 3.206943°W		Remco de Fouw	Sculptural group	Stone		—N/a	
More images	Horse & Rider	Rutland Court 55.948145°N 3.208686°W	1993	Eoghan Bridge	Equestrian statue	Bronze		—N/a	Commission by Baillie Gifford as part of a percent for art scheme.

=== Scottish National Gallery of Modern Art ===
Image	Title / subject	Location and coordinates	Date	Artist / designer	Type	Material	Dimensions	Designation	Notes
	La Vierge d'Alsace (The Virgin of Alsace)	Scottish National Gallery of Modern Art Two	1919–1921	Antoine Bourdelle	Statue	Bronze		—N/a	
More images	Reclining Figure	Scottish National Gallery of Modern Art One	1951	Henry Moore	Sculpture	Bronze (sculpture and pedestal)		—N/a	
More images	Master of the Universe	Scottish National Gallery of Modern Art Two	1989	Eduardo Paolozzi	Sculpture	Bronze		—N/a	
More images	Landform	Scottish National Gallery of Modern Art One	2001	Charles Jencks	Land art			—N/a	
	Macduff Circle	Scottish National Gallery of Modern Art Two	2002	Richard Long	Land art	Slate		—N/a	
	6 Times (1st figure)	Scottish National Gallery of Modern Art One	2010	Antony Gormley	Statue			—N/a	One of six figures along the Water of Leith
