= The Ross Development Trust =

The Ross Development Trust (RDT) was a Scottish Charitable Incorporated Organisation (SCIO) established to refurbish West Princes Street Gardens, Edinburgh. Their declared mission was "to create a unique, internationally recognisable venue for all to enjoy, in an attractive and reanimated West Princes Street Gardens, as a year round, socially inclusive centre promoting a diversity of cultural activities."

== Redevelopment of West Princes Street Gardens ==
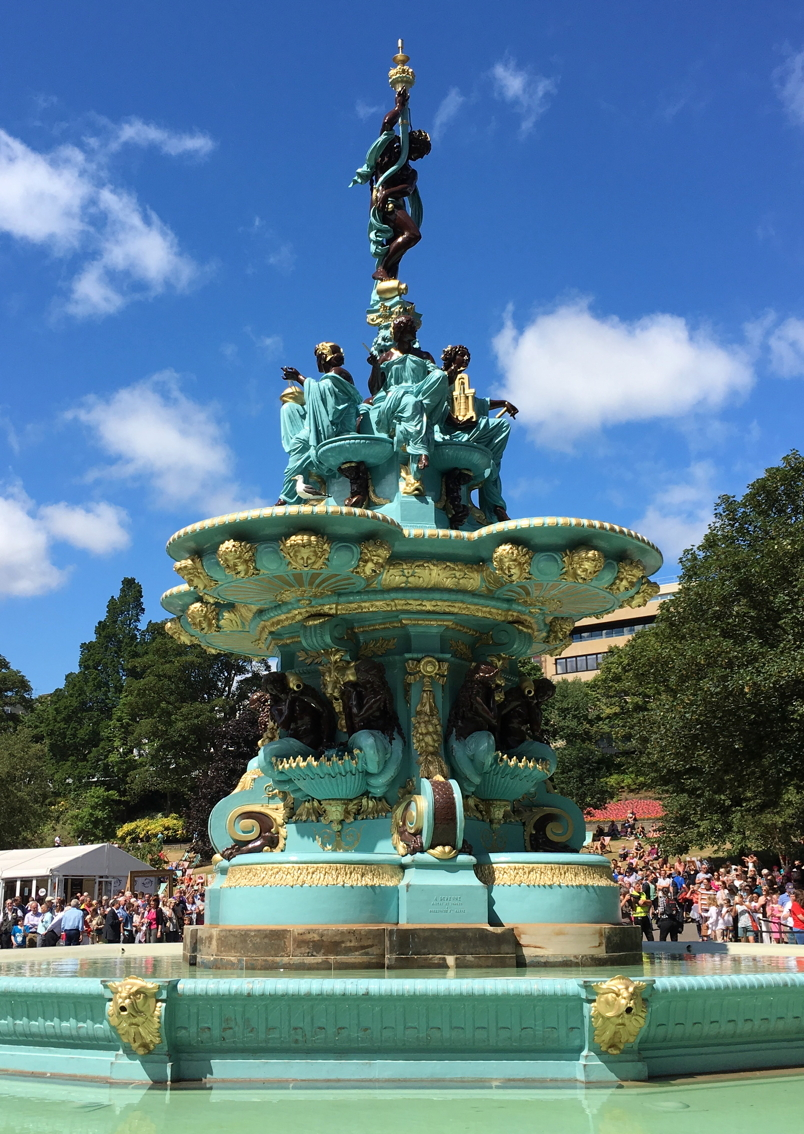
The newly-restored Ross Fountain

The Ross Development Trust SC046873 were registered in September 2016, after making a development agreement with the City of Edinburgh in June of that year. They organized the restoration of the Ross Fountain in 2018, and were also responsible for the upgrading of the West Princes Gardens Gardener's Cottage.

Following an international design competition, launched in February 2017, they were involved in plans for the redevelopment of the Ross Bandstand and a completely new Visitor Centre, subject to a public consultation by the City of Edinburgh, closing on 14 September 2018, and amendment of the 1991 City of Edinburgh District Council Order Confirmation Act which imposed limits on buildings in public parks.

The Chairman of the RDT was Norman Springford of Apex Hotels and the Managing Director was David Ellis.

== See also ==
- Princes Street Gardens
