= Norman Springford =

Scottish businessperson (born 1944)

Norman Springford OBE (born December 1944) is the former chairman of The Ross Development Trust and former Executive Chairman of Apex Hotels.

An accountant by profession, Norman Springford, worked for the Inland Revenue and then became the owner/manager of a number of public houses, bingo halls, and the Edinburgh Playhouse.

He opened his first hotel, the Apex International Hotel, in Edinburgh in 1996. The group now own ten hotels across London, Edinburgh, Glasgow, Dundee and Bath. In 2014 relinquished his position as chairman of the company, handing over to his son Ian.

In 2011 he was credited with saving the Princes Street Gardens ice rink. In June 2018, he was awarded the OBE for services to the Scottish tourism industry.
