= Ronald Rae =

Scottish sculptor

Ronald Rae is a sculptor and graphic artist born in Ayr, Scotland, in 1946. His large-scale granite sculptures are entirely hand-carved, and over the course of 58 years, he has carved 58 monoliths, many of which are in public and private collections throughout the UK, with one placed in the USA. Rae's sculpture exhibitions include Regent's Park, London (1999–2002), the Yorkshire Sculpture Park, Wakefield (2002–04), and Holyrood Park, Edinburgh (2006–08). Rae is a Fellow of the Royal Society of Sculptors.

In addition to his work in sculpting, Rae has created a vast body of graphic fine art, small sculptures, and 'found objects'. Exhibitions of his work have been held at the Maclaurin Gallery, the Ruiz Gallery in Chicago, Rozelle House, Cyril Gerber Fine Art, The Compass Gallery, Netherbow Gallery, 369 Gallery and the Graves Art Gallery in Sheffield. One of Rae's inscribed books, Hans Christian Andersen's 'Sagor', is in the permanent collection of the National Galleries Scotland. Rozelle House, The MacLaurin Gallery and Edinburgh City Art Centre also hold examples of his work.

Although a controversial figure at times for contesting with the art establishment over his Lion of Scotland, and having avoided formal education and any contact with the Royal Academies, Rae has attracted considerable praise for his expressionist and mythological works, with accolades from Cyril Gerber, David Alston and Stewart Conn.

An artist monograph, 'Ronald Rae - An Inner Life', was published by Unicorn Publishing Group in November 2023. A major joint retrospective of Rae's work, together with that of his artist friend Gordon Cockburn, opened at Rozelle House in Ayr on 17 November 2023 and toured on to Gracefield Arts Centre in Dumfries, then to the Baird Institute in Cumnock. A catalogue will was published for the exhibition.

== Sculptures on Public Display ==
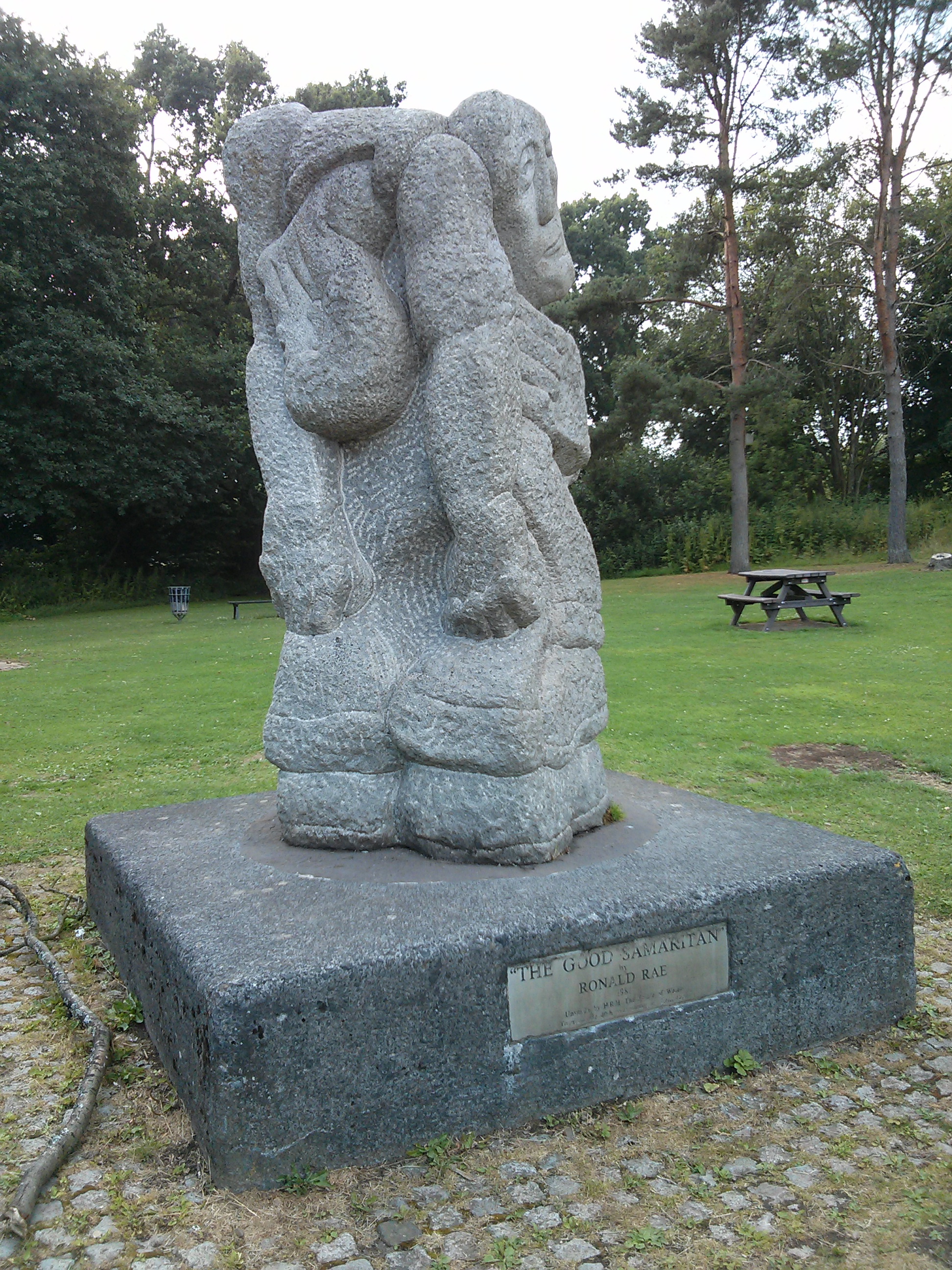
The Good Samaritan at Riverside Park, Glenrothes

Rae's early religious cycle of five large granite sculptures, The Tragic Sacrifice of Christ, is in the collection of South Ayrshire Council. This group was unveiled by George Younger, Scottish Secretary, in 1979, at the same time as the Henry Moore 'Reclining figure' which South Ayrshire Council had purchased.

In April 2009, Rae's eight-tonne sculpture Fish was installed on the waterfront at Cramond after a successful fundraising campaign by the Cramond Community. The sculpture was carved from a 460 million-year-old granite stone in the grounds of Cramond Kirk over a period of eight months.

In February 2008, the sculpture Fallen Christ was sited outside the MacLeod Centre on the island of Iona and dedicated to the memory of Jim Hughes a member of the Iona Community.

Rae's largest work, The Lion of Scotland, is sited at St Andrew Square in Edinburgh.

Other granite sculptures in public sites include O Wert Thou in the Cauld Blast at Milton Keynes railway station, and Abraham at the Royal Edinburgh Hospital, Return of the Prodigal at Aviva, Perth, Famine and Mark of the Nail at St John's Church, Edinburgh, The Good Samaritan at Riverside Park, Glenrothes, Sheep at Almond Valley Heritage Centre, Livingston, Sacred Cow at Victoria Quays, Sheffield, Insect and Celtic Cross at Erdington railway station, Birmingham, Hiroshima Departed at the Japanese Peace Park, Willen Lake, Milton Keynes, War Veteran and Animals in War Memorial, The Cramond Fish at Cramond Waterfront, Edinburgh, and Baby Boar at Aberdeen Airport. A group of 12 granite sculptures is on public display at Creetown Whisky Bond.

Other sculptures on public display, include:

- War Veteran, Kemnay Granite, 1.5x1.5x0.9m, 1997, location: Campbell Park, Milton Keynes
- Animals in War Memorial, Granite, 1.5x3.4x0.9m, 1998, location: Campbell Park, Milton Keynes
- St Francis, Tillyfourie Granite & Basalt, 1.5 x 3.4 x 0.9m, 2015, location: Threave Gardens, The National Trust for Scotland
- Insect and Celtic Cross, Granite, 1.5x1.8x1m, 1992, location: Erdington railway station, Birmingham

== Portraits of Rae ==
Ronald Rae agreed to sit for sculptor Jon Edgar in 2011 as part of a new series of sculpture-related heads. This was exhibited at Yorkshire Sculpture Park in 2013 as part of the Sculpture Series Heads exhibition. Rae has also been photographed by celebrated portraitist Anne-Katrin Purkiss, and these have been archived with the National Portrait Gallery and appear in her book containing a photographic record of British Sculptors.
