= Edinburgh's Runestone =

Swedish runestone in Edinburgh, Scotland

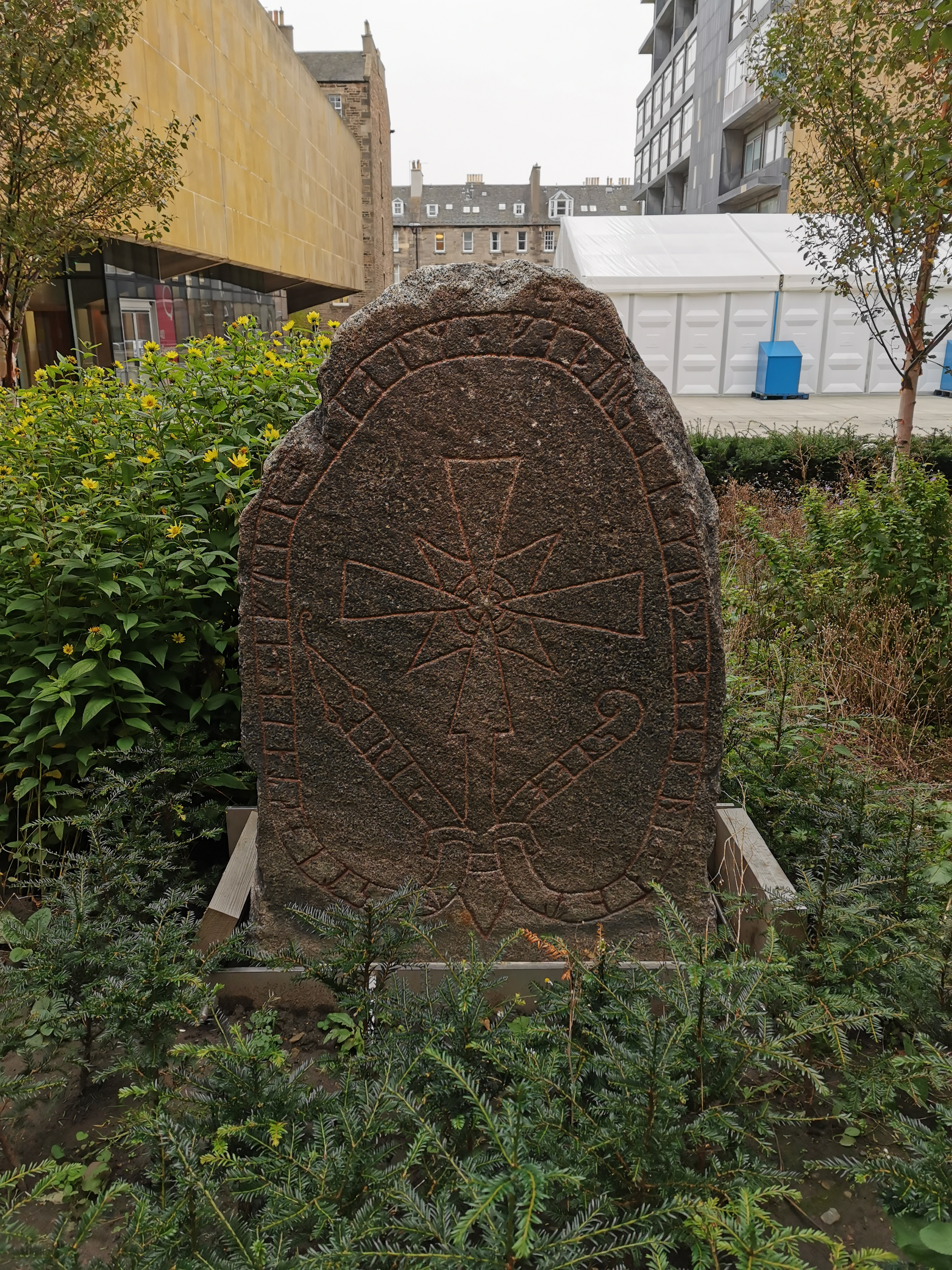
- "Princes Street Gardens" runestone
- Created: 1010–1050
- Discovered: Lilla Ramsjö, Morgongåva, Vittinge parish, Uppland, Sweden
- Present location: 50 George Square, Edinburgh, Scotland
- Coordinates: 55.943863°N 3.186608°W
- Rundata ID: U 1173
- Runemaster: Erik (A)

Text – Native
- Old Norse: Ari ræisti stæin æftiR Hialm, faður sinn. Guð hialpi and hans.

Translation
- Ari raised the stone in memory of Hjalmr, his father. May God help his spirit.

The Swedish Runestone, designated U 1173 in the Rundata catalogue, is an 11th-century Swedish Viking Age runestone which was located in Princes Street Gardens, Edinburgh, below Edinburgh Castle Esplanade, within a fenced enclosure adjacent to Ramsay Garden. Due to security concerns it was removed from there on 19 December 2017 and in the Autumn of 2020 was re-located at 50 George Square, Edinburgh just outside the University of Edinburgh's Department of Scandinavian Studies.

On 22 March 2023 the runestone was officially unveiled, after delays due to restrictions put in place to prevent the spread of COVID-19.

Originally from Lilla Ramsjö in present-day Morgongåva, Heby Municipality, it was donated to the Society of Antiquaries of Scotland in 1787 by Sir Alexander Seton of Preston and Ekolsund (né Baron 1738–1814), and was presented to the Princes Street Proprietors by the Society in 1821. It is one of three Swedish runestones in Britain; the other two (U 104 & U 1160) are in the Ashmolean Museum, Oxford in England.

== Carving ==
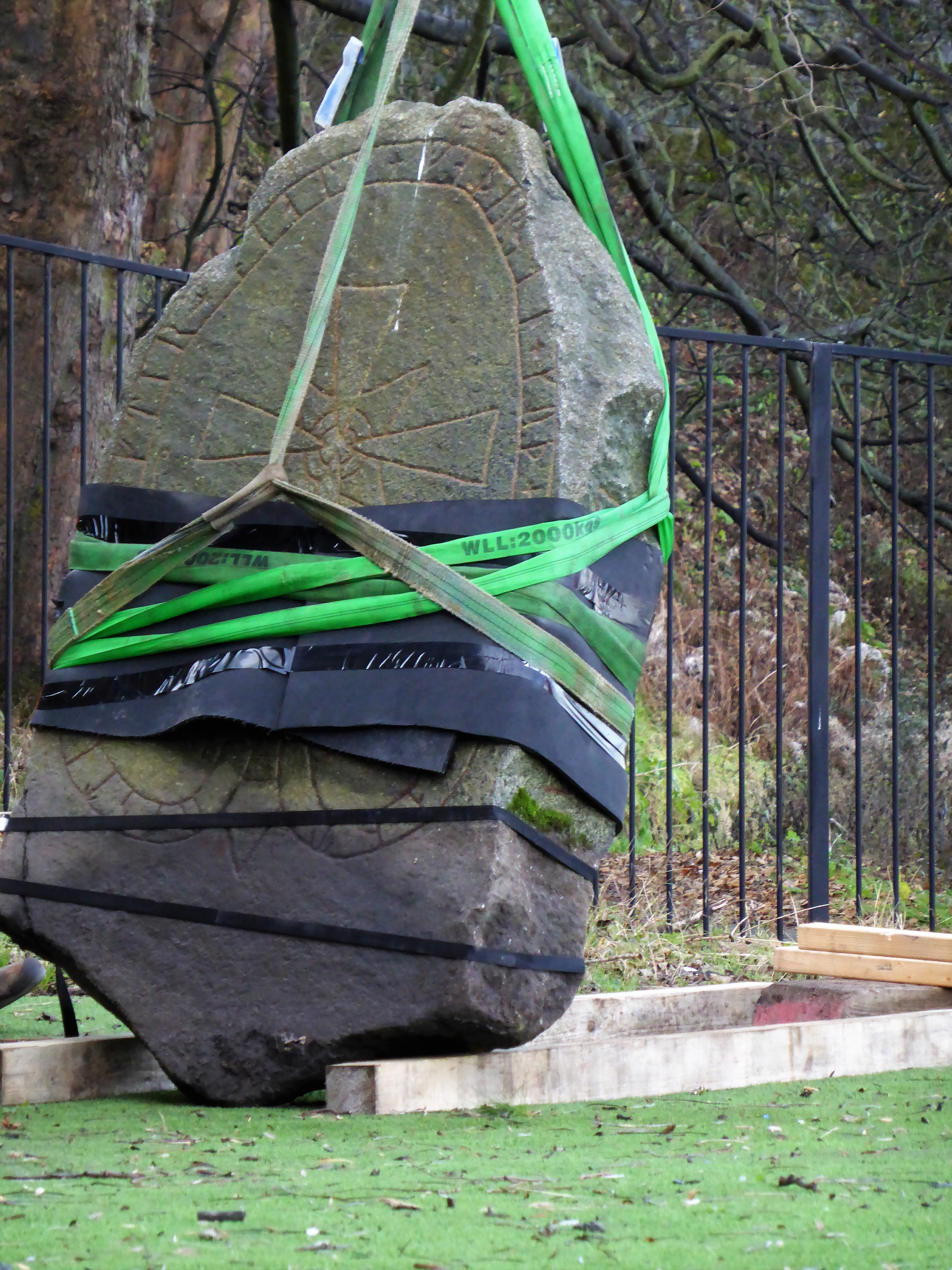

The carving on the stone features a centrally located cross, encircled by a serpent. The runic inscription is carved within the serpent, whose head and tail are linked with the cross' shaft. There are 18 runestones in Sweden which bear similar features and are believed to have been carved by a runemaster called Erik.

There are two additional crosses carved into the runestone – one on the right-hand edge of the stone, and one at the front of the stone, above the inscription, on the right-hand side. They do not exhibit the same level of craftsmanship and are believed to have been added later, perhaps in the 19th century.

=== Inscription ===
Transliteration and transcription:

ari + rasti + stain + aftir + (h)ialm + faþur sin + kuþ + hialbi + ant hans
Ari {} reisti {} stein {} eptir {} Hjalm, {} fǫður sinn. {} Guð {} hjalpi {} ǫnd hans.
"Ari raised the stone in memory of Hjalmr, his father. May God help his spirit."

== Replica Runestone in Morgongåva ==
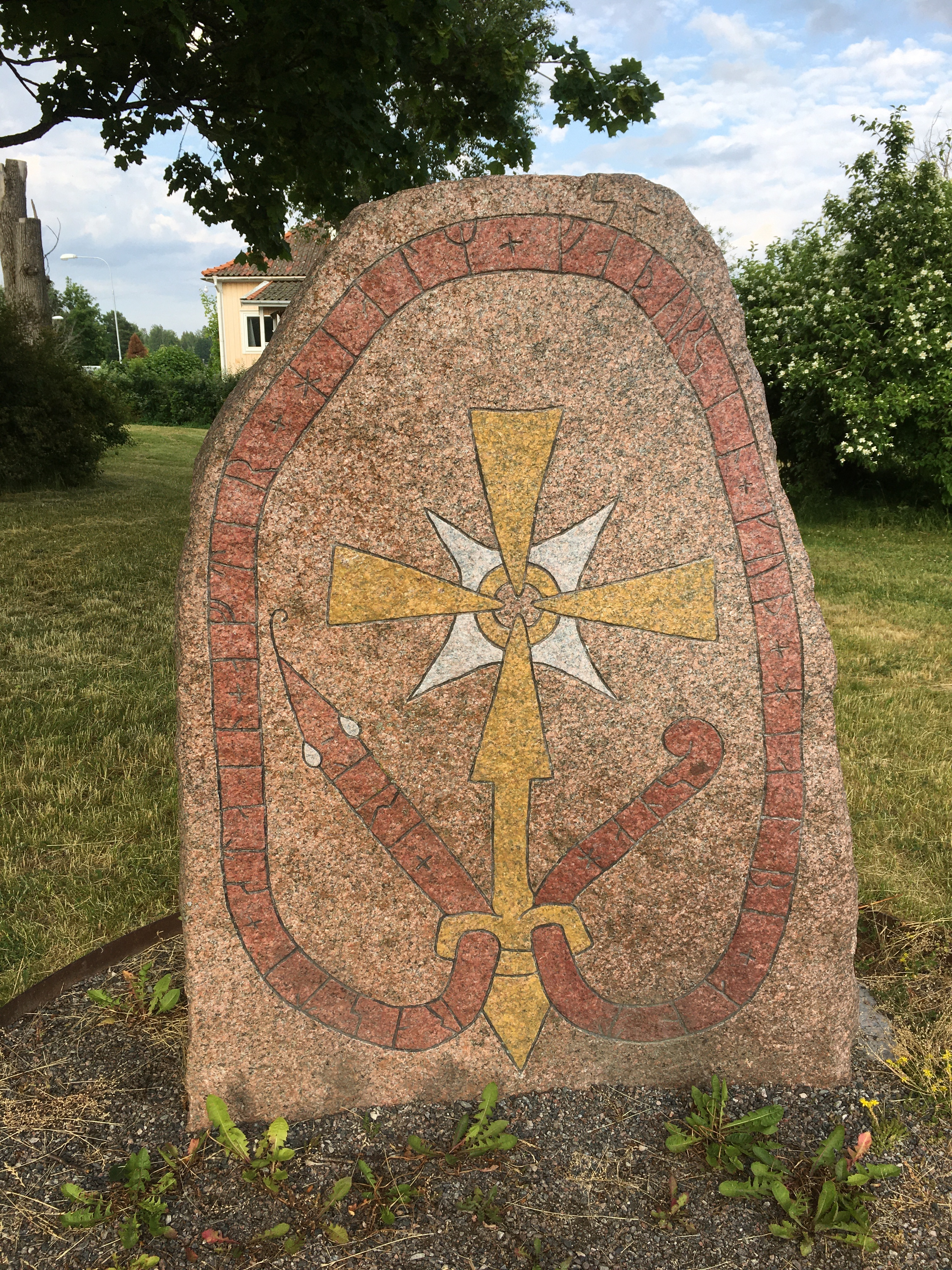
Modern replica of the runestone in Sweden

In 2014 a replica of stone U 1173 was made in Sweden and placed where the original would have come from, at Morgongåva in Uppsala, by a group called Hebys "nya" runsten, led by project manager Mats Köben, an amateur archaeologist and enthusiast. This replica was carved by runemaster Kalle Dahlberg (Runistare) who visited Edinburgh in 2013 to measure the stone and record the design, before carving it from pink granite, sourced from Vätö Stenhuggeri at Adelsö Island.

== See also ==
- List of runestones
