= Ross Fountain =

Fountain in Edinburgh, Scotland

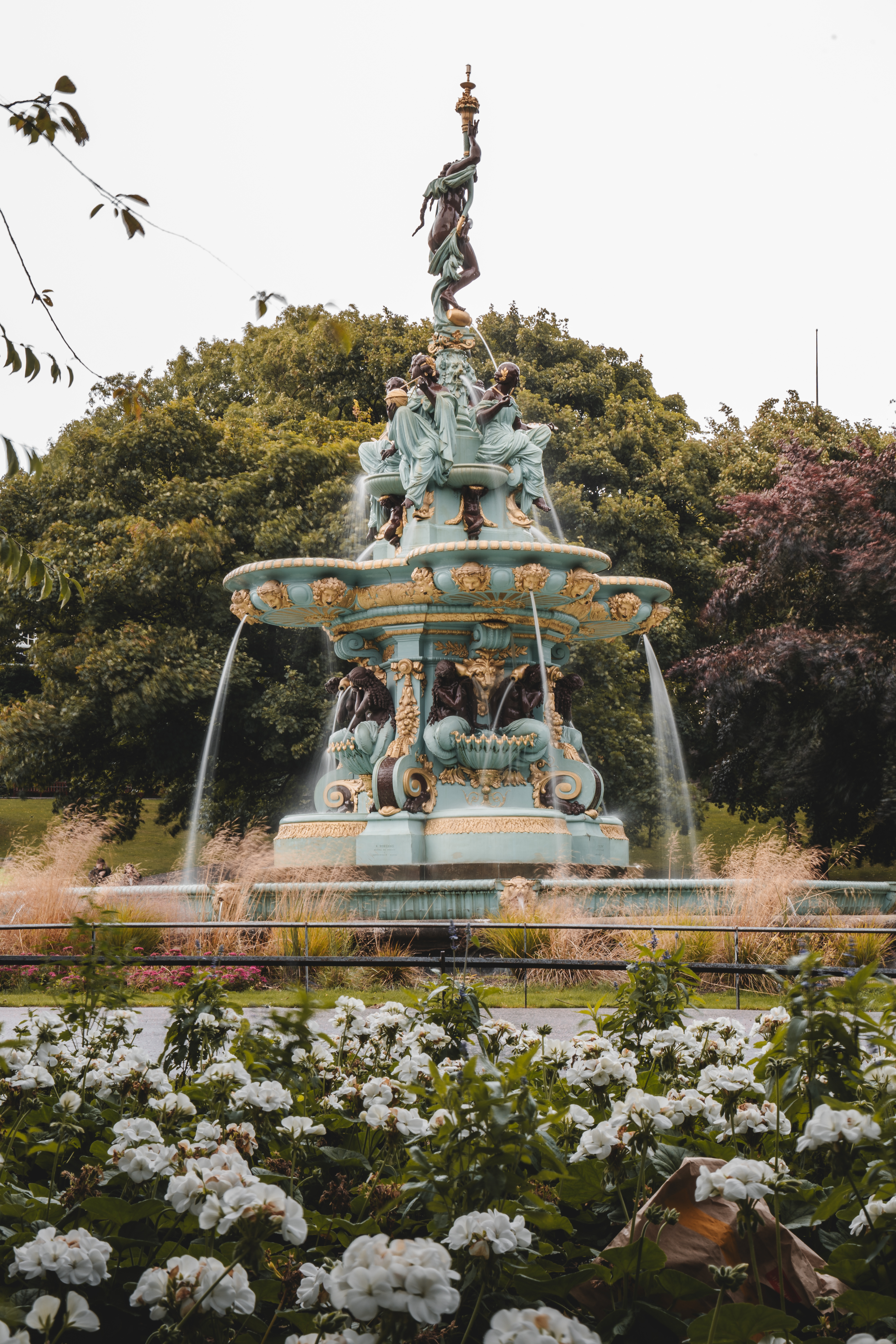
The newly restored Ross Fountain in West Princes Street Gardens, Edinburgh

Ross Fountain is a cast-iron structure located in West Princes Street Gardens, Edinburgh. It was installed in 1872 and restored in 2018.

== History ==
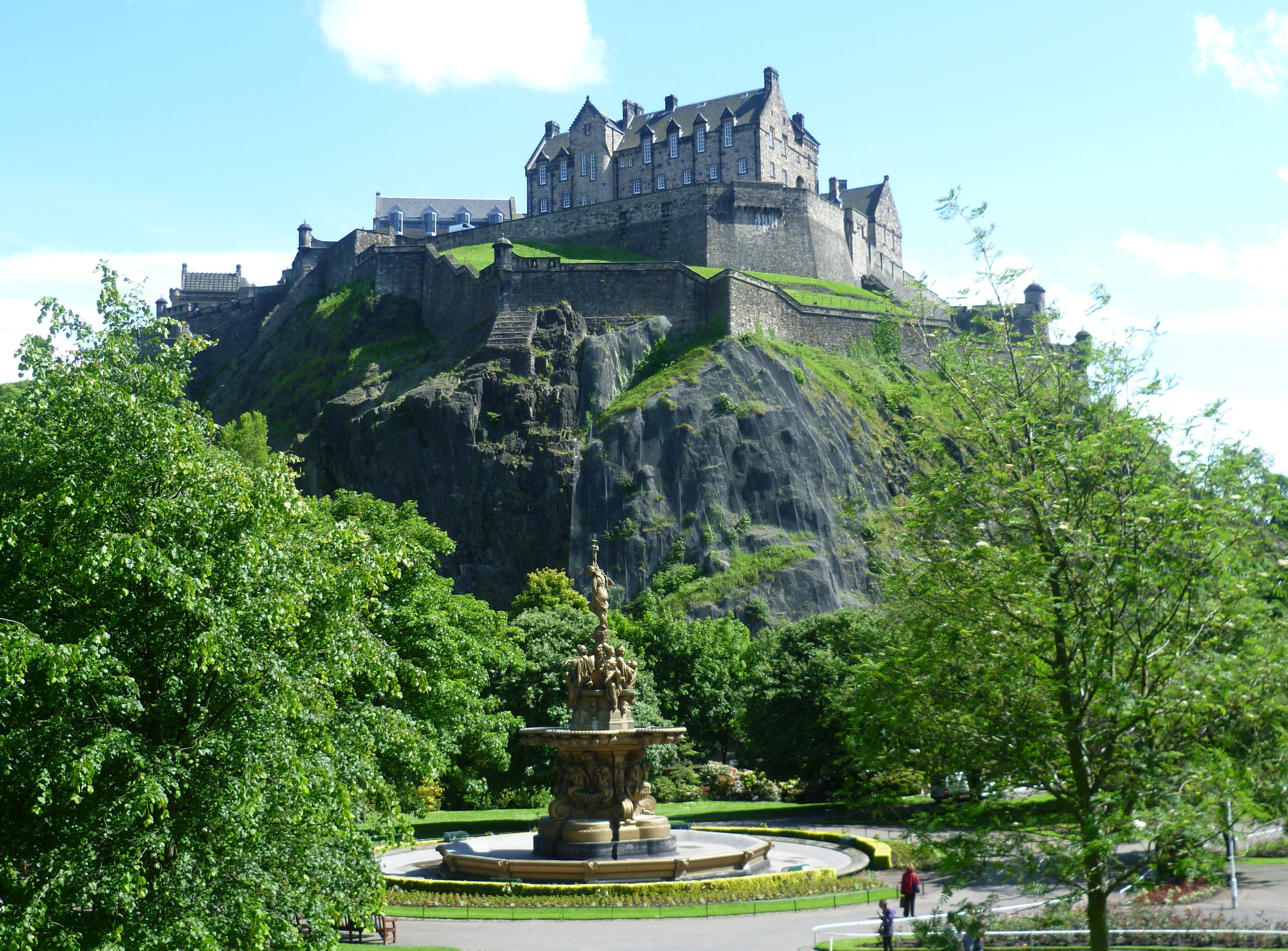
View from West Princes Street looking towards Edinburgh Castle showing the fountain before restoration

The Ross Fountain was produced at the iron foundry of Antoine Durenne in Sommevoire, France. It was an exhibit at the Great Exhibition of 1862.

It was purchased by gunmaker Daniel Ross in 1862 for £2,000 and subsequently gifted to the city of Edinburgh. It was transported to Leith in 1869 in 122 pieces. It was installed in its current position in 1872. It had some extensive restoration work completed in 2001.

== Restoration ==
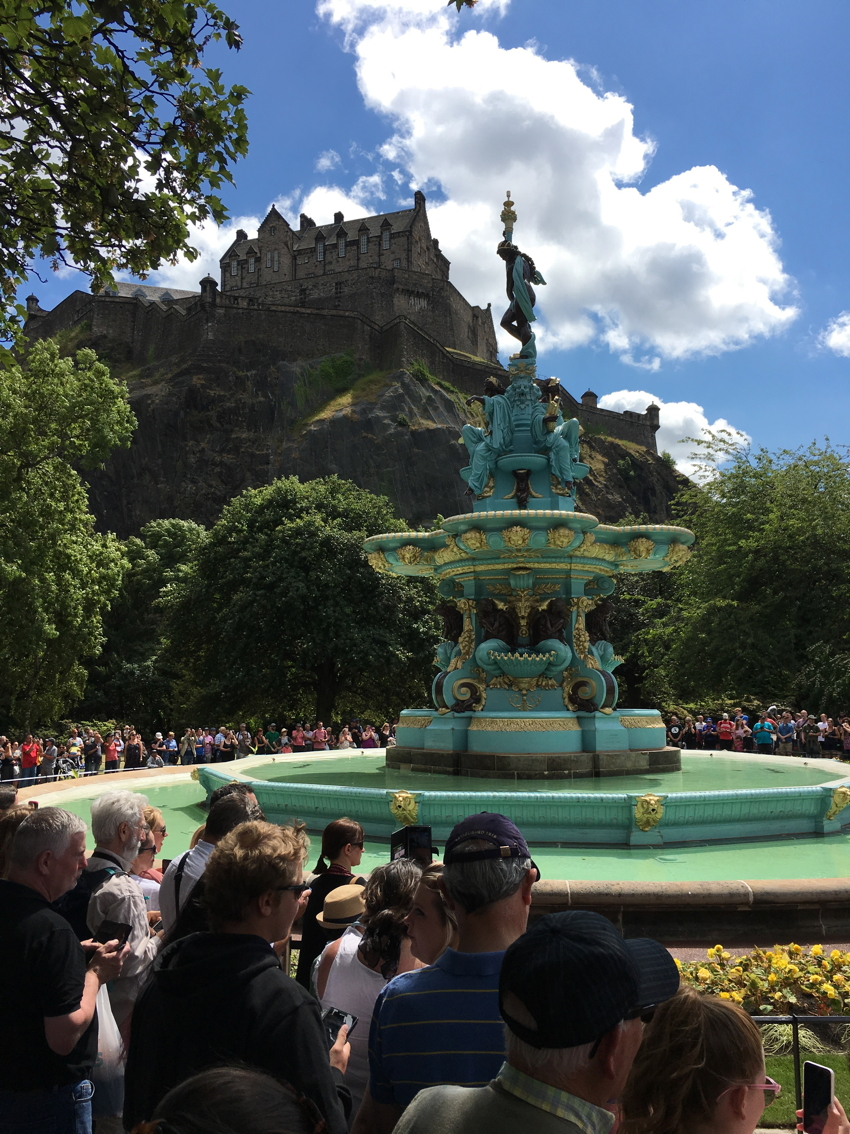
Switching on the newly restored Ross Fountain in West Princes Street Gardens, Edinburgh on 8 July 2018

Water was turned off in 2008 and it was closed again from July 2017 for further restoration work undertaken by Lost Art Limited of Wigan on behalf of The Ross Development Trust, costing 1.9 million pounds.

On 8 July 2018, it was re-inaugurated by Lord Provost Frank Ross and others, including the Head of Mission at the French Consulate in Edinburgh Emmanuel Cocher.

The fountain is now painted in turquoise, brown and gold. According to the organisers, the paintwork should last for at least 20 years. The fountain has a new pump and will be switched on permanently.

== See also ==
- Hubert Fountain
