= Princes Street Gardens =

Park in Edinburgh, Scotland

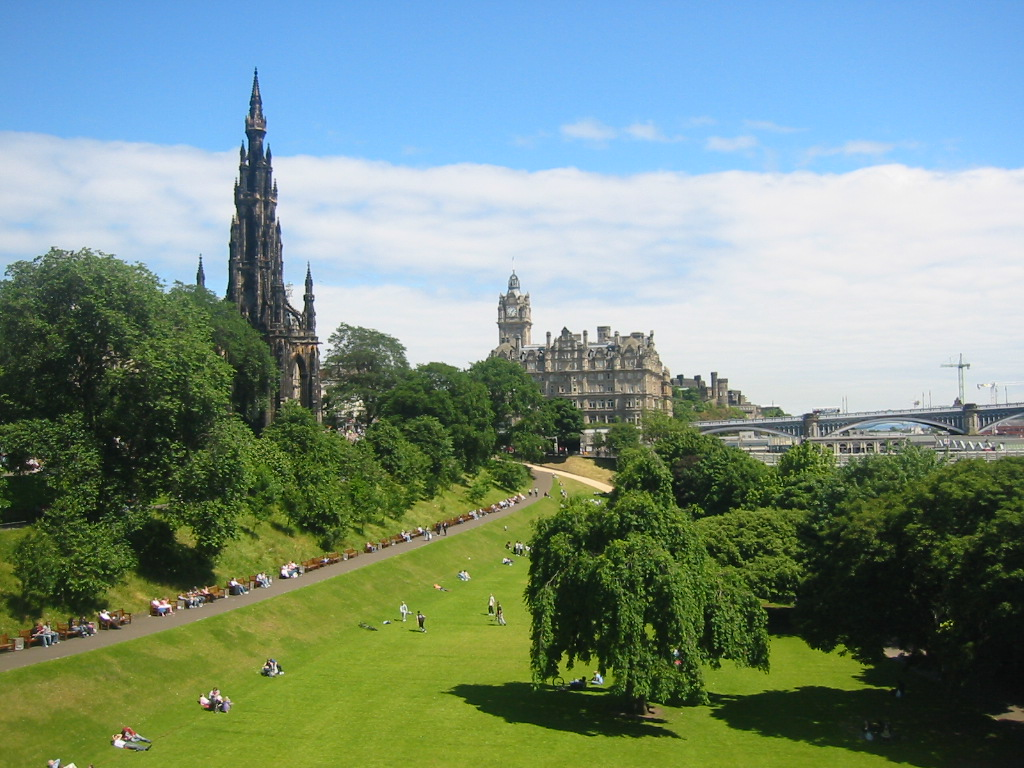
- East Princes Street Gardens in 2005, looking north-east from The Mound, showing the Scott Monument (l), Balmoral Hotel (c) and Waverley Station (r) with the North Bridge behind it

- Location within the City of Edinburgh council area
- Type: Urban park
- Location: Edinburgh, Scotland, United Kingdom
- Coordinates: 55°57′01″N 3°12′03″W
- Area: 8.5 acres (3.4 ha; 0.0133 mi^{2}; 0.034 km^{2})
- Created: c. 1825
- Owner: City of Edinburgh

Princes Street Gardens are two adjacent public parks in the centre of Edinburgh, Scotland, lying in the shadow of Edinburgh Castle. The Gardens were created in the 1820s following the long draining of the Nor Loch and building of the New Town, beginning in the 1760s.

The loch, situated on the north side of the town, was originally an artificial creation forming part of its medieval defences and made expansion northwards difficult. The water was habitually polluted from sewage draining downhill from the Old Town.

The gardens run along the south side of Princes Street and are divided by The Mound, on which the National Gallery of Scotland and the Royal Scottish Academy buildings are located. East Princes Street Gardens run from The Mound to Waverley Bridge, and cover 8.5 acres (3.4 ha). The larger West Princes Street Gardens cover 29 acres (12 ha) and extend to the adjacent churches of St. John's and St. Cuthbert's, near Lothian Road in the west.

In 1846 the railway was built in the valley to connect the Edinburgh-Glasgow line at Haymarket with the new northern terminus of the North British line from Berwick-upon-Tweed at Waverley Station.

The Gardens are the best known parks in Edinburgh, having the highest awareness and visitor figures for both residents and visitors to the city.

== Railway ==
In 1846, the Edinburgh and Glasgow Railway company constructed a railway line in a cutting along the southern edge of the Gardens to join its Haymarket terminus to a new General Station adjoining the North British Railway Company's North Bridge terminus (both stations later renamed Waverley Station). This involved constructing the Haymarket Tunnel (comprising separate north and south tunnels), 910 metres long, between the western end of the gardens and Haymarket Station. A shorter tunnel (again comprising two separate tunnels) was also dug through The Mound which separated the East and West Gardens.

== East Princes Street Gardens ==
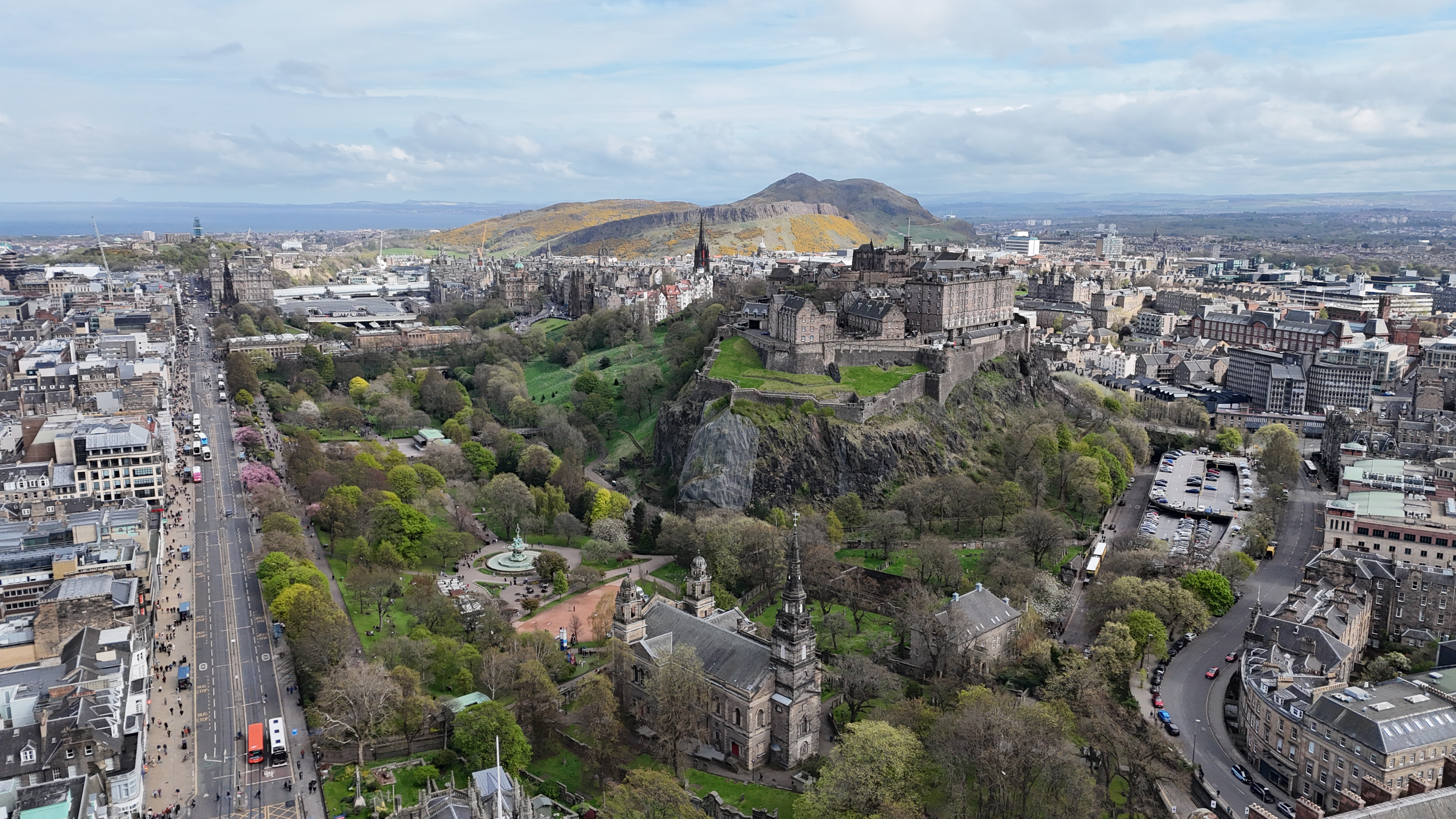
Princes Street Gardens and Edinburgh Castle

=== History ===
East Princes Street Gardens originated after a dispute between Edinburgh Corporation (town council) and the early New Town proprietors, among whom was the philosopher David Hume who resided in St. David Street, a side street off Princes Street. In 1771 the council acquired the land as part of the First New Town development. It began feuing ground on the south side of Princes Street (on the site of the current Balmoral Hotel and Waverley Market) for the building of houses and workshops for a coach-builder and a furniture-maker. After a failed petition to the council the proprietors raised two actions in the Court of Session to halt the building and to condemn the Corporation for having contravened their feuing terms by which they had presupposed open ground and a vista south of the street. After the Court found in favour of the council on the first point the decision was quickly appealed to the House of Lords and overturned, but when the Court again supported the council on the second point, the matter was submitted to judicial arbitration. This resulted in a judgement that the houses could be completed which later allowed the North British Hotel (Balmoral Hotel) to be built on the site, that the adjacent furniture-maker's premises must not rise above the level of Princes Street (which is the reason the roof of Waverley Market is at street level) and that the ground westwards for half the length of Princes Street "shall be kept and preserved in perpetuity as pleasure-grounds to be dressed up at the expense of the town council as soon as may be."

=== Monuments ===
Along the south side of Princes Street are many statues and monuments. In the East Gardens most prominent is the Scott Monument, a Neo-Gothic spire built in 1844 to honour Sir Walter Scott. Within East Princes Street Gardens there are statues of the explorer David Livingstone, the publisher and Lord Provost Adam Black and the essayist Professor John Wilson, who wrote under the pseudonym Christopher North. There is also a small commemorative stone honouring the volunteers from the Lothians and Fife who fought in the Spanish Civil War.

=== Edinburgh's Christmas ===
Every year, in the weeks leading up to the end of the year, the East Gardens are transformed into 'Edinburgh's Christmas'. This includes a variety of amusement park rides and the Christmas Market, which has food and gifts from all around the world. The most notable attraction is the 33 metre (108 feet) high Ferris wheel.

== West Princes Street Gardens ==
=== Early history ===
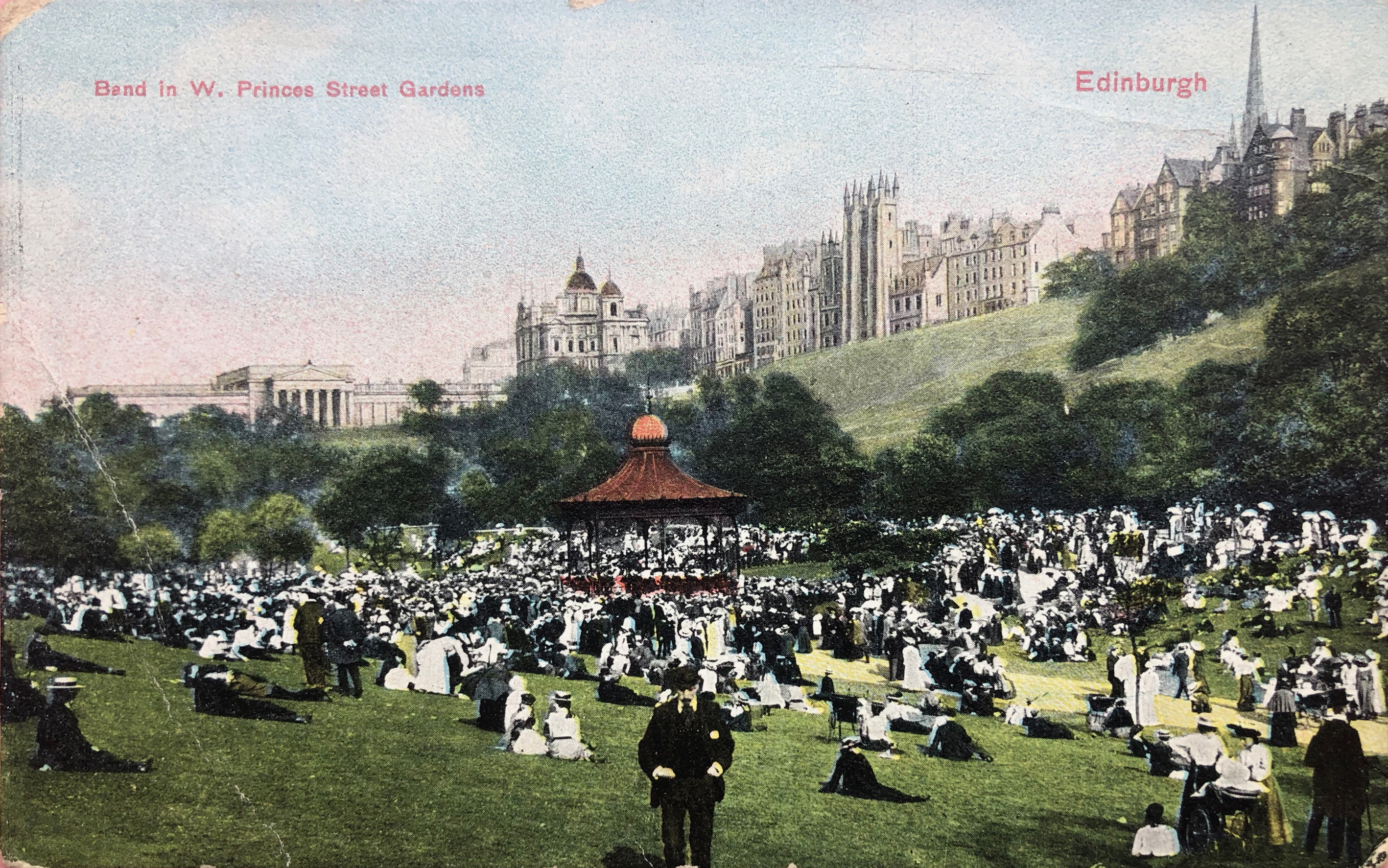
The original Ross Bandstand in West Princes Street Gardens, in or before 1906

West Princes Street Gardens were originally the private property of "the Princes Street Proprietors" who overlooked them from their houses on the western half of the street. This was passed to them from the council in 1816 and the gardens were opened to subscribers generally in the New Town in 1821.

Dogs, cricket, perambulators and smoking were prohibited under their rules, and people using bath-chairs had to present a doctor's certificate to the Committee of the garden attesting to their ailment not being contagious. An application by the Scottish Association for Suppressing Drunkenness that the gardens be opened during Christmas and New Year "with the object of keeping parties out of the dram shops (i.e. illegal drinking premises)" led eventually to them being opened to the general public on Christmas Day, New Year's Day and one other day in the year.

=== Public park ===
The Gardener's Cottage of West Princes Street Gardens in 2014, before it was restored by the Ross Development Trust

In 1876, despite much opposition from residents, the town council reacquired the ground for use as a public park. The new park was laid out by the City Architect Robert Morham including the building of a very picturesque gardeners cottage at the east end of the West Gardens. As part of a later agreement (c.1880) the council widened Princes Street (resulting in a far steeper embankment on that side). A series of statues were erected along the edge of the widened road.

Modernization of the gardens is currently under discussion with the launch of The Quaich Project fundraising campaign from the Ross Development Trust. The new design will improve accessibility and provide new pathways and connections across the city.

=== Shelters ===
In 1939 four huge air-raid shelters were created within this northern embankment. The distinctive shelters now on the upper walkway date from 1950 and were designed by Alexander Garden Forgie. As with most structures in the gardens they are listed buildings.

=== Ross Bandstand ===
The first bandstand was erected in the centre of the West Gardens in 1877. The Princes Street proprietors contributed £500 as a goodwill gesture to its cost. The present building, the second to be erected on the site, dates from 1935, and is named after William Henry Ross, Chairman of the Distillers Company Ltd., who paid for it.

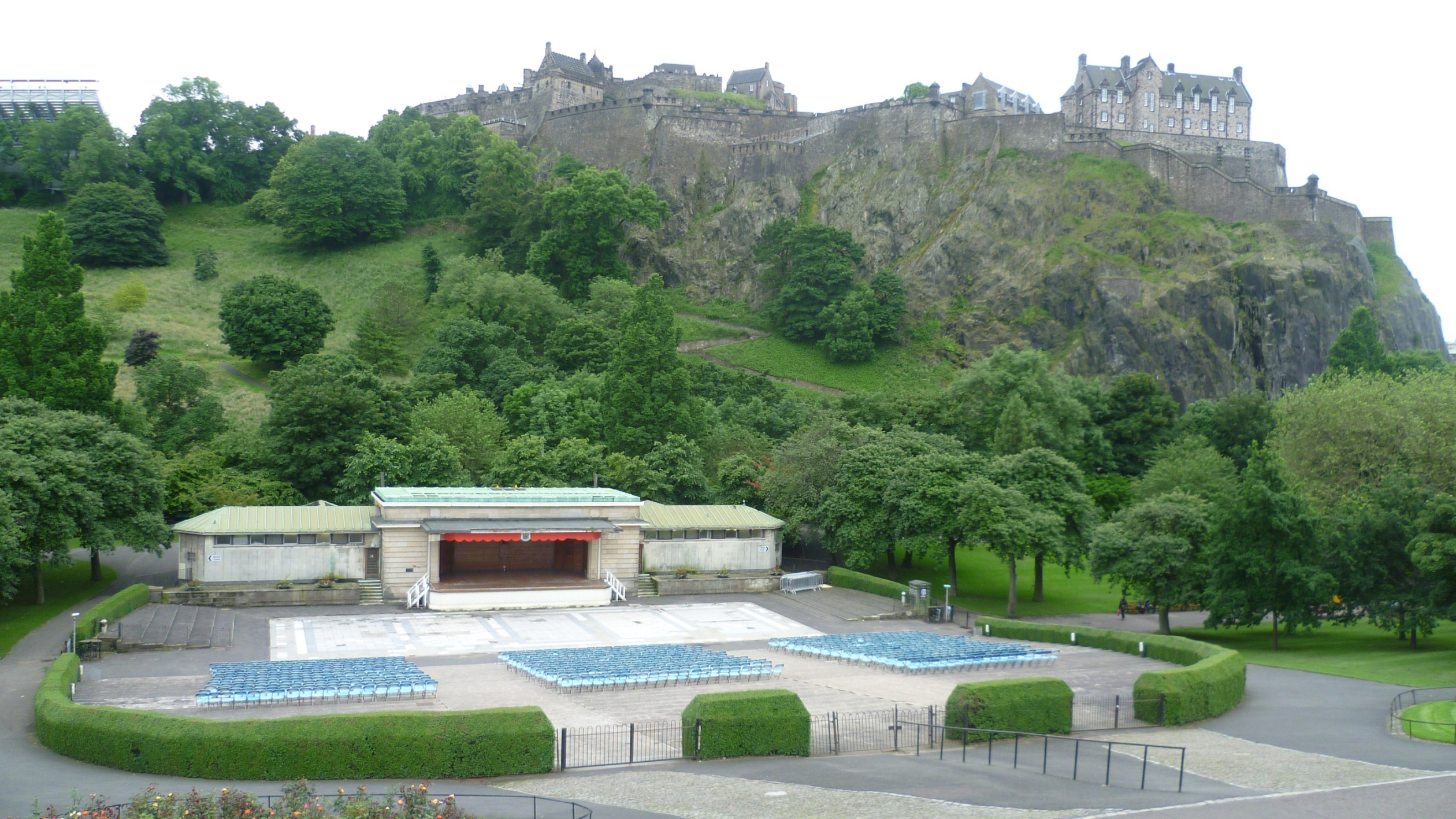
The Ross Bandstand of 1935 that the Ross Development Trust proposed to replace

Various concerts and other events are held at the Ross Bandstand including the Festival Fireworks Concert, Men's Health Survival of the Fittest, and during the city's Hogmanay celebrations. The Ross Development Trust proposed to rebuild the bandstand as a Ross Pavilion based on design by architects wHY following an international competition in 2017. The proposed pavilion was to be known as the Quaich. However, the project was not progressed, because of funding shortfalls, the COVID-19 pandemic and the "potential impact on the city’s heritage".

=== Ross Fountain ===
The Ross Fountain is the focus of the western end of the gardens. Gifted by Edinburgh gunsmith Daniel Ross, it was originally installed in 1872 and restored in 2018 with the help of the Ross Development Trust.

=== Monuments ===
Along the south side of Princes Street are statues of the poet Allan Ramsay, the church reformer Thomas Guthrie, and the obstetric pioneer James Young Simpson. Other monuments are the Royal Scots Greys Memorial, the Scottish American War Memorial, the Norwegian Brigade War Memorial, and Wojtek the Bear.

The statuary group on the lower path represents The Genius of Architecture crowning the Theory and Practice of Art and is by William Brodie originally for the garden of Rockville, the home of his maverick architect son-in-law Sir James Gowans. It was moved here in the 1960s following the demolition of Rockville.

The Swedish runestone U 1173 was located beneath the Castle walls (grid reference NT25267352), however due to security concerns it was removed from its location in November 2017 and was moved to George Square, outside the school of Scandinavian studies in 2020.

At the eastern entrance to the Gardens there is the world's first floral clock dating from 1903.

=== Royal Scots Monument ===
The large curved monument to the Royal Scots stands slightly hidden just south of the gardener's cottage. It was designed by Sir Frank Mears with sculpture by Pilkington Jackson. Described as a "modern henge" it dates from 1950 but was added to and "finalised" in May 2007 following the termination of the Royal Scots in 2006. This added additional Battle Honours gained since the 1950s.

=== Mortonhall Baby Ashes Memorial ===
A new monument, in the form of a baby elephant by sculptor Andy Scott, was added to the gardens on 2 February 2019. Located by The Genius of Architecture, this is a permanent reminder of the 250 babies and their families affected by the Mortonhall scandal, which was uncovered in 2012.

=== Gallery ===
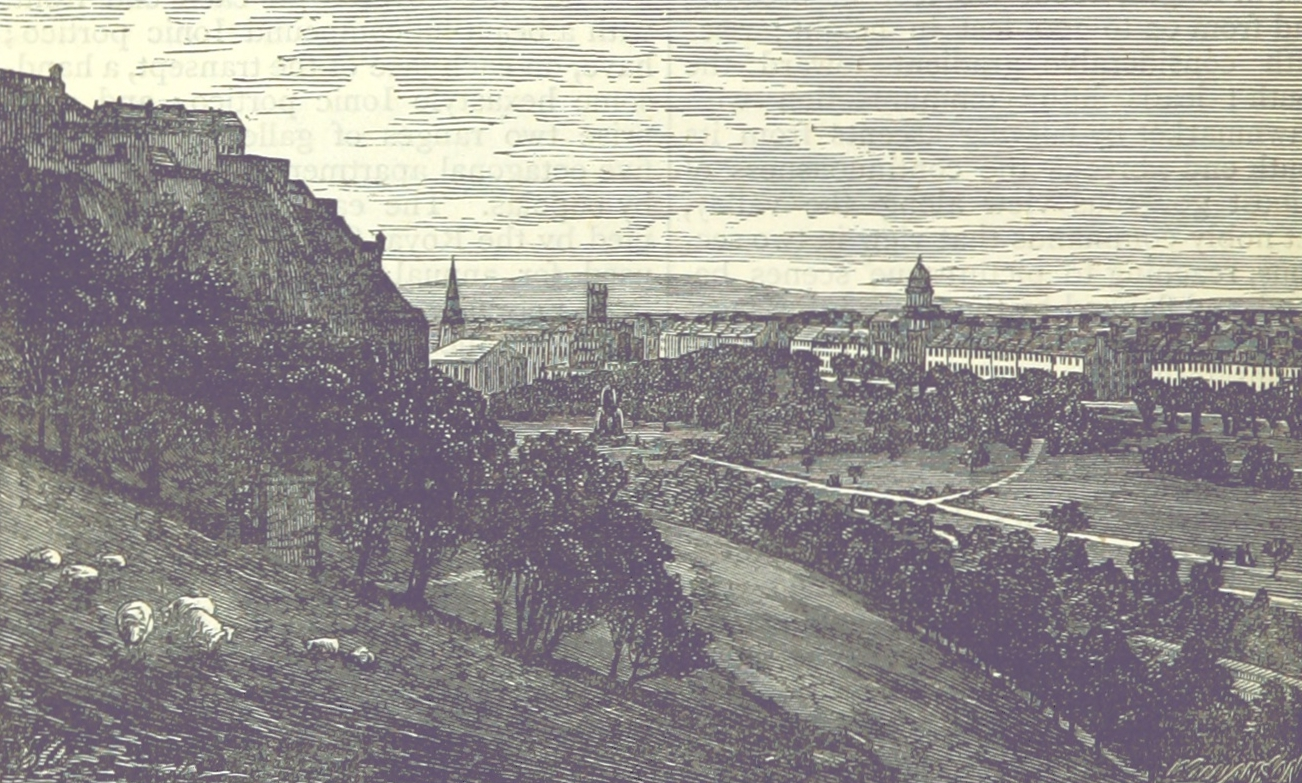
West Princes Street Gardens in 1875

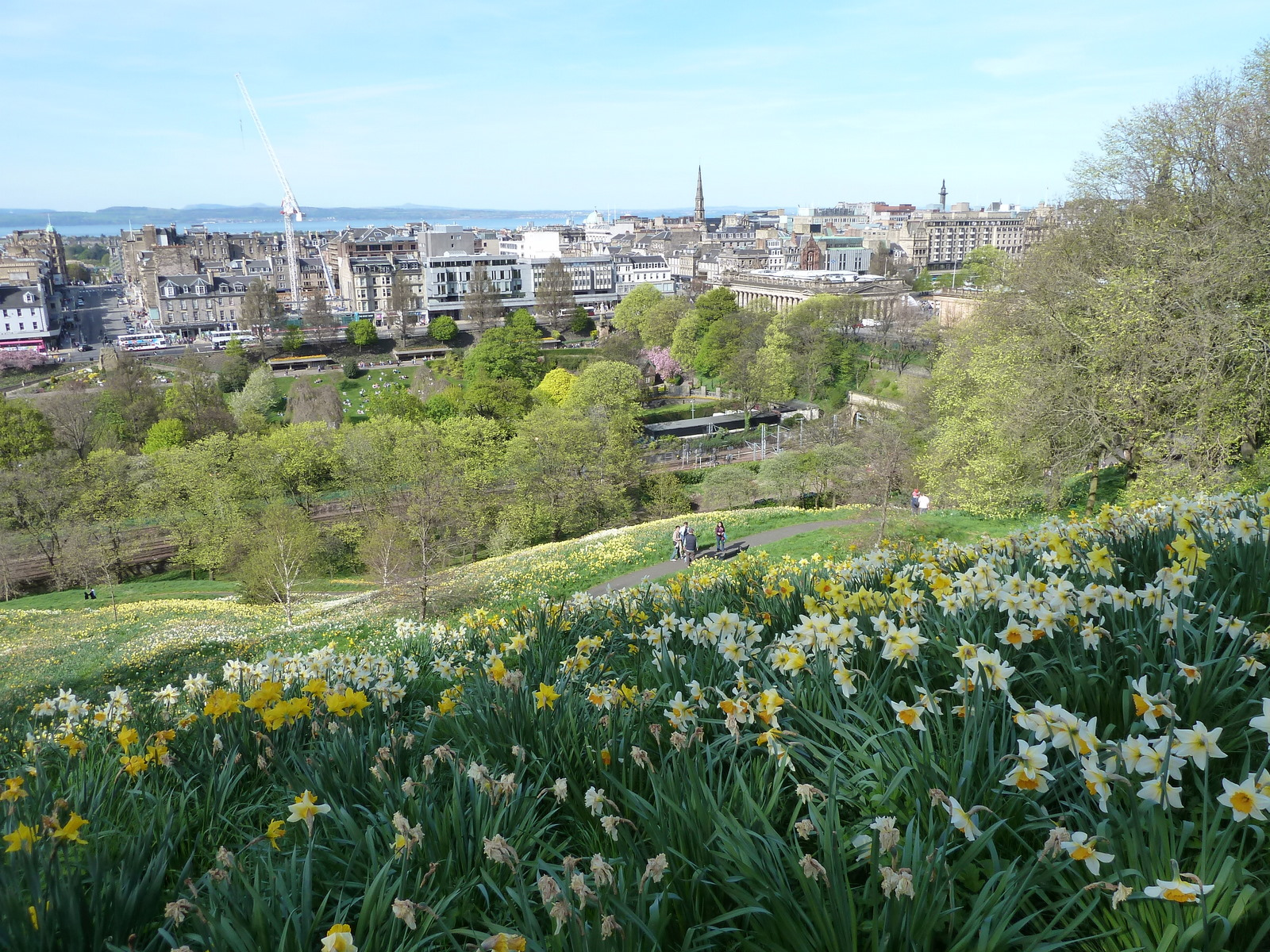
West Princes Street Gardens from the Edinburgh Castle slopes in 2011

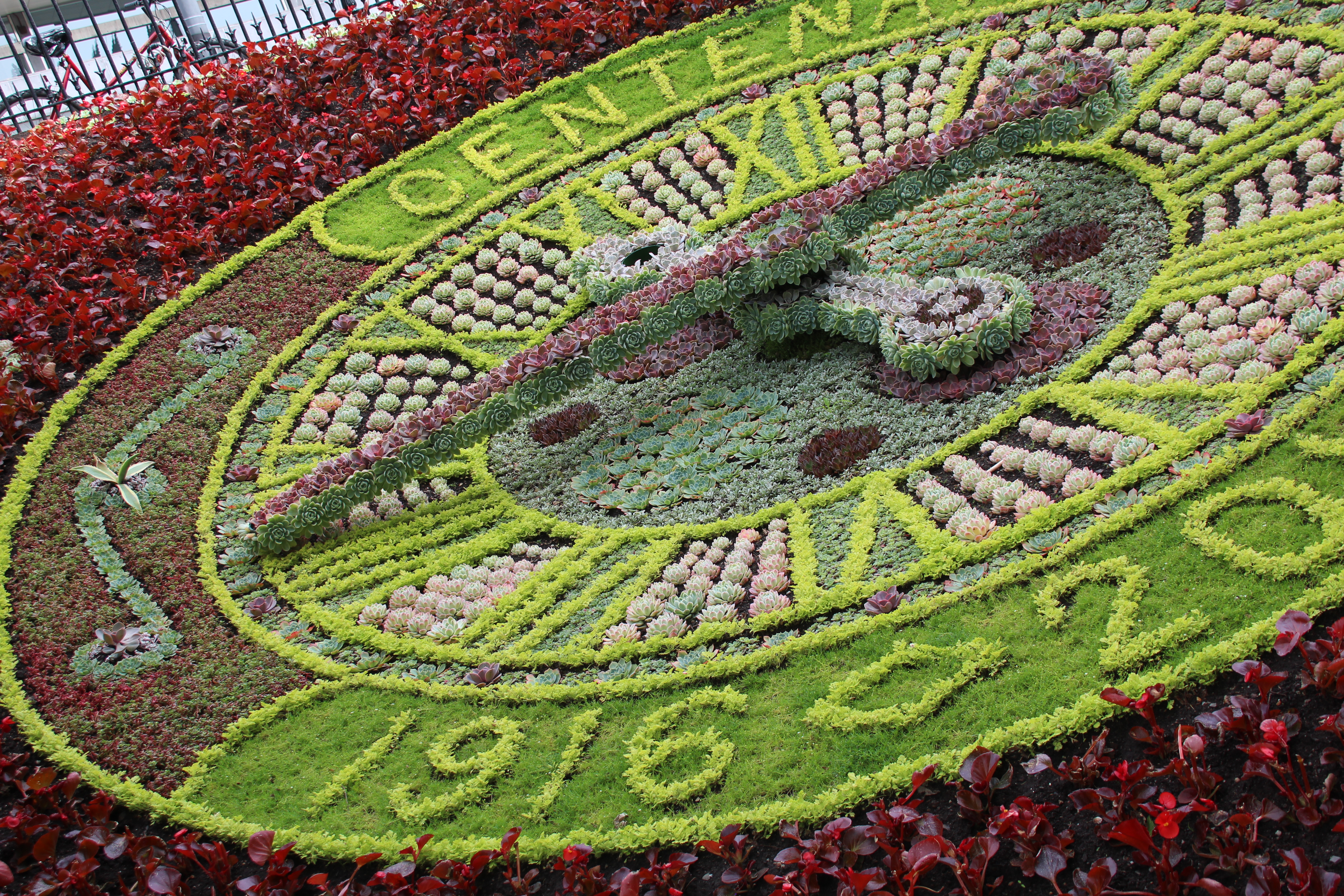
The Floral Clock

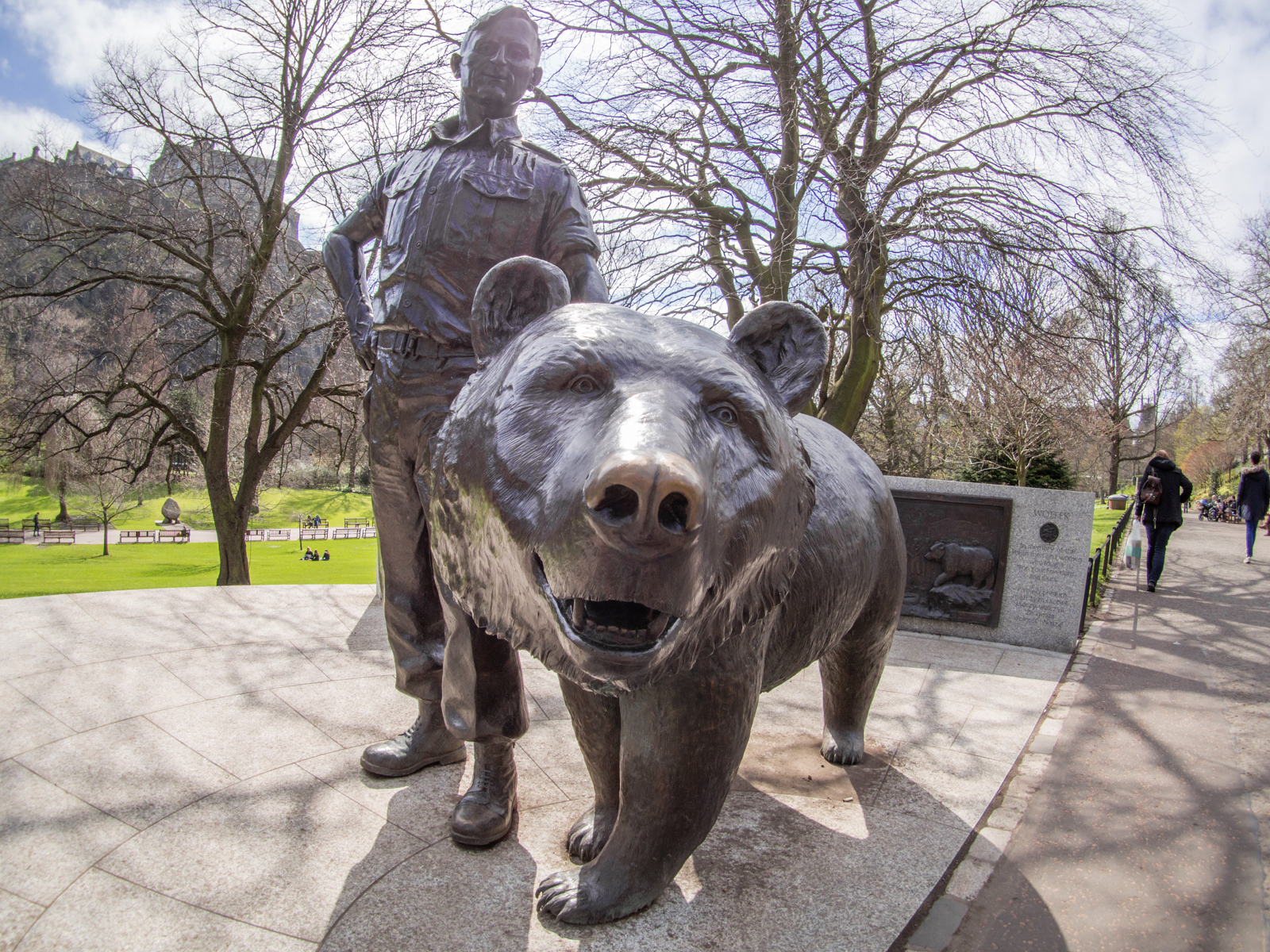
Wojtek the bear statue

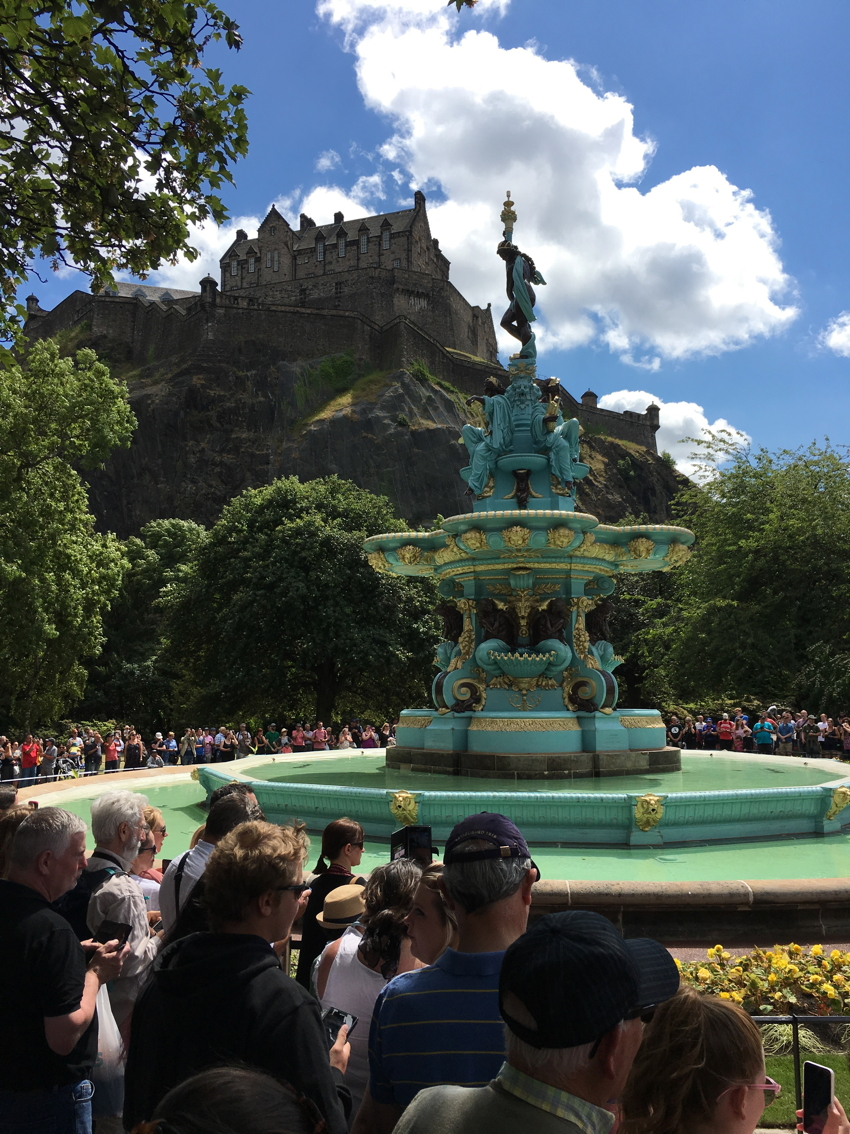
Switching on the newly restored Ross Fountain in West Princes Street Gardens, Edinburgh on 8 July 2018

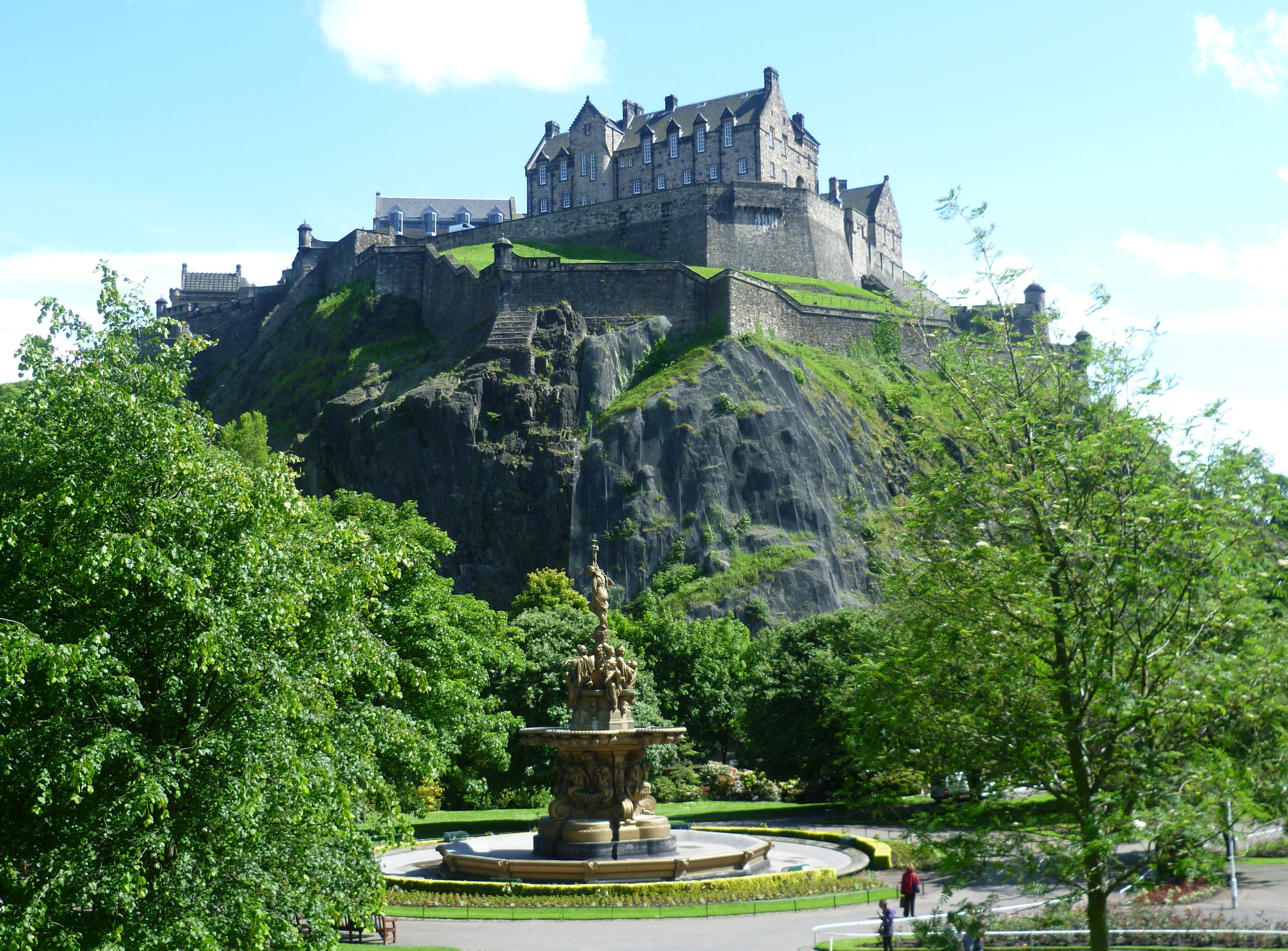
West Princes Street Gardens with the Ross Fountain in 2012, before the fountain was refurbished

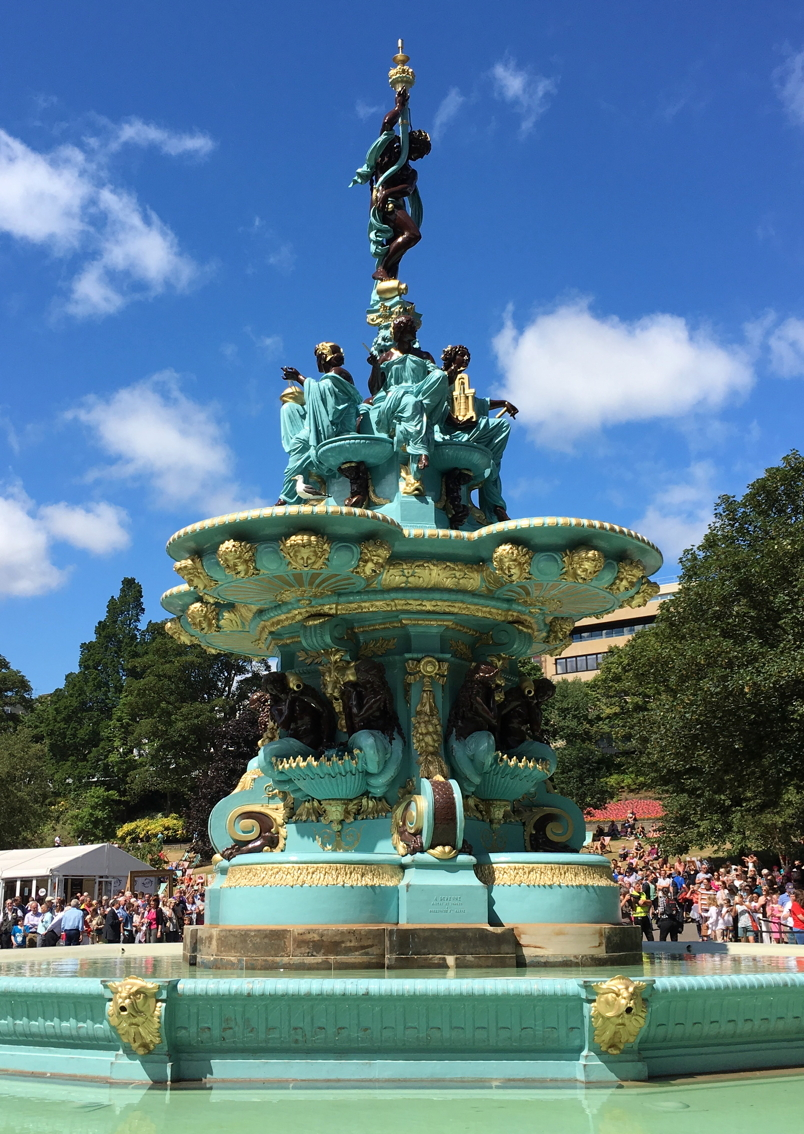
The newly restored Ross Fountain in West Princes Street Gardens, Edinburgh

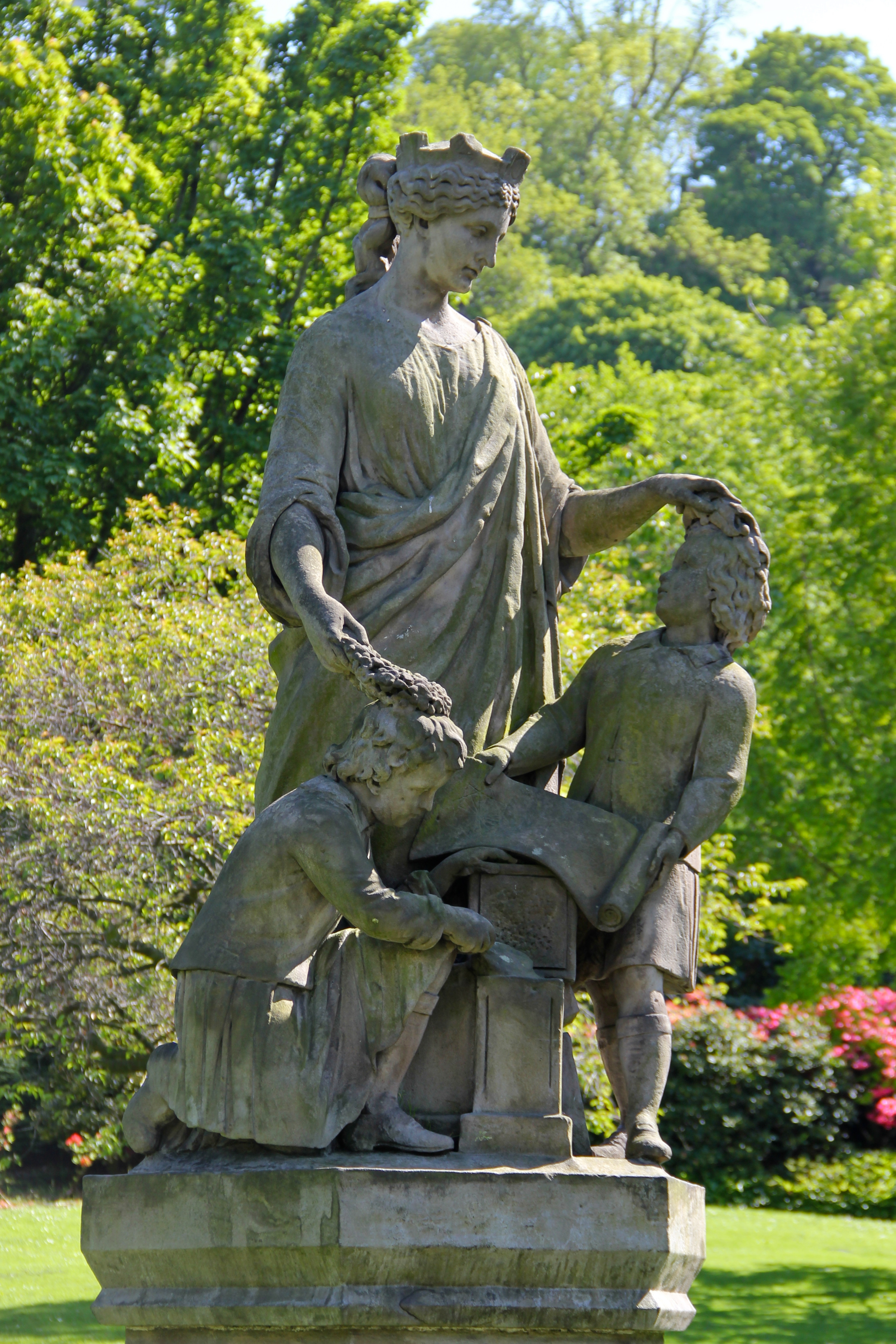
The Genius of Architecture crowning the Theory and Practice of Art

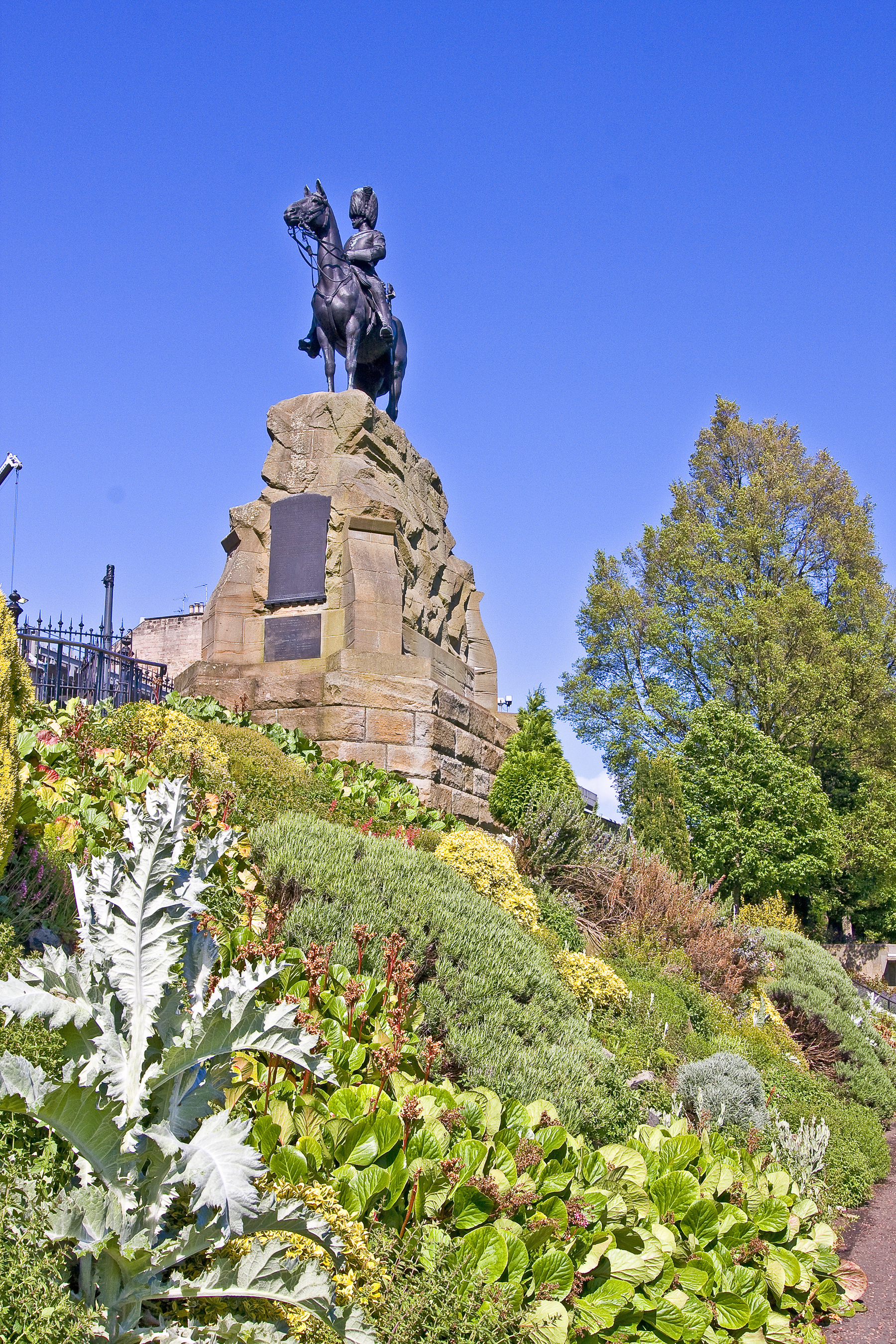
Royal Scots Greys Memorial

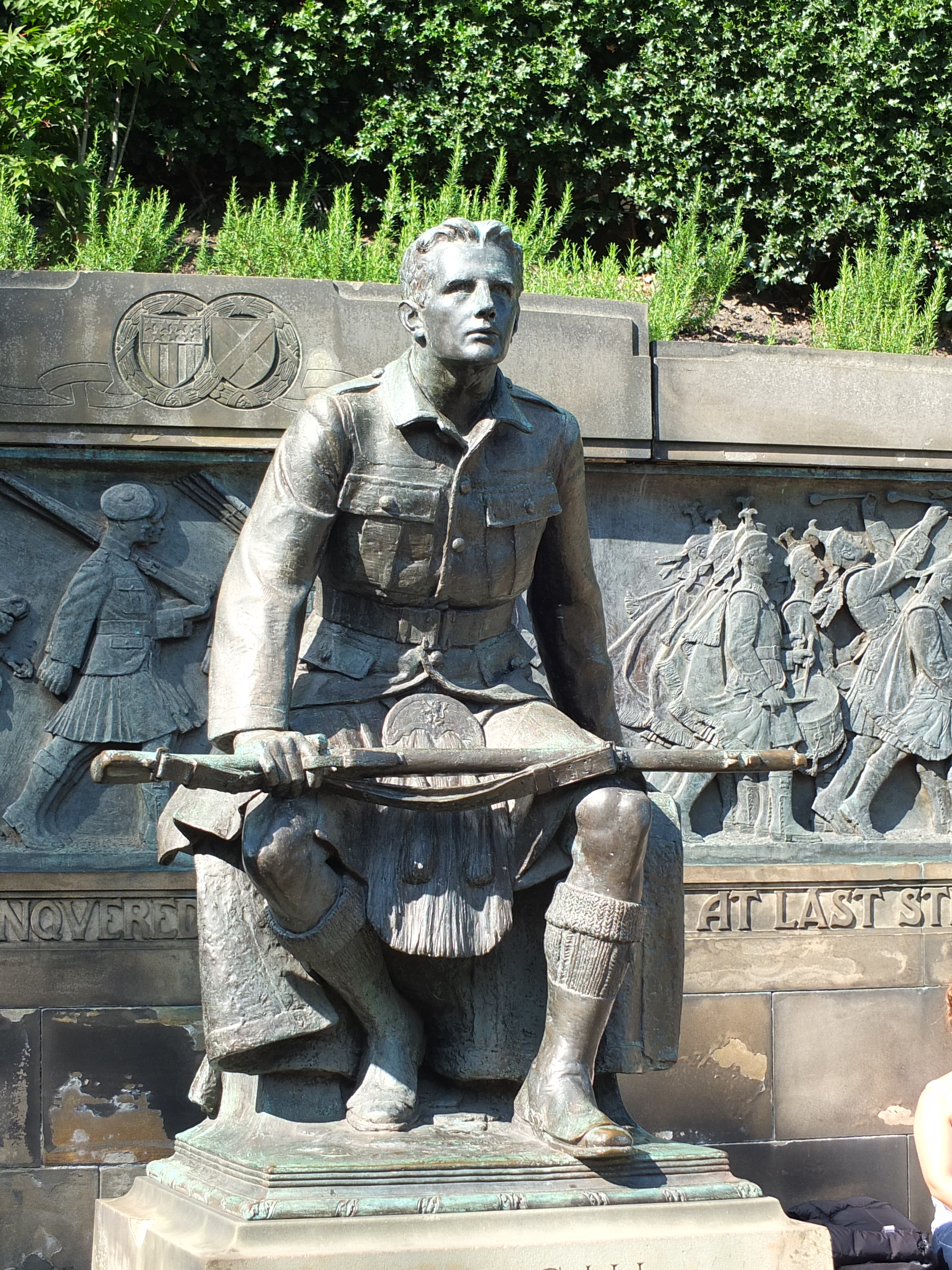
Scottish-American War Memorial by was designed by R. Tait McKenzie, erected in 1927

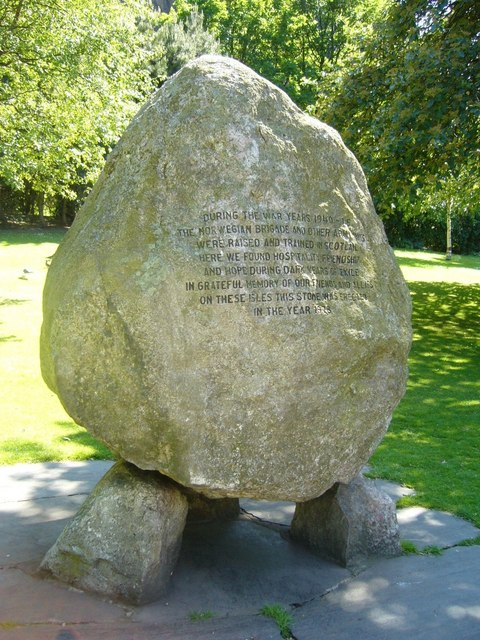
Norwegian Brigade Stone, donated in 1978 by Norwegian veterans trained in Scotland during the Second World War

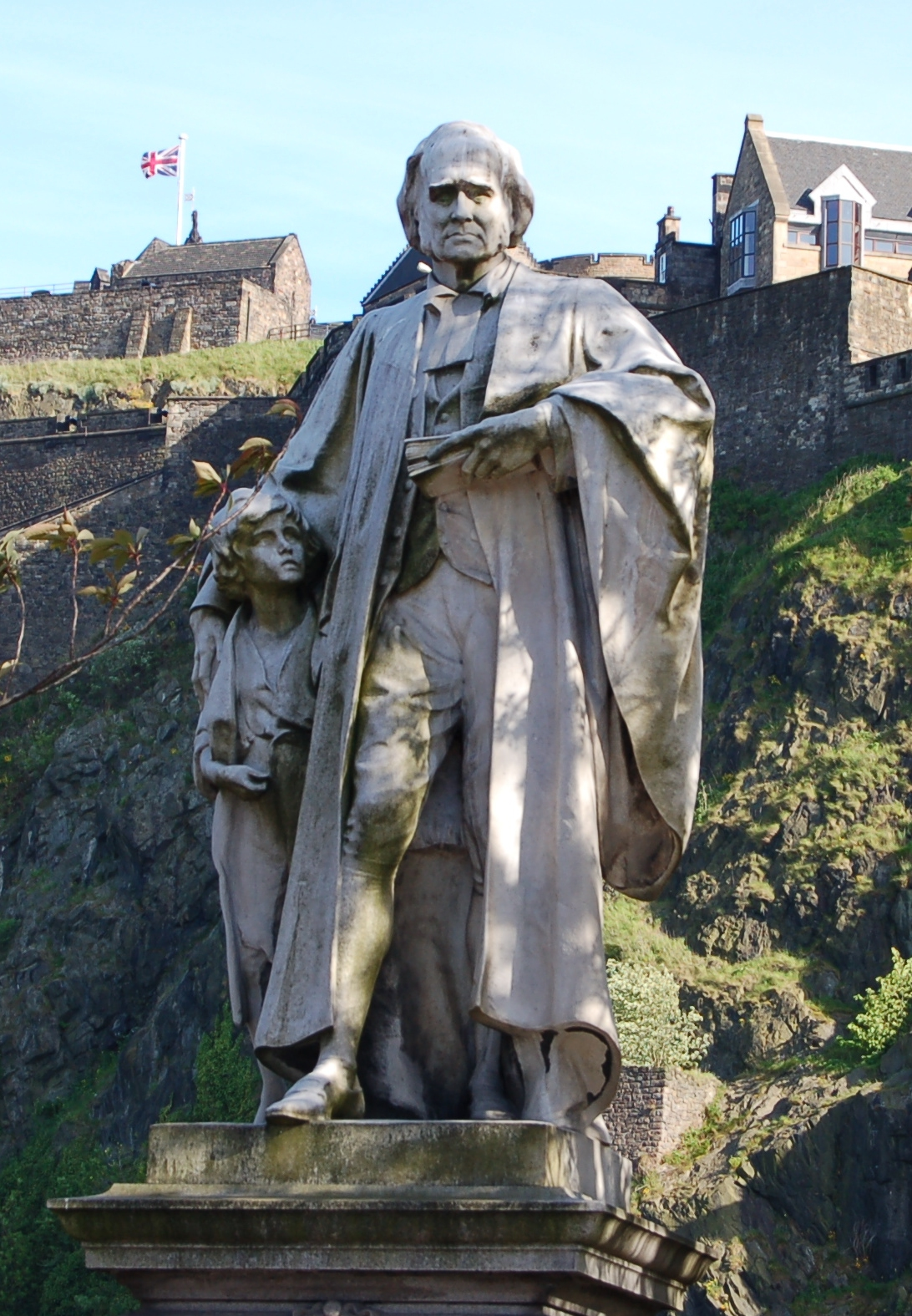
Statue of Thomas Guthrie

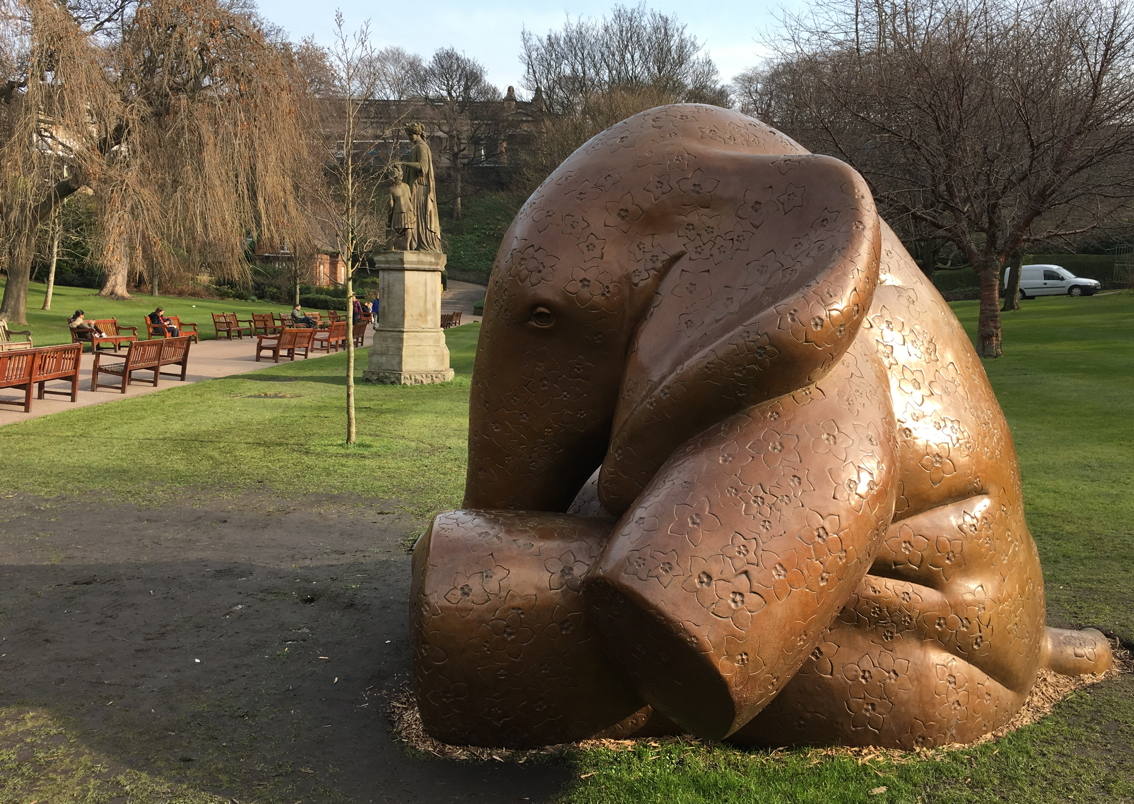
Mortonhall Baby Ashes Memorial

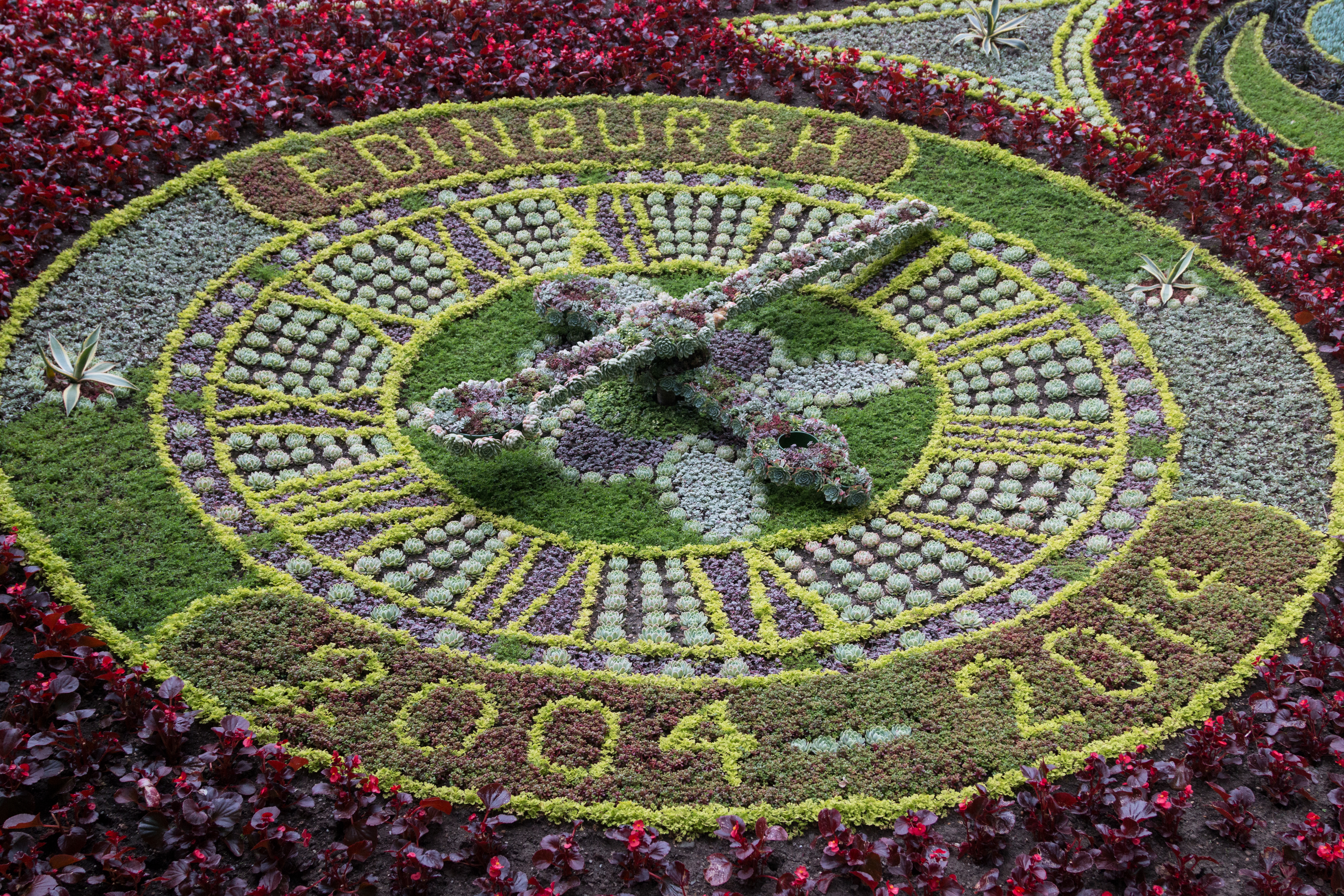
The Floral Clock at the east entrance to West Princes Street Gardens

== Castle Gardens ==
=== Castle Hill Gardens ===
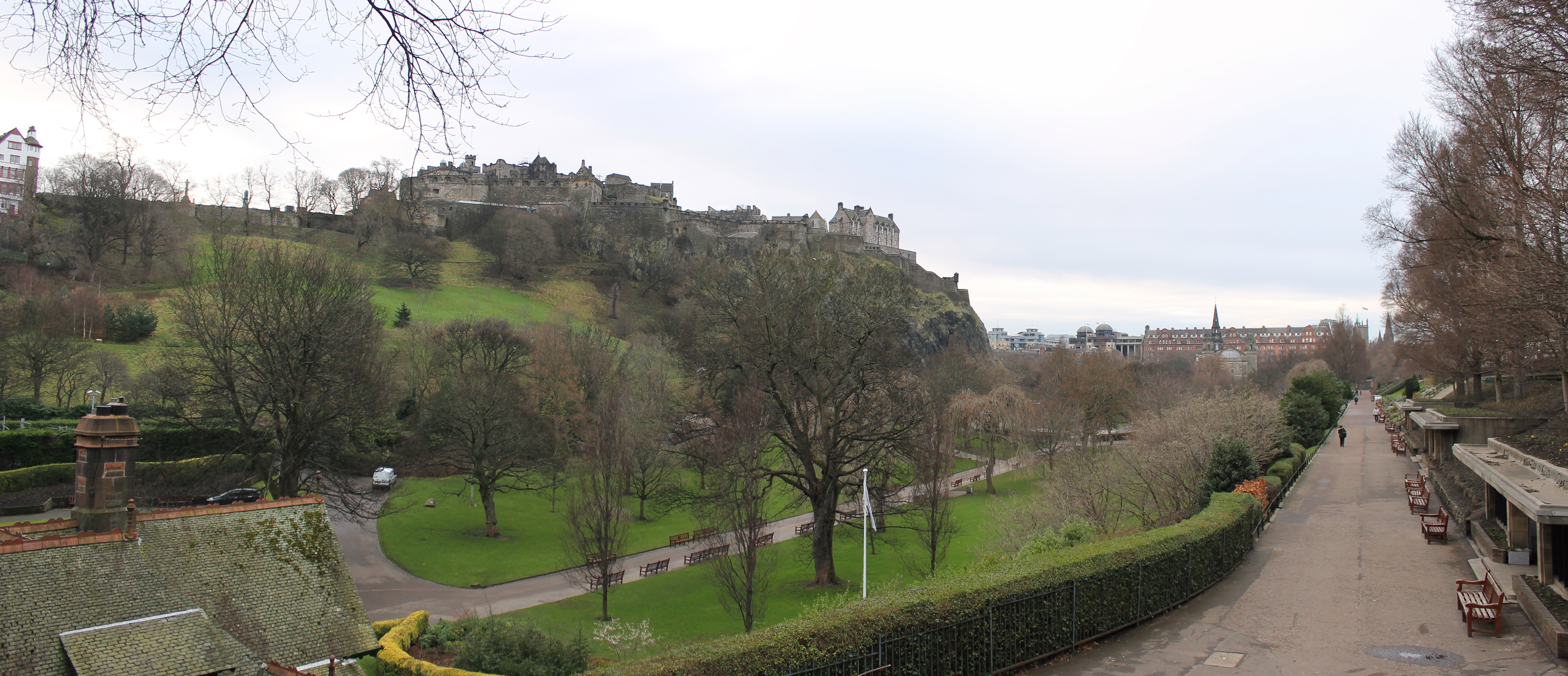
A view of West Princes Street Gardens running up to the Castle Hill Gardens with the rail line separating the gardens hidden

Running along the southern edge of the West Princes Street Gardens is a train line separating the garden from the Castle Hill Garden. You can access Castle Hill Garden via a bridge behind the Ross Band Stand. This garden includes a postern to Edinburgh Castle, a plaque commemorating the location of a Zeppelin bomb from an air raid in World War I, the ruins of St Margarets well house and tower, a sculpture commemorating the twinning of Edinburgh and San Diego cities, and a recreation of woodland from the era of David I.

This part of the garden was closed in 2019 because of the danger of rockfall. A rock-catching fence was installed in 2025 to protect the area, allowing the path between Princes Street and King Stables Road to be re-opened.

=== Castle Terrace Gardens ===
Until the 1960s on the western side of the West Princes Street Gardens the Castle Terrace Gardens were adjoined. In 1964 these gardens were dug up to construct a 750-bay car park.

== See also ==
- List of public art in Edinburgh
