= Apex Hotels =

Scottish hotel operator

Apex Hotels Ltd.
- Industry: Hospitality industry
- Founded: 1996
- Founder: Norman Springford
- Headquarters: Edinburgh, Scotland, UK
- Number of locations: 5 cities, 8 hotels
- Area served: United Kingdom
- Website: www.apexhotels.co.uk

Apex Hotels is an operator of four star hotels based in Edinburgh, Scotland. The company operates 8 hotels in the United Kingdom.

== History ==
Executive Chairman of Apex Hotels, Norman Springford, was previously an employee of the Inland Revenue and owner/operator of a number of public houses, bingo halls, and the Edinburgh Playhouse. In 1996 Norman opened his first hotel, the Apex International Hotel, in Edinburgh. The group now own 8 UK hotels across London, Edinburgh, Glasgow and Dundee.
