= Thomas Duncan Rhind =

Scottish architect and military figure

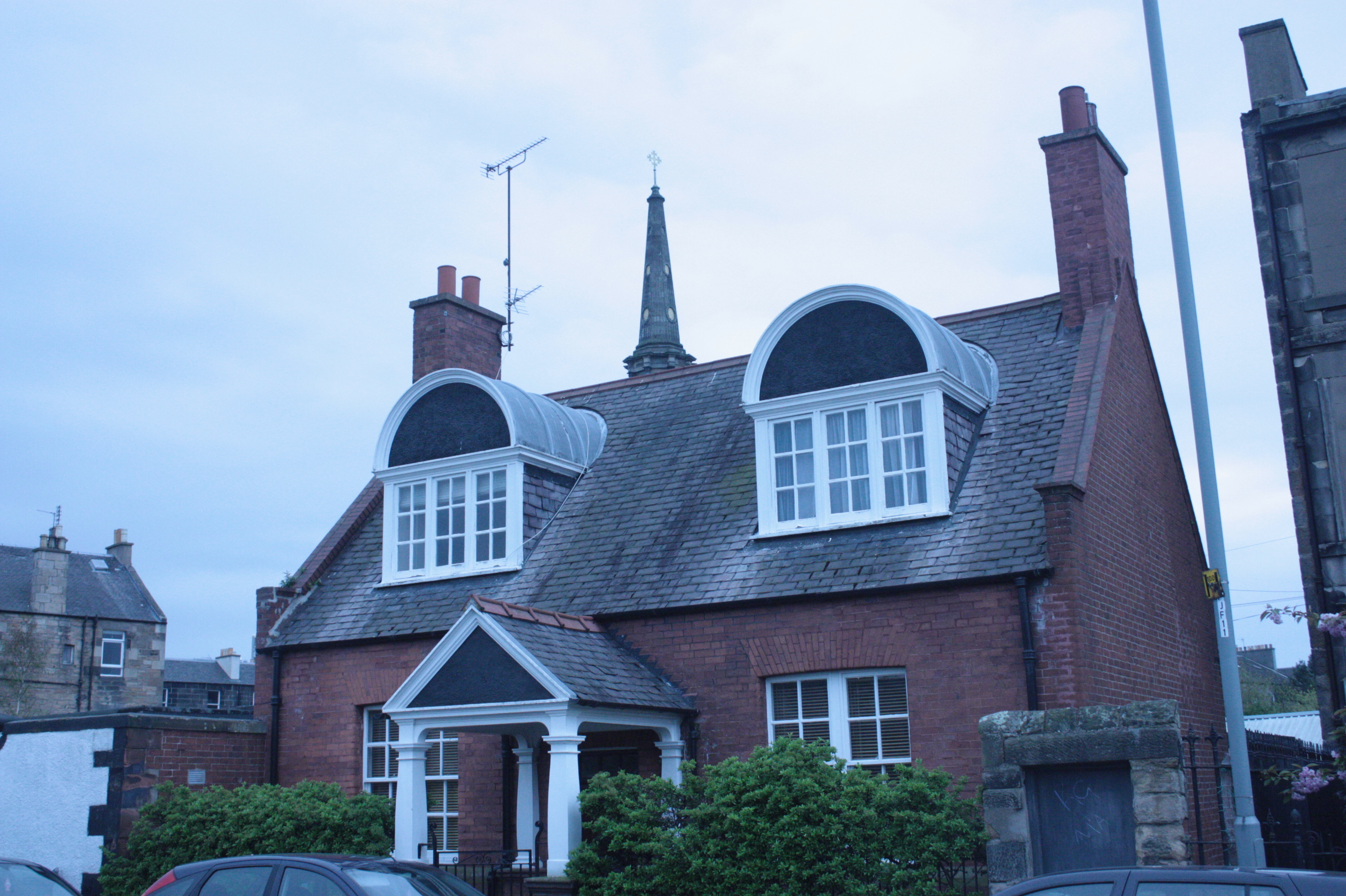
John Rhind's house designed by his young brother Thomas Duncan Rhind, Portland St, Leith

Sir Thomas Duncan Rhind KBE (14 July 1871 – 24 April 1927) was a Scottish architect and military figure. He was knighted in 1919 for services to his country.

== Life ==
Thomas was the son of John Rhind a prominent Edinburgh sculptor. His older brothers William Birnie Rhind and John Massey Rhind each followed in their father’s footsteps to become sculptors.

Thomas instead chose architecture and after being educated at George Watson’s College he went to train as an architect under Hippolyte Blanc - an important Edinburgh architect specialising in churches. He stayed in his employment from 1887 to 1892.

He obtained a post with the London County Council Architectural Department briefly before moving to the firm of Gibson & Russell. He was elected ARIBA at the very young age of 24, a reflection upon his skills.

In 1898 he formed a partnership with a former student friend Robert Hamilton Paterson. This lasted only until 1906 and he thereafter practiced alone. In 1902 he married Mary Elizabeth Gilbert, eldest daughter of W. Matthews Gilbert, then the chief reporter of The Scotsman newspaper.

Clearly with family influence his work was highly sculptural, often working directly with family members to ornament a building.

== Military career ==
He was a keen military volunteer and ranked as Major in the local volunteers. He was awarded the Territorial Decoration (TD). At the outbreak of the First World War he was appointed Commandant of Redford Barracks which then partially operated as a prisoner of war camp for German captives. His architectural work completely ceased at this point. In 1917 he was promoted to Brevet Lieutenant Colonel and appointed Assistant Adjutant General to the London-Scottish Regiment. Thereafter he adopted a role in the War Office in London under the Director of Recruiting, Sir Andrew Geddes. At the end of the war he was appointed Controller of Statistics to the Ministry of National Service, and subsequently rose to be Chief Controller. He was appointed a Commander of the Order of the British Empire in the 1918 New Year Honours for his efforts during the First World War.

In 1919, he was knighted as a Knight Commander of the Order of the British Empire (KBE).

He died in 1927 in a nursing home in Hove, Sussex indicating some infirmity had arisen as he was only 56. He is buried with his parents in Warriston Cemetery in Edinburgh.

== Family ==
His wife, Mary Elizabeth Gilbert, died in London 25 April 1925 and is buried with her parents in Grange Cemetery, Edinburgh.

== Architectural works ==
- Cottage at 87 Portland Street, Leith for his brother John (1891)
- Villa ("Norham") for his brother William at North Berwick (1895)
- Villa ("Glenorchy") at North Berwick (1897)
- Shop and Tearoom for Macvitties Guest & Co. 135-136 Princes St, Edinburgh (1900)
- Premises on Randolph Place, Edinburgh (1900)
- Villa, 9 Succoth Gardens, Edinburgh (1900)
- Villa, "The Hollies", Barnton Avenue, Edinburgh (1900)
- Premises 83 George St, Edinburgh (1901)
- Queen Victoria Memorial, Liverpool (1902)
- South African War Memorial, Hawick (1903) (sculpted by William Birnie Rhind)
- Royal Scots memorial to losses in the Boer War, St. Giles Cathedral, Edinburgh (1903)
- St. Rules, Dunbar (1903)
- 1 Wester Coates Gardens, Edinburgh (1907)
