= William Birnie Rhind =

Scottish sculptor (1853–1933)

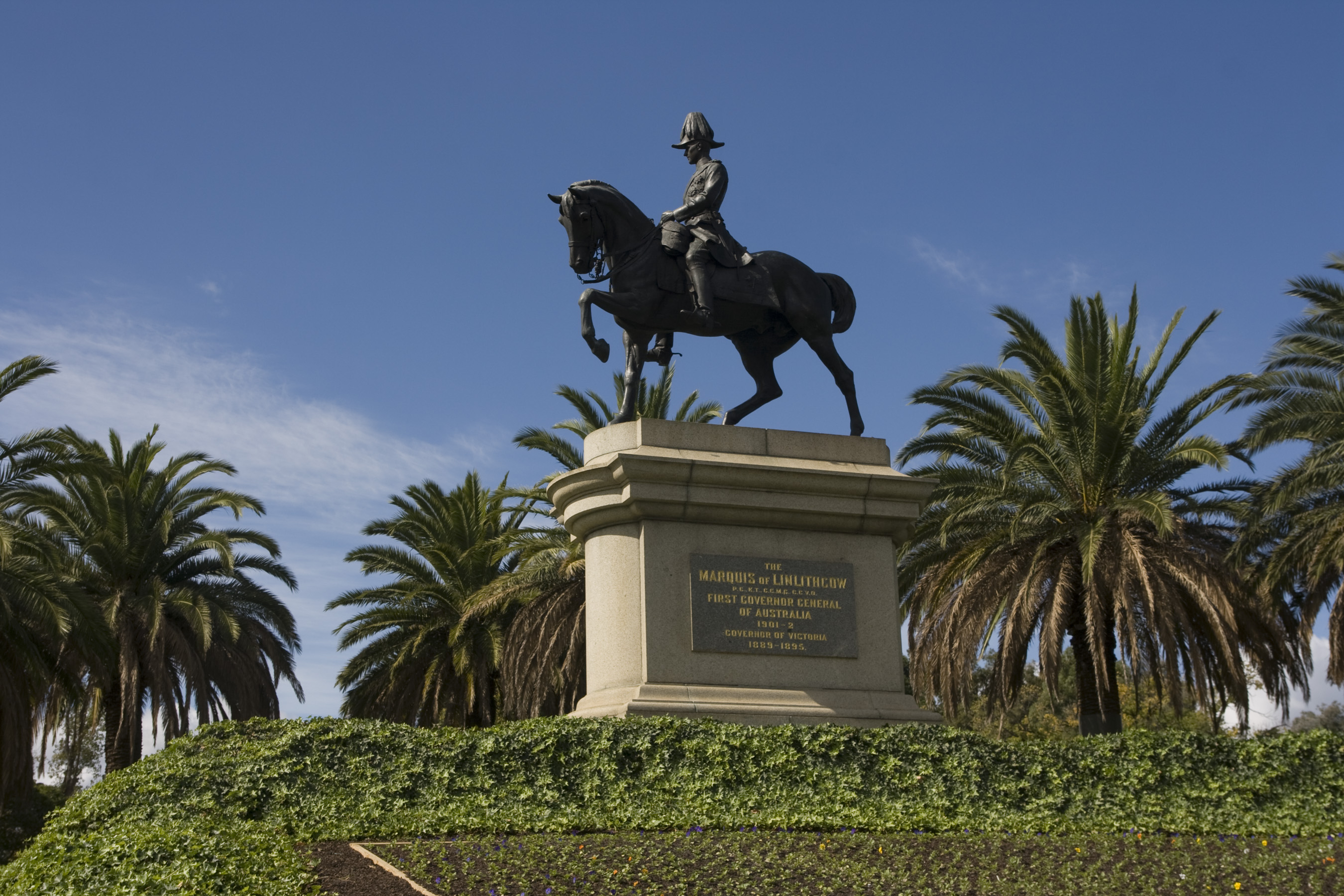
Statue of Marquess of Linlithgow in Melbourne

William Birnie Rhind RSA (1853–1933) was a Scottish sculptor.

== Life ==
Rhind was born in Edinburgh on 27 February 1853 as the first son of sculptor John Rhind (1828–1892), and his wife, Catherine Birnie. He was the elder brother of J. Massey Rhind. The two brothers set up a studio in Glasgow in 1885, then Birnie moved to Edinburgh, and his brother went to Paris, then permanently to America in 1889, despite the warnings of their father. His younger brother was Thomas Duncan Rhind, an architect.

His name is particularly connected to several dozen sculptural war memorials in the Edinburgh and Lothian area. One of these is a monument to the Royal Scots Greys on Princes Street in Edinburgh. Also of note is the 1919 bronze figure of a fallen officer, telling his men to "carry on", which acts as the school war memorial at Fettes College, a private school in Edinburgh.

William died on 9 July 1933 and was buried with his parents, and Alice Stone, his wife, in the family plot in Warriston Cemetery, Edinburgh.

== Works ==
- "Virtue" panels on the memorial to the Duke of Buccleuch in front of St. Giles Cathedral, Edinburgh, 1887
- Lifeboat Monument, St Anne's on the Sea, 1888
- Sculpture on the Sun Life Insurance building in Glasgow (1889) commissioned by William Leiper
- Allegorical figures on Charing Cross Mansions, Glasgow, 1889–1891
- The Main Entrance Archway, West Ham Technical College, 1898
- Pulpit and font at St Mary's Collegiate Church, Haddington 1891
- Apollo Group, sculpture on the former Sun Life Building, Glasgow, 1889–1894
- Figures of angels and apostles inside Bellevue Reformed Baptist Church, East London Street, Edinburgh, 1894
- Pair of statues to Thomas and Peter Coats in Paisley, 1895
- Monument to Lord Belhaven and Stenton, Dean Cemetery, Edinburgh, 1896
- The seated figure of Science on the Kelvingrove Art Gallery and Museum, 1898
- Figures in niches on the Scottish National Portrait Gallery, Edinburgh, 1898
- West Ham Technical Institute, 1898 - 1900
- Sculptural figures on a large memorial in Roslin churchyard, 1899
- Bronze portrait head of Dr James Cappie (1829–1899) in Grange Cemetery, Edinburgh (1899)
- Allegorical figures on the Scotsman Building, Edinburgh, 1900 (above North Bridge Arcade)
- Figures and panel on the former National Bank of Scotland branch, Glasgow, 1902–1903
- Last Supper panel within St Paul's Church, Lorne Street, Leith, 1903
- Monument to Sir Hector MacDonald, Dean Cemetery, Edinburgh, 1904
- Monument to soldiers killed in the Boer Wars, Alloa, 1904 (to a design by Robert Lorimer)
- Statue of William Light, founder of Adelaide, South Australia, designed 1904 and unveiled 1906 in the city of Adelaide
- The River Mersey, Navigation, and Commerce, with sculptor Edward O. Griffith, formerly on the Liverpool Cotton Exchange, 1905–1906
- Frieze within the old Lothian Region Chambers on George IV Bridge in Edinburgh, 1905
- Heads on corbels, Corstorphine Old Parish Church, Edinburgh, 1905
- Science on the Armstrong Building, Newcastle, 1906
- Sculpture on the entrance tower of Hawick Public Library 1906
- Monument to the King's Own Scottish Borderers on North Bridge, Edinburgh, 1906
- Monument of horse and rider to the Royal Scots Greys on Princes Street, Edinburgh, 1906
- Figures on the former R. W. Forsyth Department Store (corner of Princes Street and St. Andrew Street), Edinburgh, 1906
- Figure of St. Andrew on St. Andrew's Parish Church, North Berwick, 1907
- Monument to the Black Watch for the South African War (Boer War), The Mound, Edinburgh, 1908
- Monument to the poet Robert Burns, Montrose 1912
- Ashton Building at the University of Liverpool, 1912–1914
- City Arms on the Usher Hall, Edinburgh, 1914
- Allegory of Learning, two figures above portico of Shipley Art Gallery, Gateshead, 1917
- Four allegorical groupings representing Agriculture, Art, Industry and Learning at the base of the dome of the Manitoba Legislative Building, Winnipeg, 1918–1919
- Kelty War Memorial, 1921
- Buckie War Memorial, 1921
- New Brighton War Memorial, 1921
- Figure of a pensive soldier of 8th Battalion Royal Scots atop a commemorative plinth, Prestonpans War Memorial, 1922

== Gallery ==
Sculptures
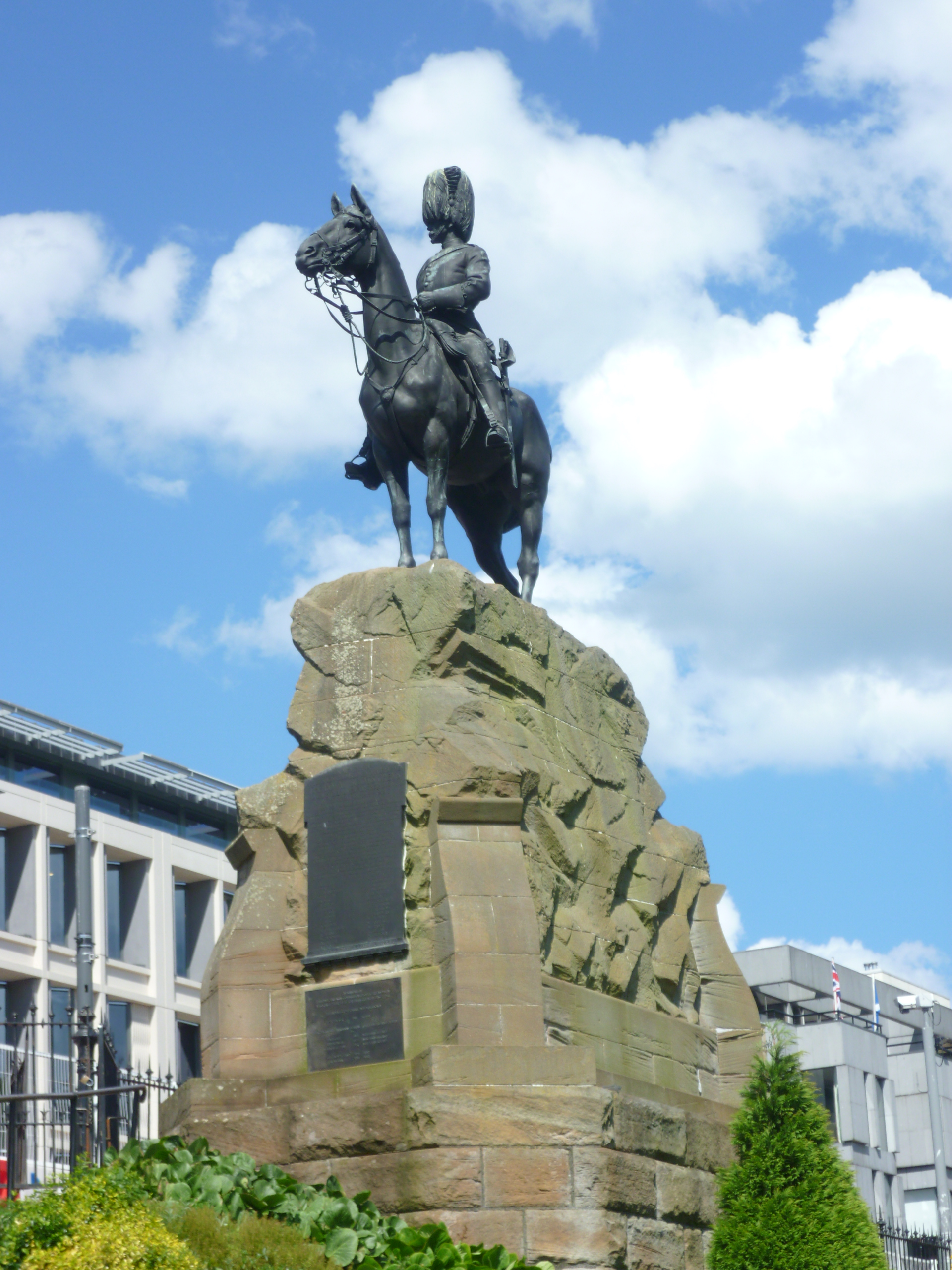
Monument to the Royal Scots Greys in Princes Street Gardens, Edinburgh

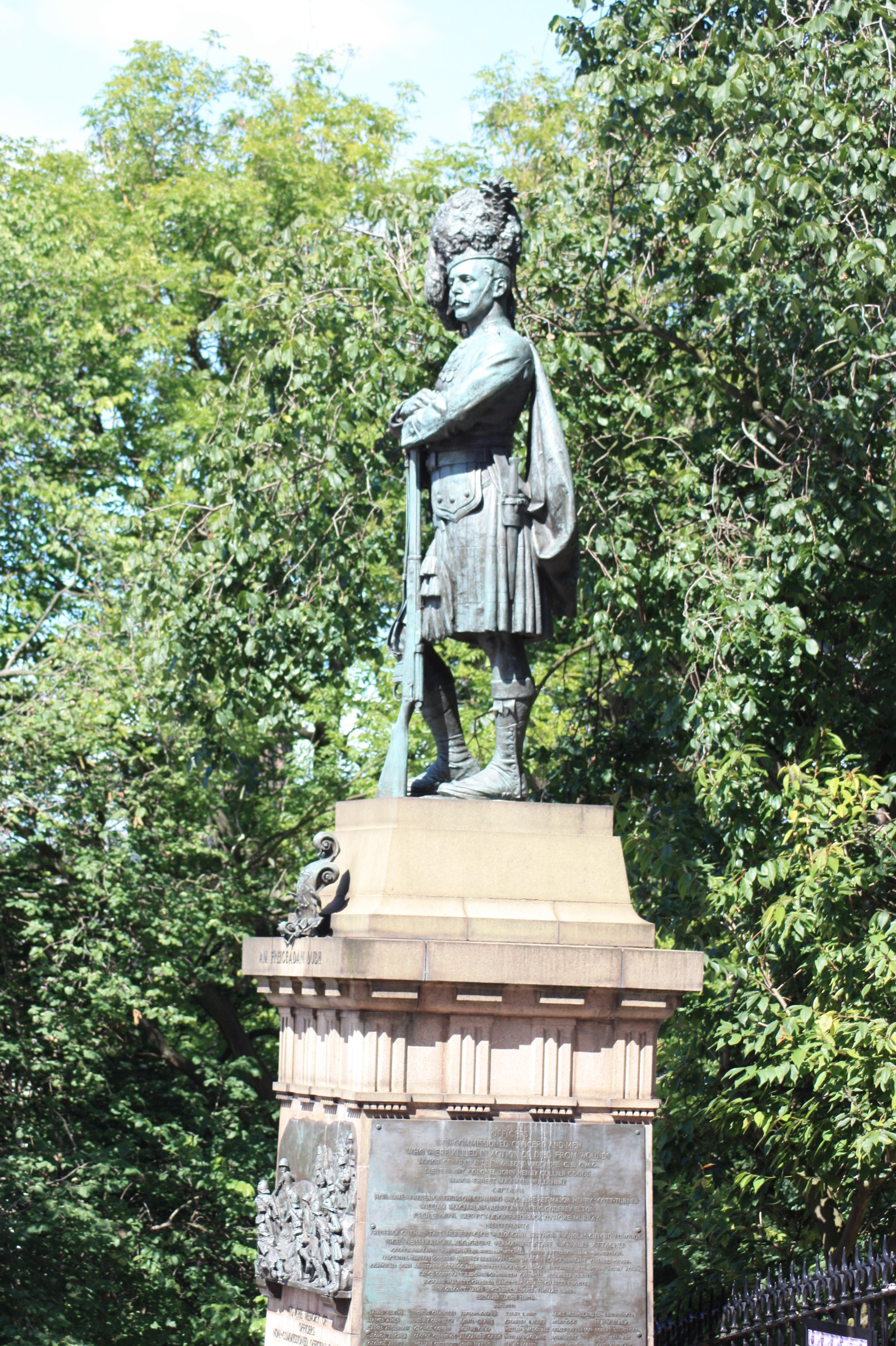
Black Watch Memorial, The Mound, Edinburgh

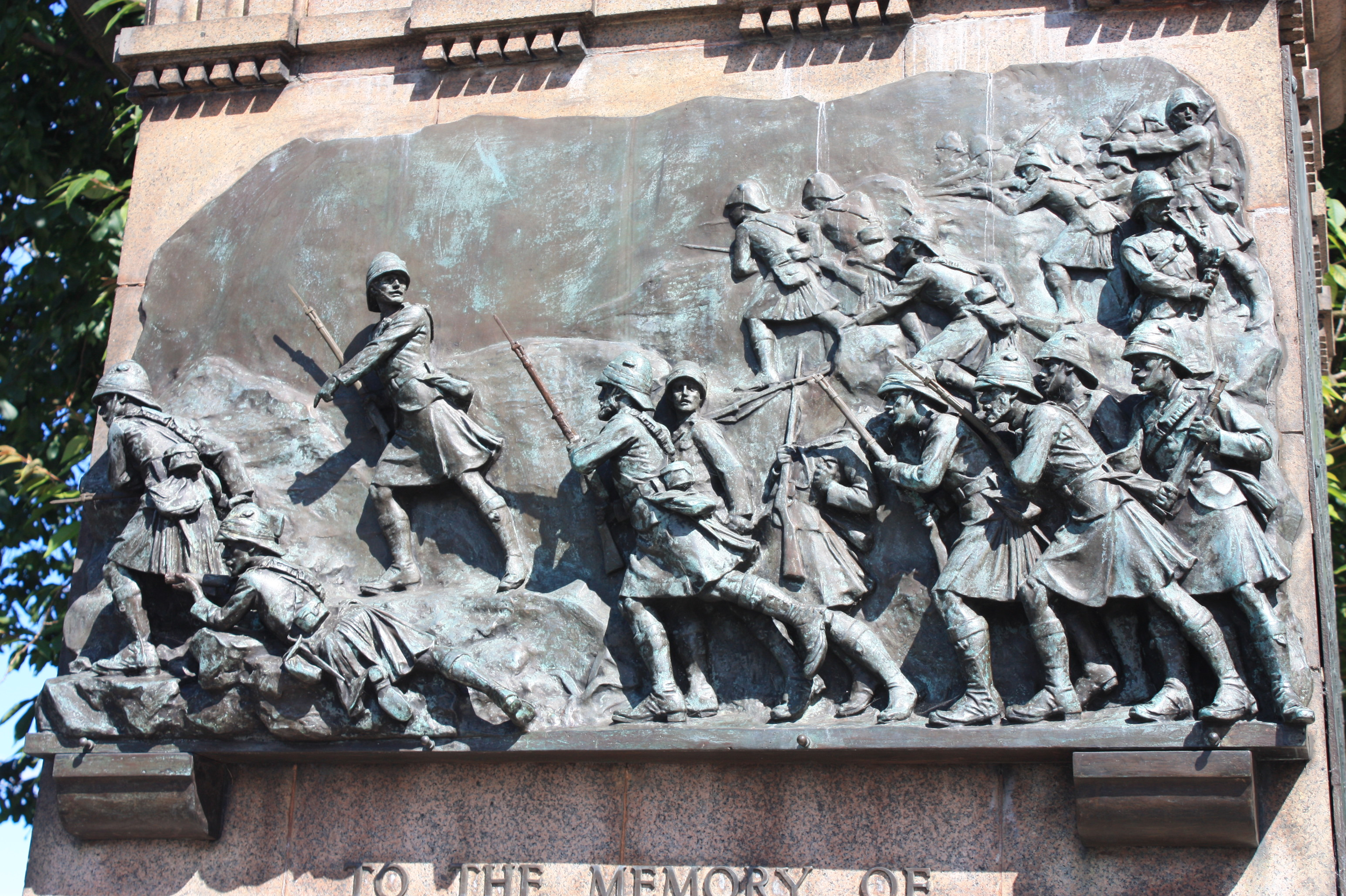
Detail of the Black Watch Memorial

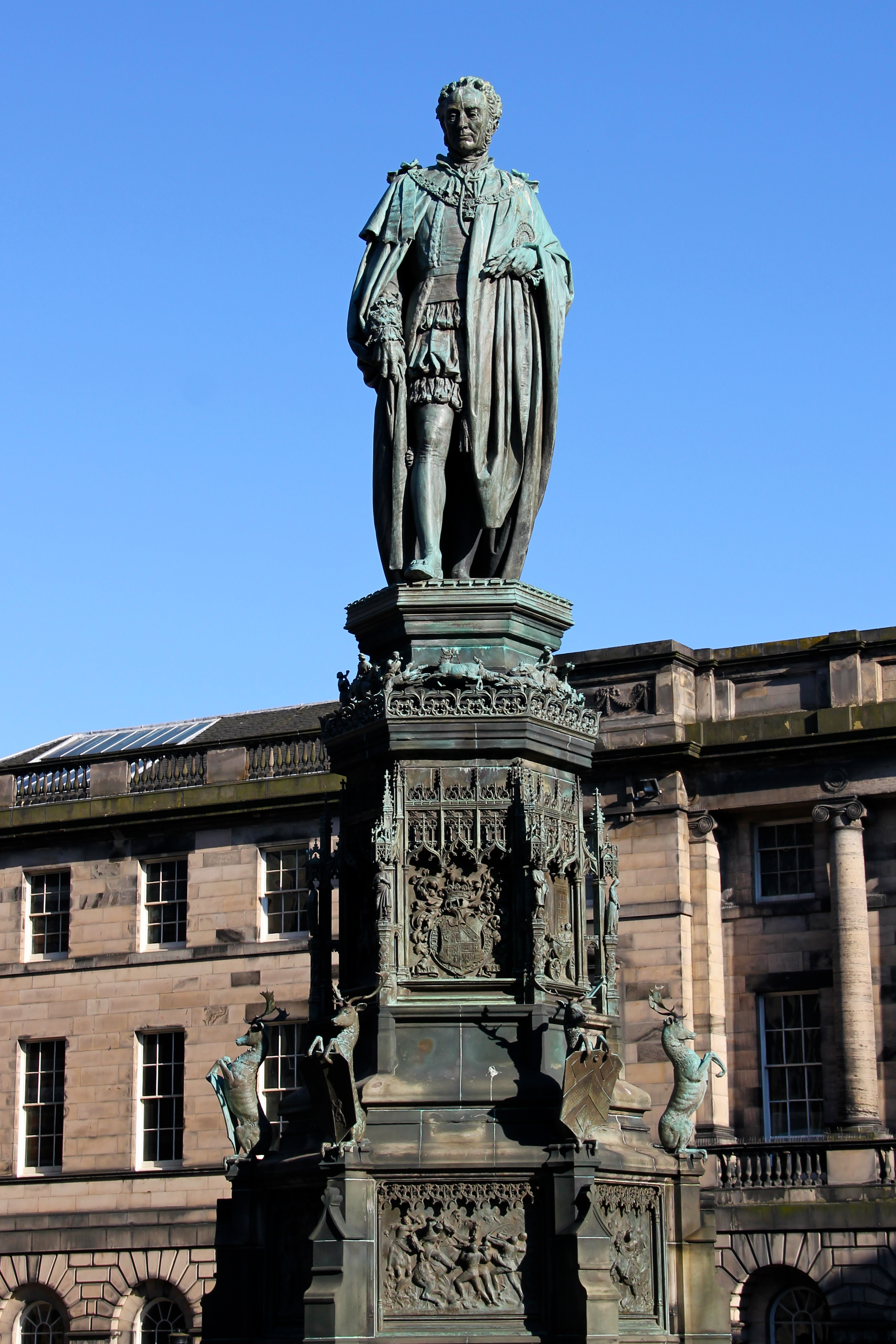
Statue of the 5th Duke of Buccleuch on Edinburgh's Royal Mile

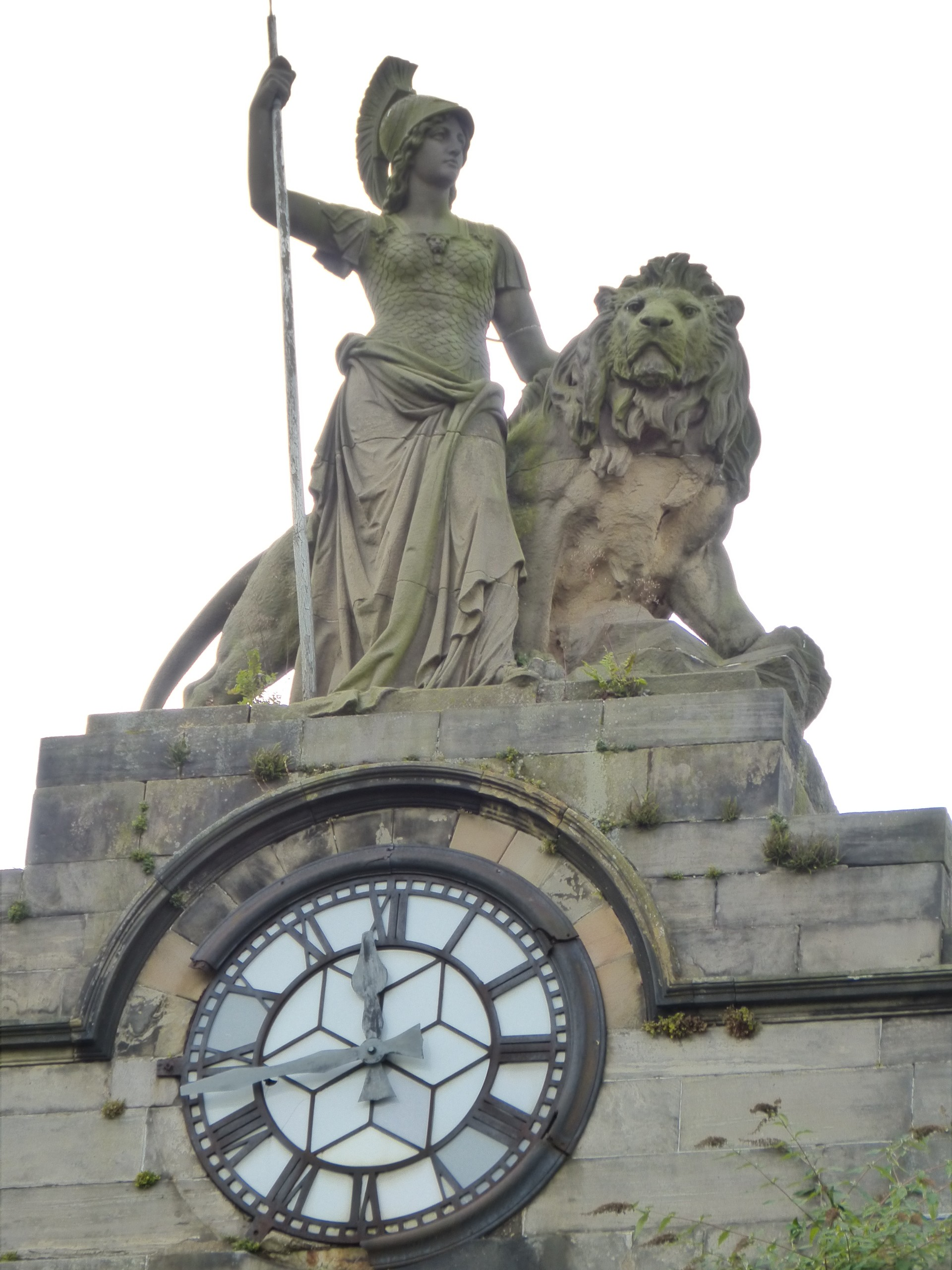
Sculpture of Britannia above a clock was added atop the Old Academy in Perth in 1886

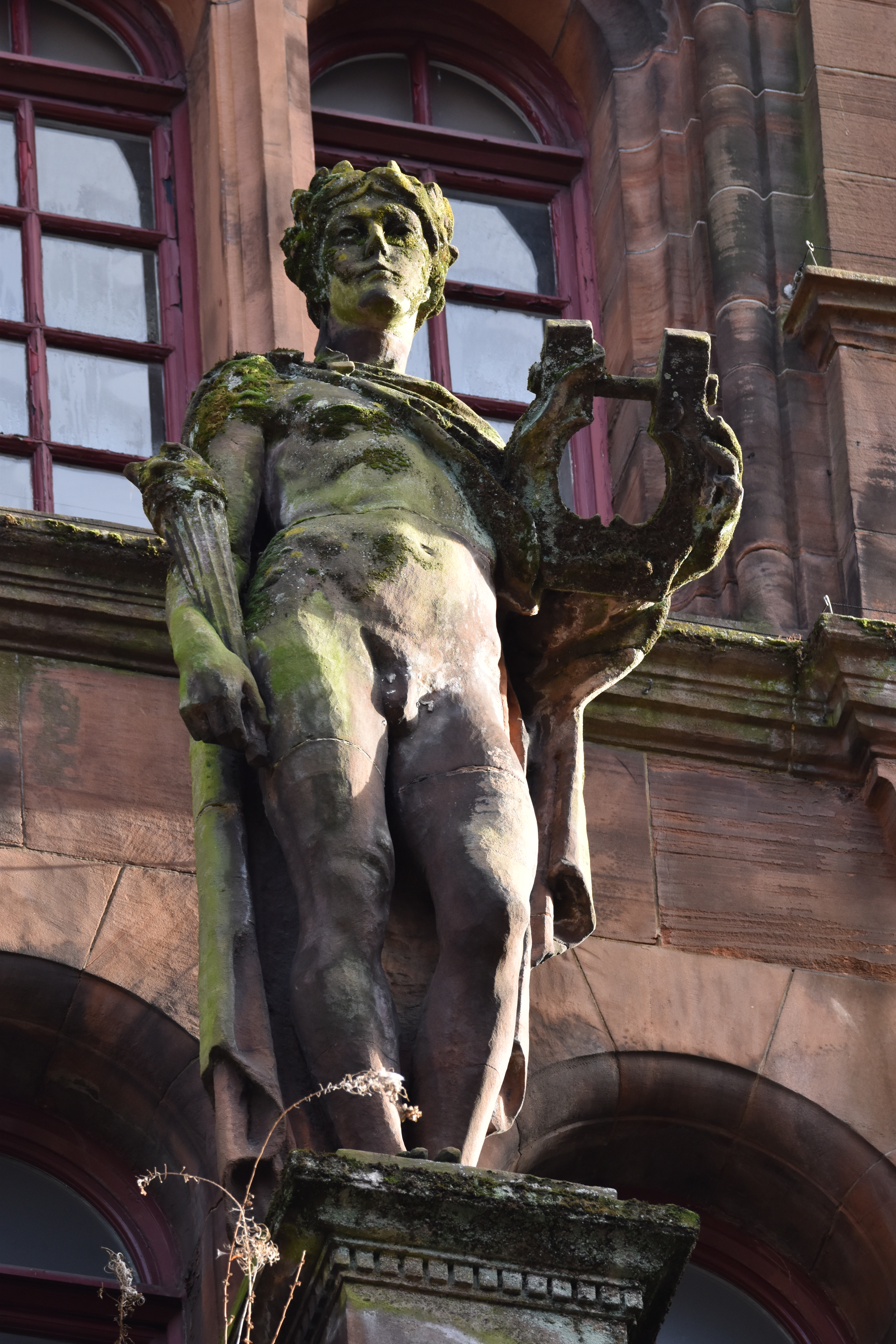
Apollo (1889-1894), Glasgow, former Sun Life Building, Renfield Street

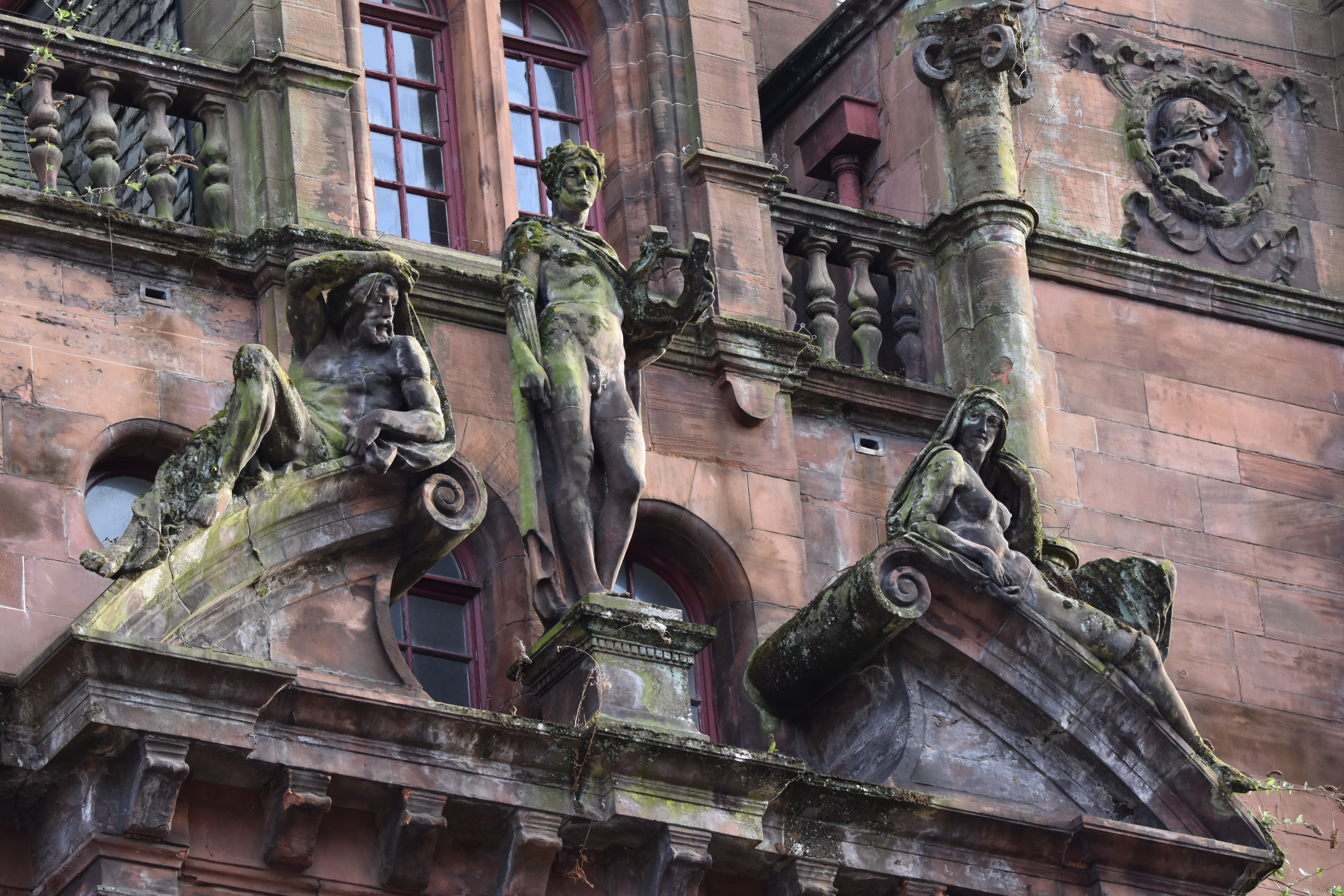
Apollo, Night and Day (1889-1894) Glasgow, former Sun Life Building, Renfield Street

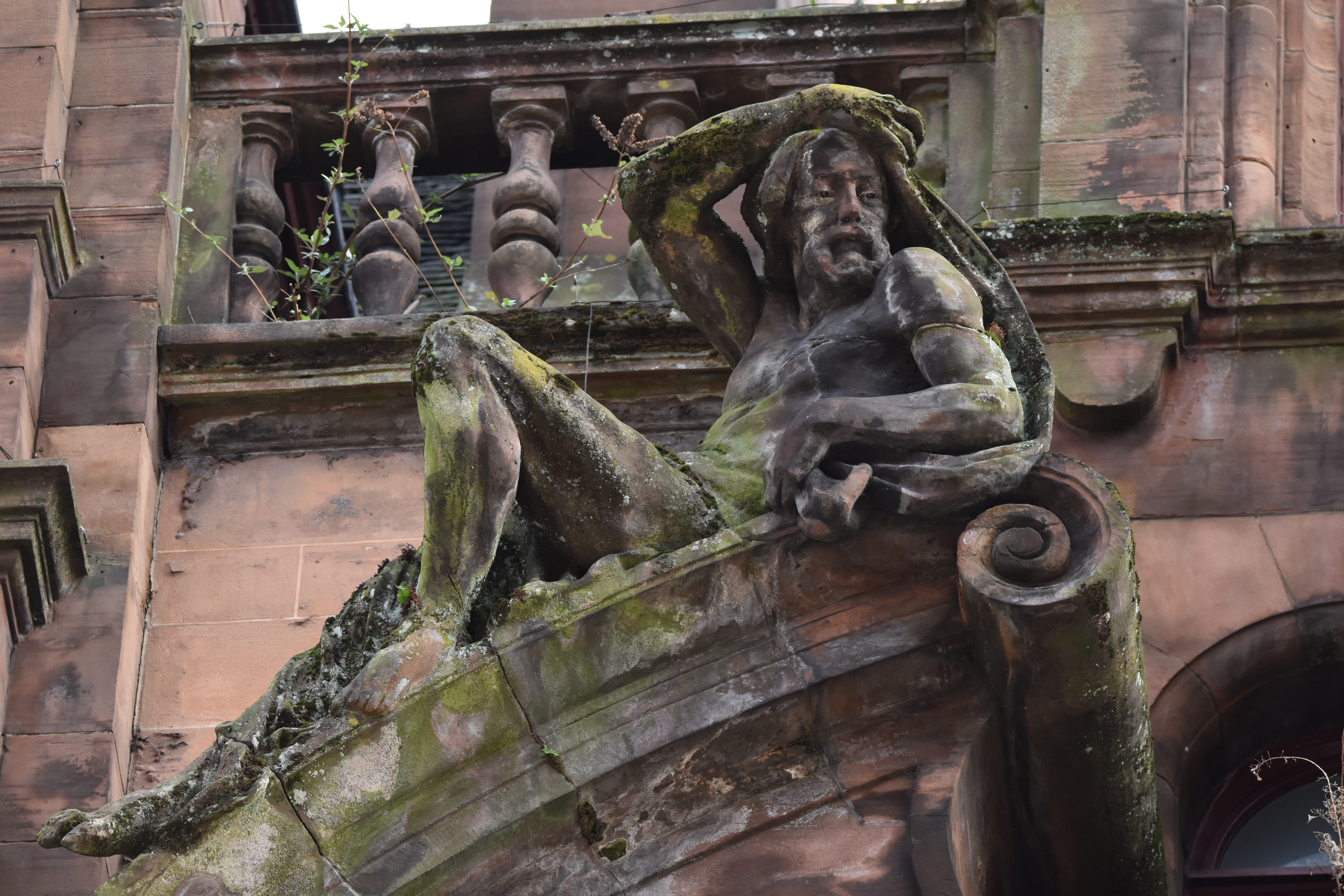
Night (1889-1894) Glasgow, former Sun Life Building, Renfield Street

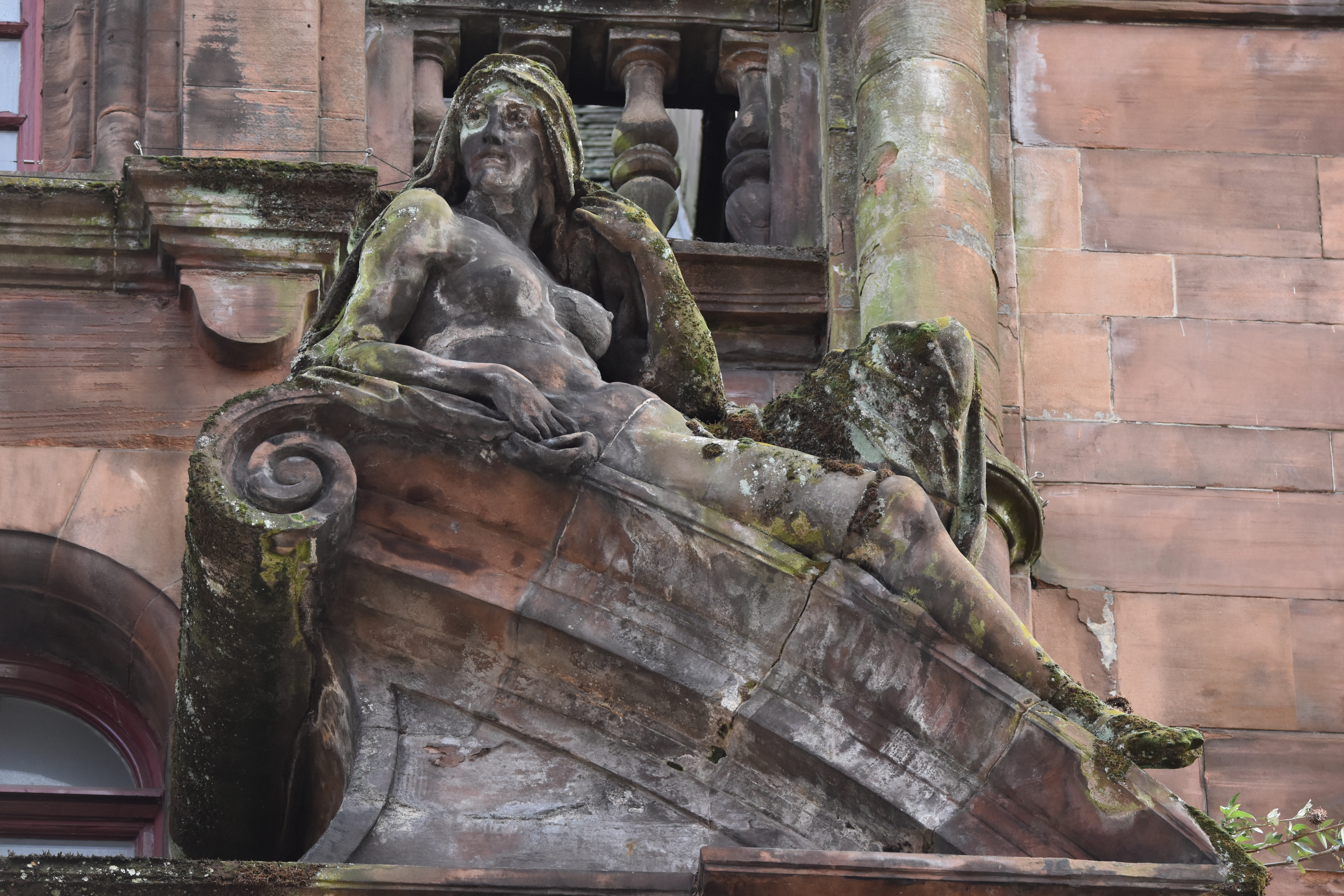
Day (1889-1894), Glasgow, former Sun Life Building, Renfield Street
