= John Rhind (sculptor) =

Scottish sculptor (1828–1892)

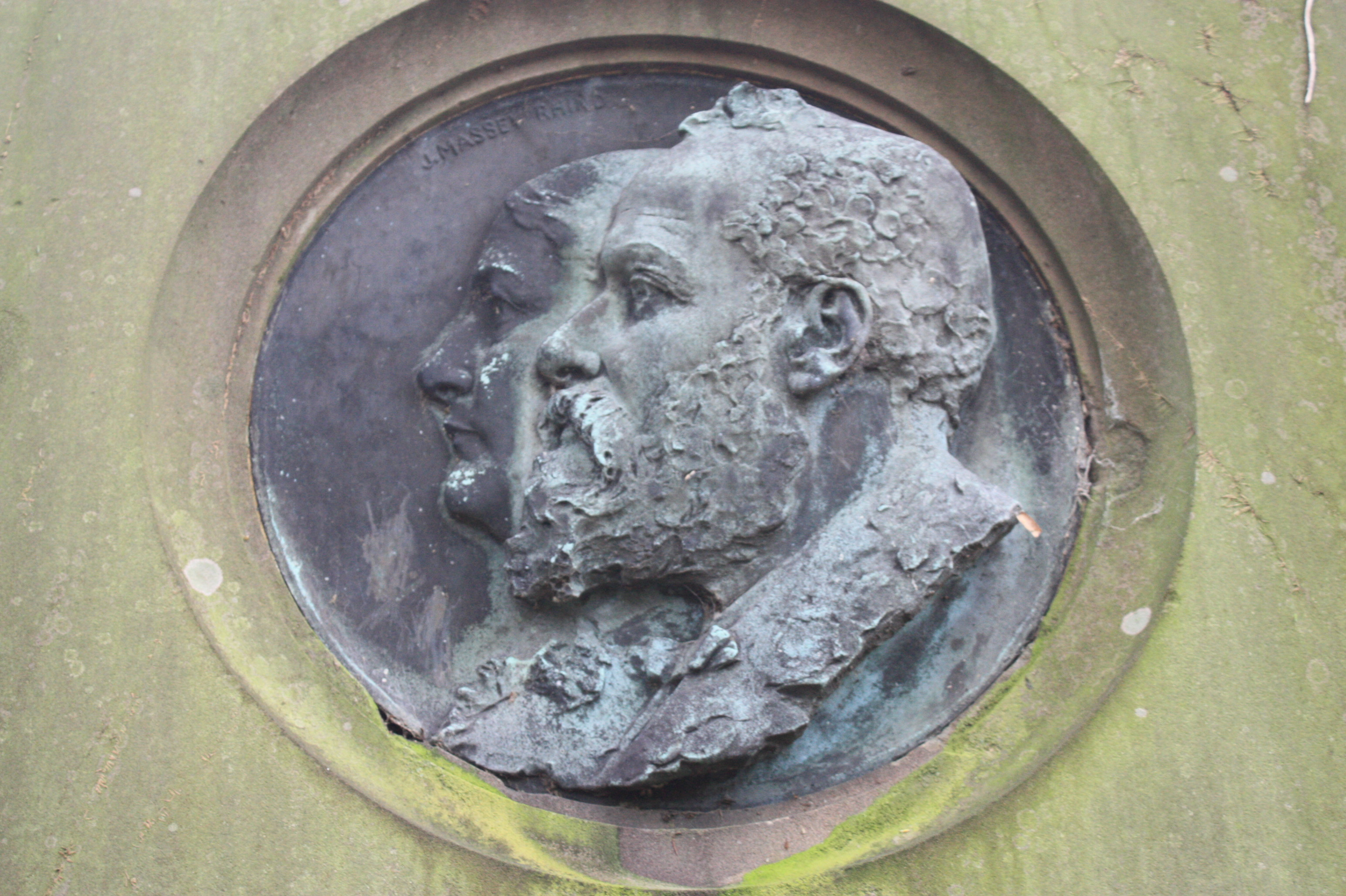
Medallion head of John Rhind and his wife on his grave in Warriston Cemetery Edinburgh

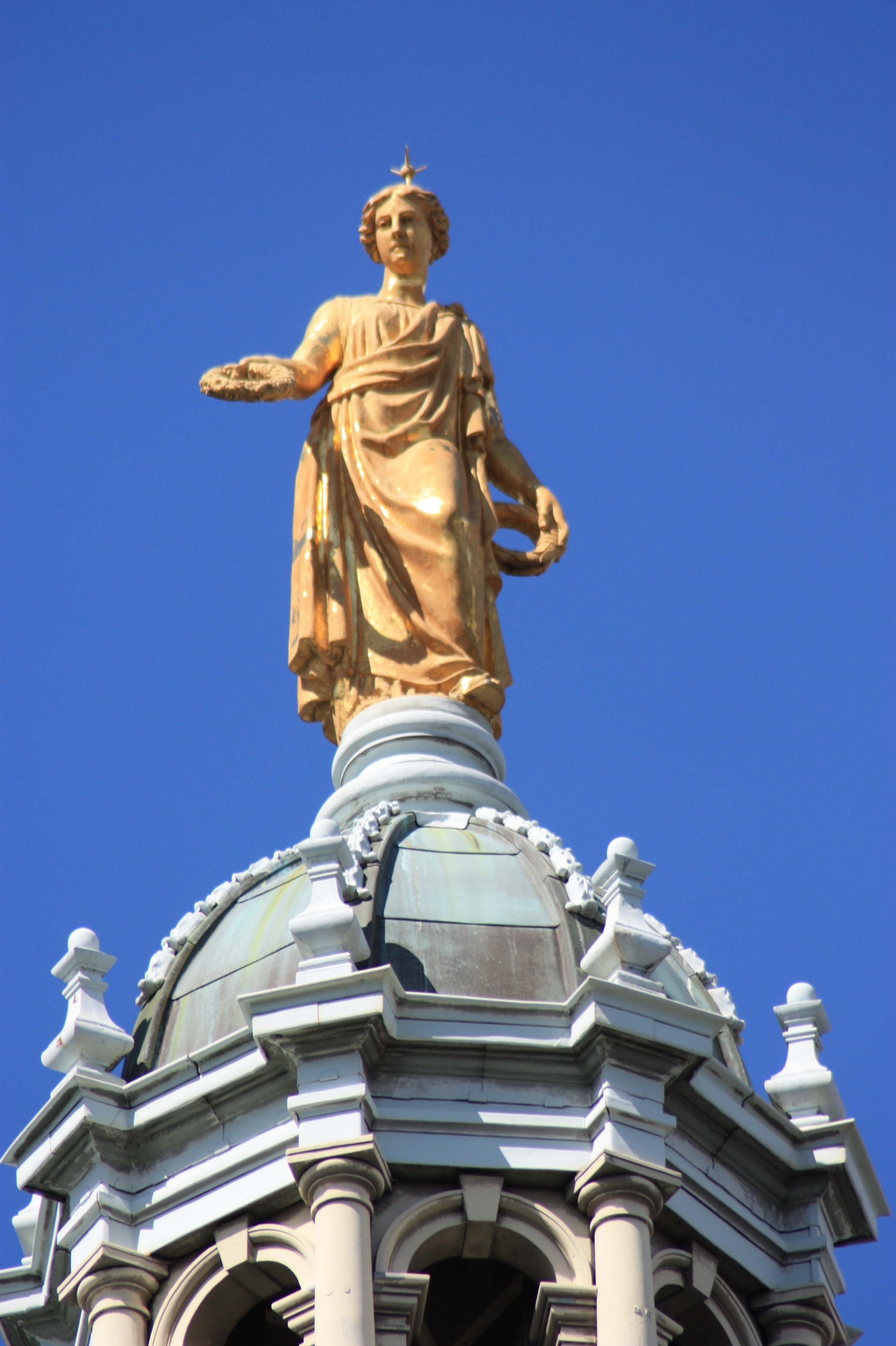
Golden statue of Fame on top of the main dome, Bank of Scotland Head Office, Edinburgh, by John Rhind

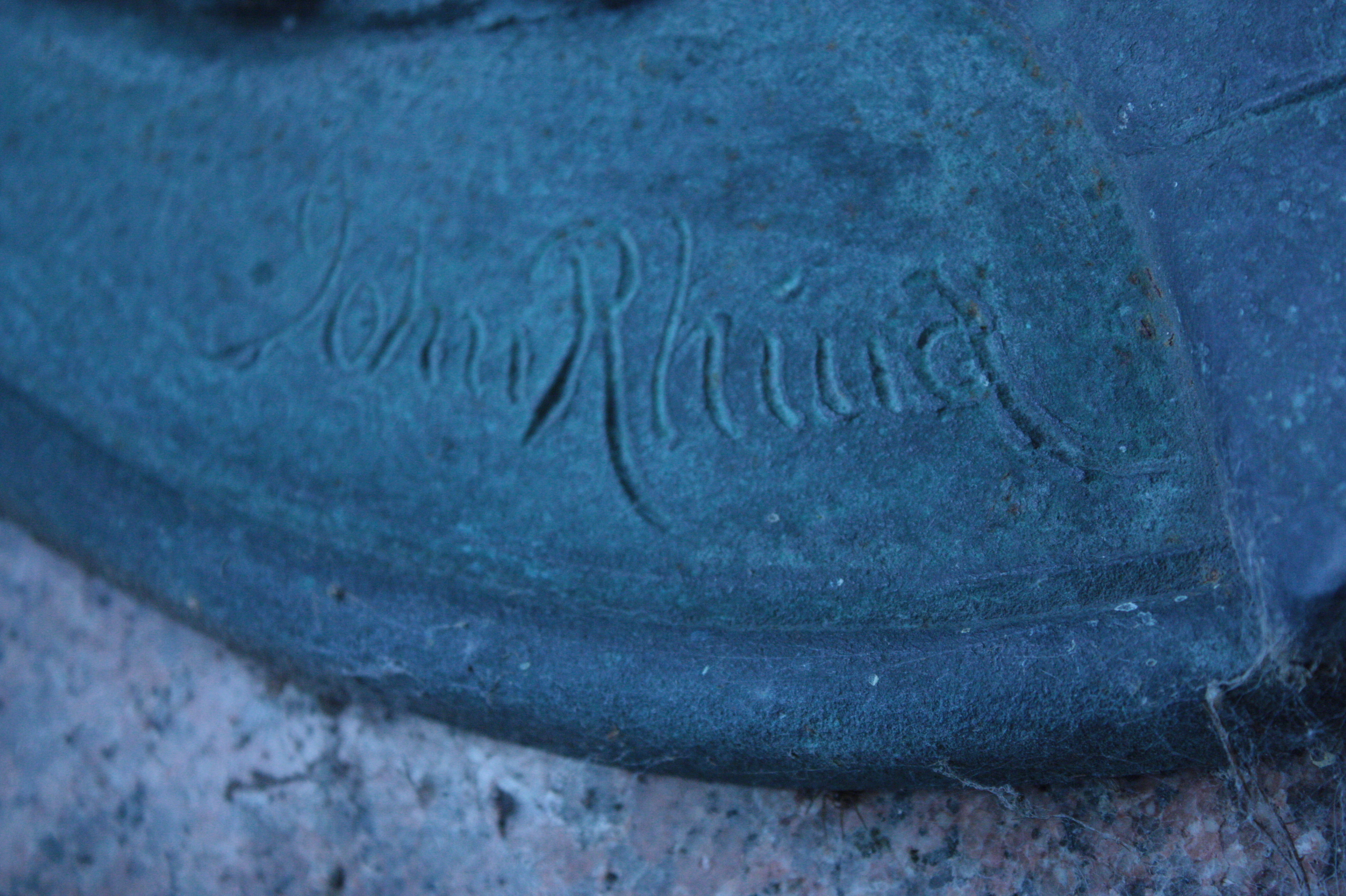
John Rhind's signature

John Rhind ARSA (1828–1892) was a Scottish sculptor, based in Edinburgh. He was born in Banff the son of a master mason. He was trained under Alexander Handyside Ritchie (1804–1870). He served this apprenticeship in a yard at 4 East Broughton Place.

He was master of the masonic lodge on Hill Street in Edinburgh from 1864 to 1868.

He lived his final years at "St Helens" on Cambridge Street, just south of Edinburgh Castle.

He died on 5 April 1892 a few days after being elected an Associate of the RSA, and is buried in Warriston Cemetery, Edinburgh, with a monument by his son John Massey Rhind. The grave lies just off the main southern path, near its centre, facing east on a north-south path.

He was the father of the sculptors William Birnie Rhind and J. Massey Rhind, and of the architect Sir Thomas Duncan Rhind.

== Works ==
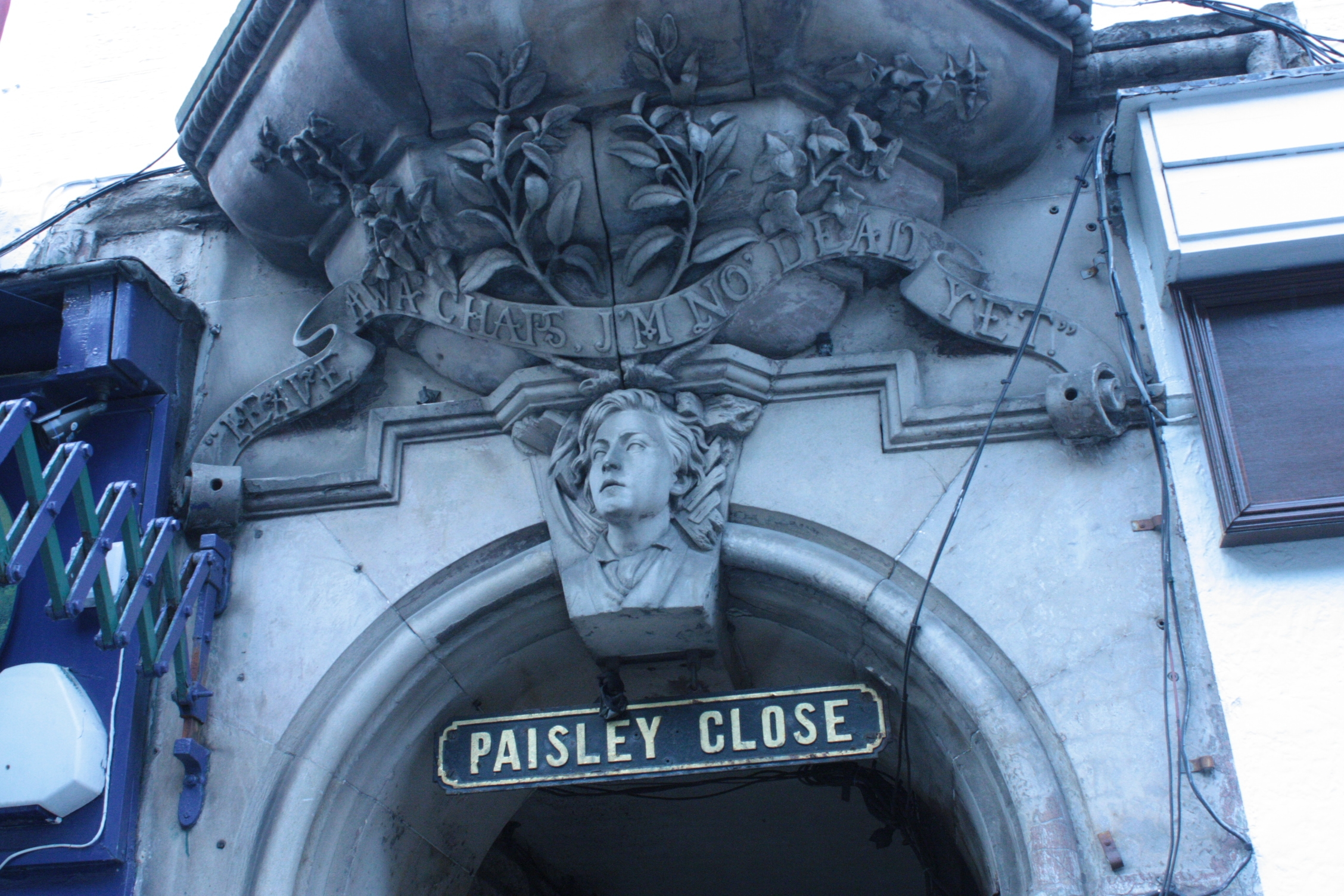
The carving at Paisley Close Edinburgh

- Portrait heads (Victoria, Albert, James Watt, Charles Darwin, Michelangelo, and Sir Isaac Newton), National Museum of Scotland, Chambers Street, Edinburgh (1859)
- Carving on West Bow Well, Grassmarket, Edinburgh, (1861).
- Sculpture of a head over Paisley Close on the Royal Mile, Edinburgh, (1862). The inscription "Heave Awa' Chaps I'm No Dead Yet" bears reference to the words which the 14-year-old boy (Joseph McIver) depicted cried out from the rubble from a collapsed tenement on the site.
- Leith Corn Exchange frieze, Constitution Street, Leith (1863)
- Sculpture of Greek goddess Nike atop the Bank of Scotland, Bank Street, Edinburgh (1864–70)
- Sculpture at Fettes College, Edinburgh (1864–70)
- Cornice carving on 128 Princes Street, Edinburgh (1866).
- The Catherine Sinclair Monument to the north-east of Charlotte Square, Edinburgh (1866–68). This is of the Eleanor Cross style.
- Celtic cross and bronze portrait to Alexander Smith, Warriston Cemetery, Edinburgh (1868) with Bronze medallion portrait by William Brodie.
- The unicorn figure on the head of the Mercat Cross on the Royal Mile, east of St. Giles Cathedral, Edinburgh (1869)
- Carvings at Fettes College, Edinburgh (1870)
- Purnell Family Monument, Sighthill Cemetery, Glasgow (c. 1872)
- Monument to John Buchanan, Dean Cemetery, Edinburgh (1872)
- Carving within the Bank of Scotland at 62–66 George St. Edinburgh (now "The Standing Order" public house) (1874–76).
- Biggar Memorial Fountain, Banff (1878)
- Huge monument to James Nasmyth and his family, Dean Cemetery, Edinburgh (1880)
- Font in Priestfield Church, Dalkeith Road, Edinburgh (1881).
- Several of the statue figures decorating the Scott Monument, Edinburgh (1882).
- Monument to Louisa Bingham, Countess of Wemyss in Aberlady Parish Church (1882). The recumbent effigy is described in "The Buildings of Lothian" as "chilling but pathetic nobility".
- Statue of Sir William Dick founder of the Dick Vet College in Edinburgh, within the college at Summerhall, Edinburgh (1883).
- Tableau group of animals (horses, cow etc) above entrance of New Veterinary College on Leith Walk in Edinburgh (1883)
- Pulpit and font at octagonal crossing St. Giles Cathedral, Edinburgh (1883)
- Sculpture around the main west door of St. Giles Cathedral, Edinburgh (1884)
- Eight Allegorical Female Figures (1883–88), Glasgow City Chambers
- Four allegorical figures (May, Flora, Aurora and Venus) on the fireplace of the Great Hall, Edinburgh Castle.
- Statue of Sir William Chambers, Chambers Street, Edinburgh (1888–91), assisted by William Shirreffs
- Bronze medallion tablet memorial to William Hay (died 1888), St. Giles Cathedral Edinburgh (1890)
- Sculpture at the Scottish National Portrait Gallery, Queen Street, Edinburgh (1891)
- Portrait bust of Henry Snell Gamley (sculptor) (exhibited in RGIFA, 1892)
- Agriculture and shipbuilding reliefs, New County Hall, Paisley (c. 1892)

== Gallery ==
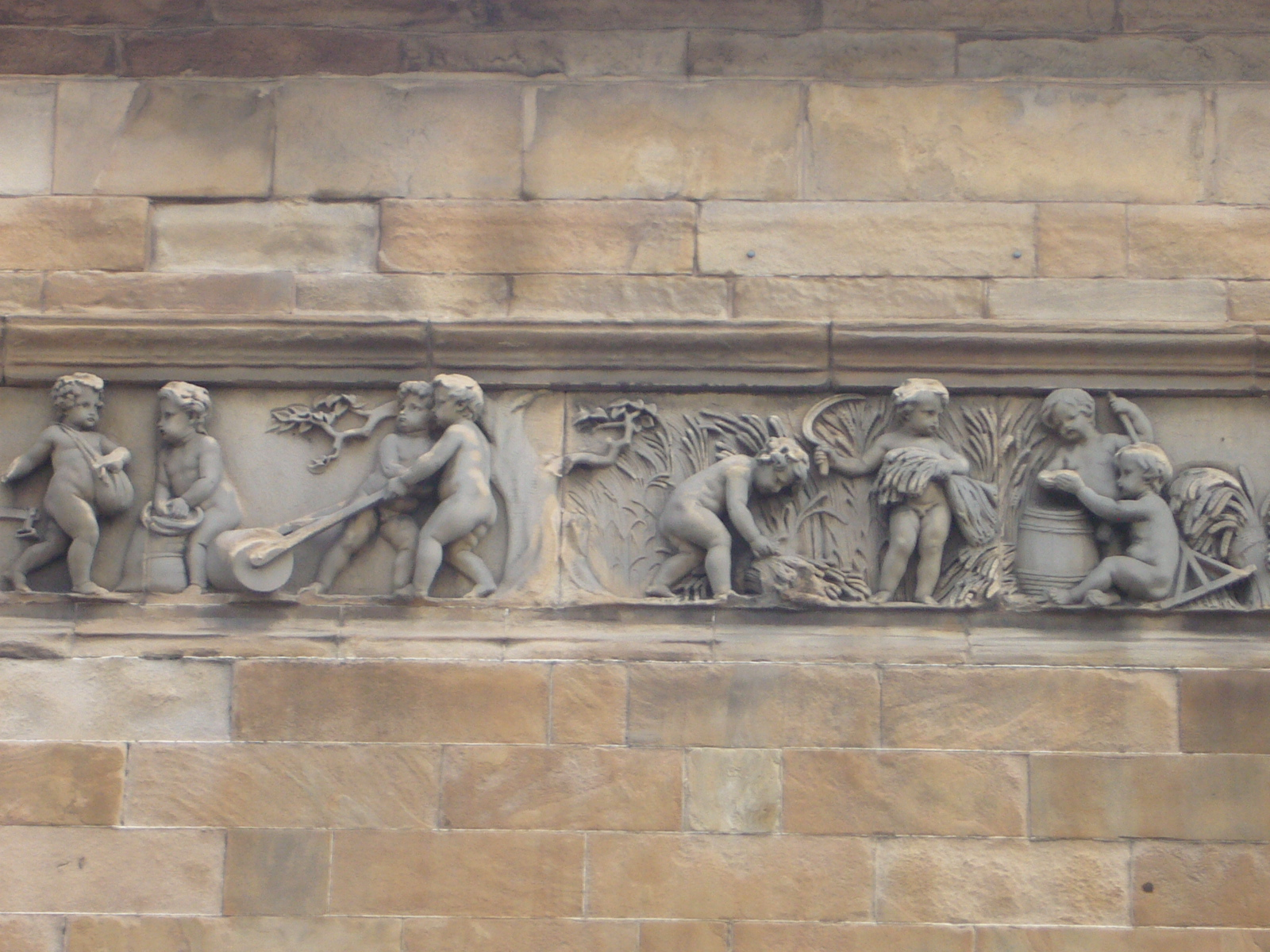
Leith Corn Exchange frieze: sowing and harvesting

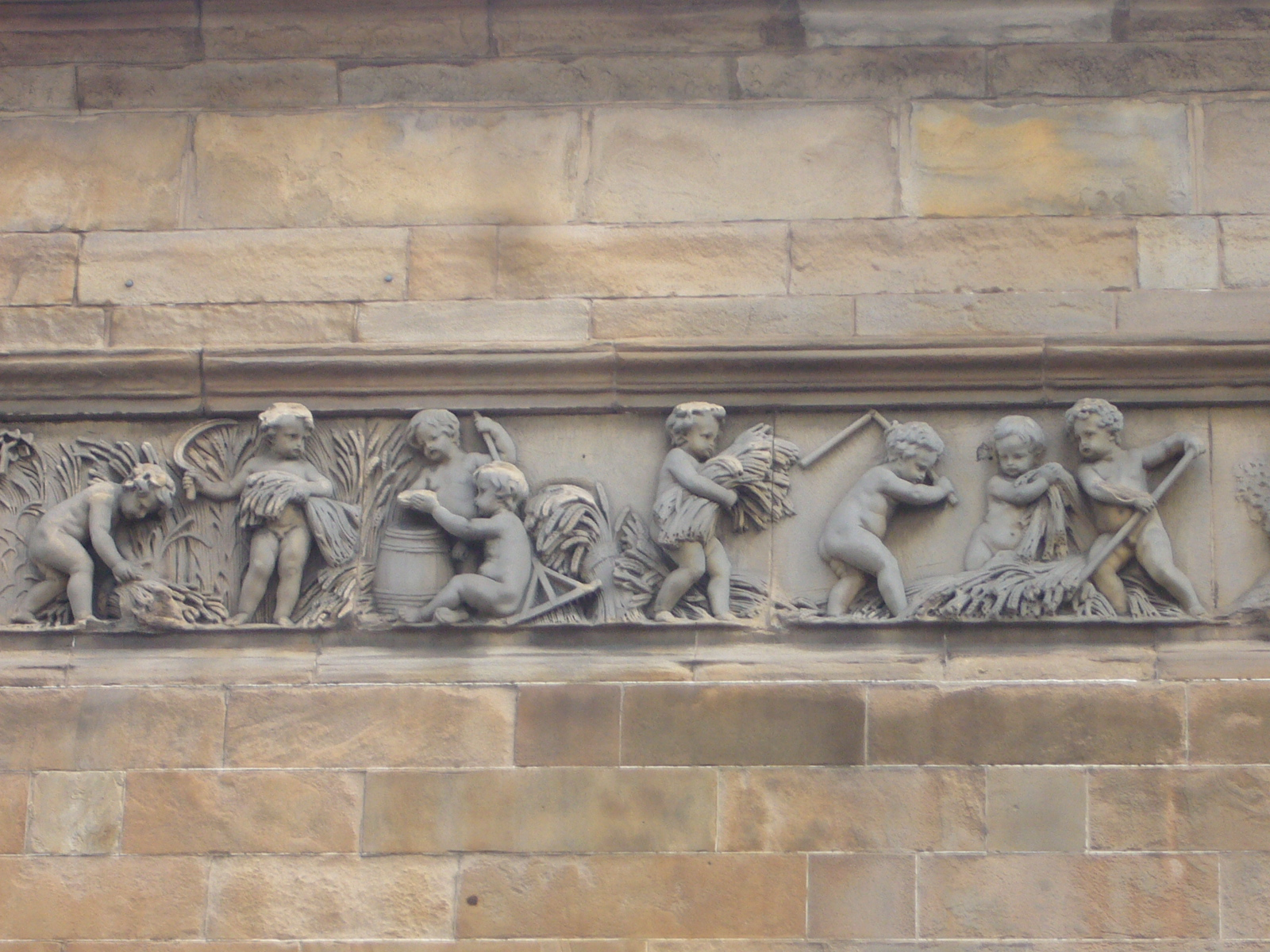
Leith Corn Exchange frieze: reaping and threshing

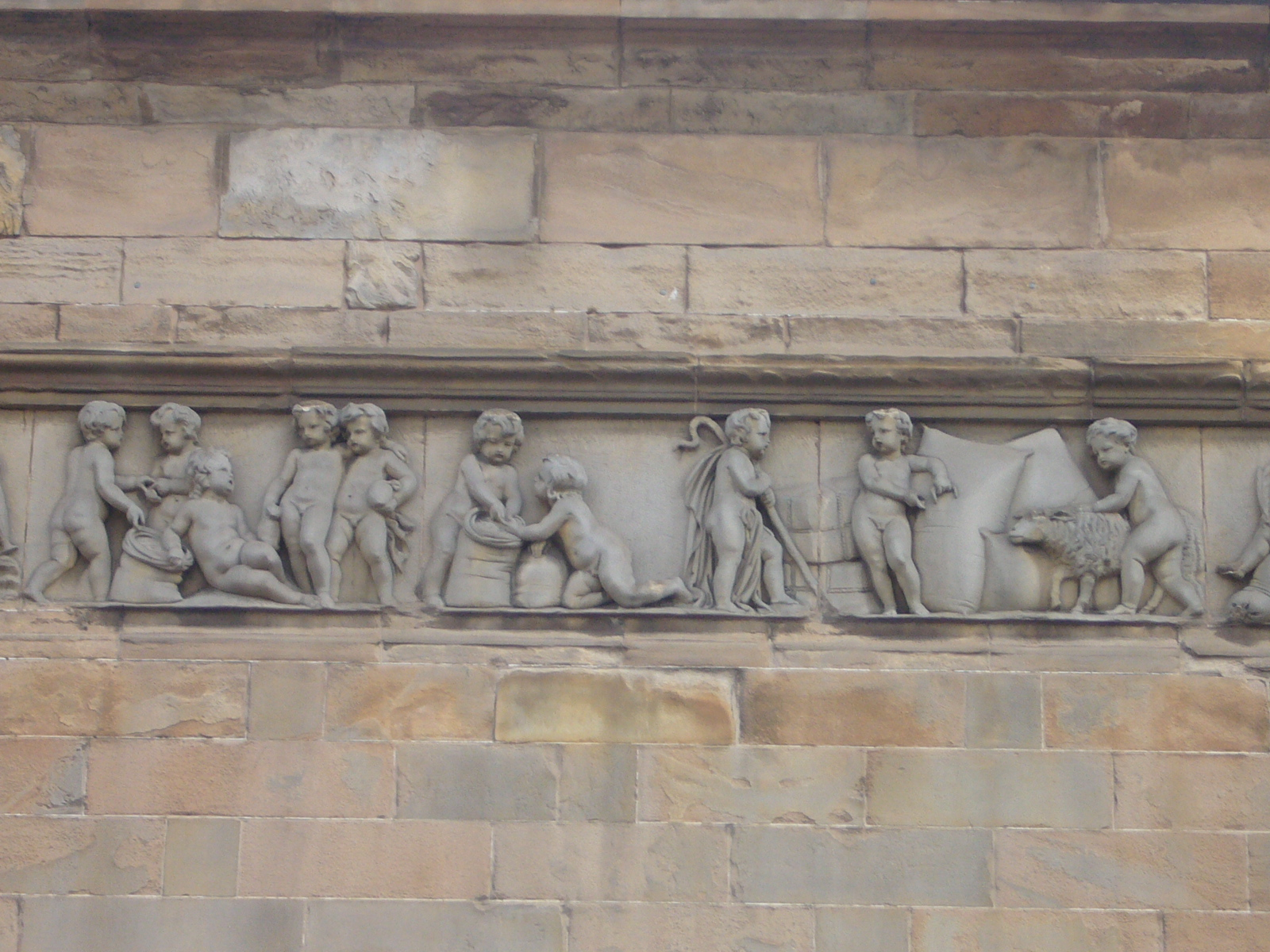
Leith Corn Exchange frieze: celebrating the harvest and shearing sheep

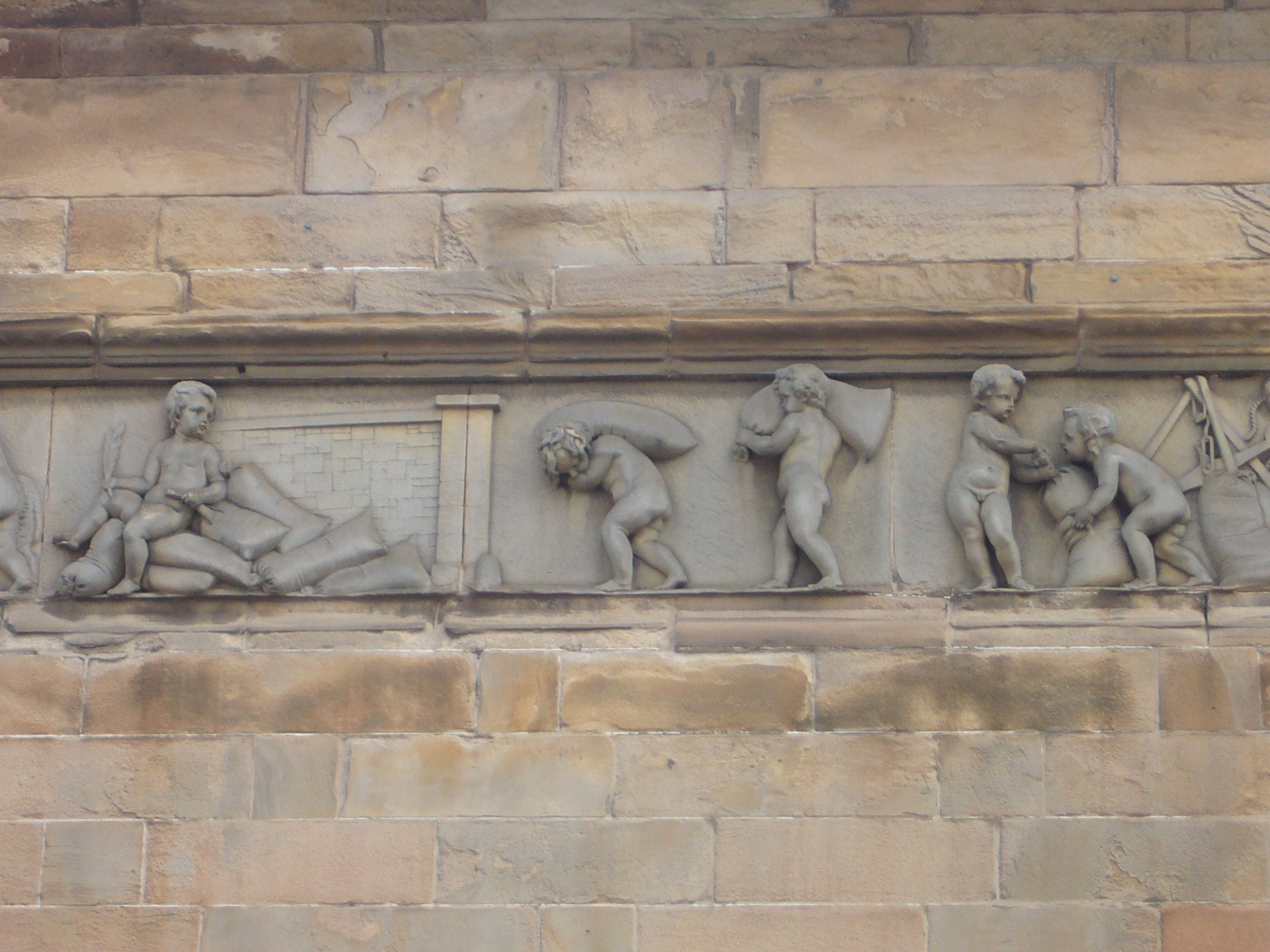
Leith Corn Exchange frieze: counting woolpacks and carrying imports

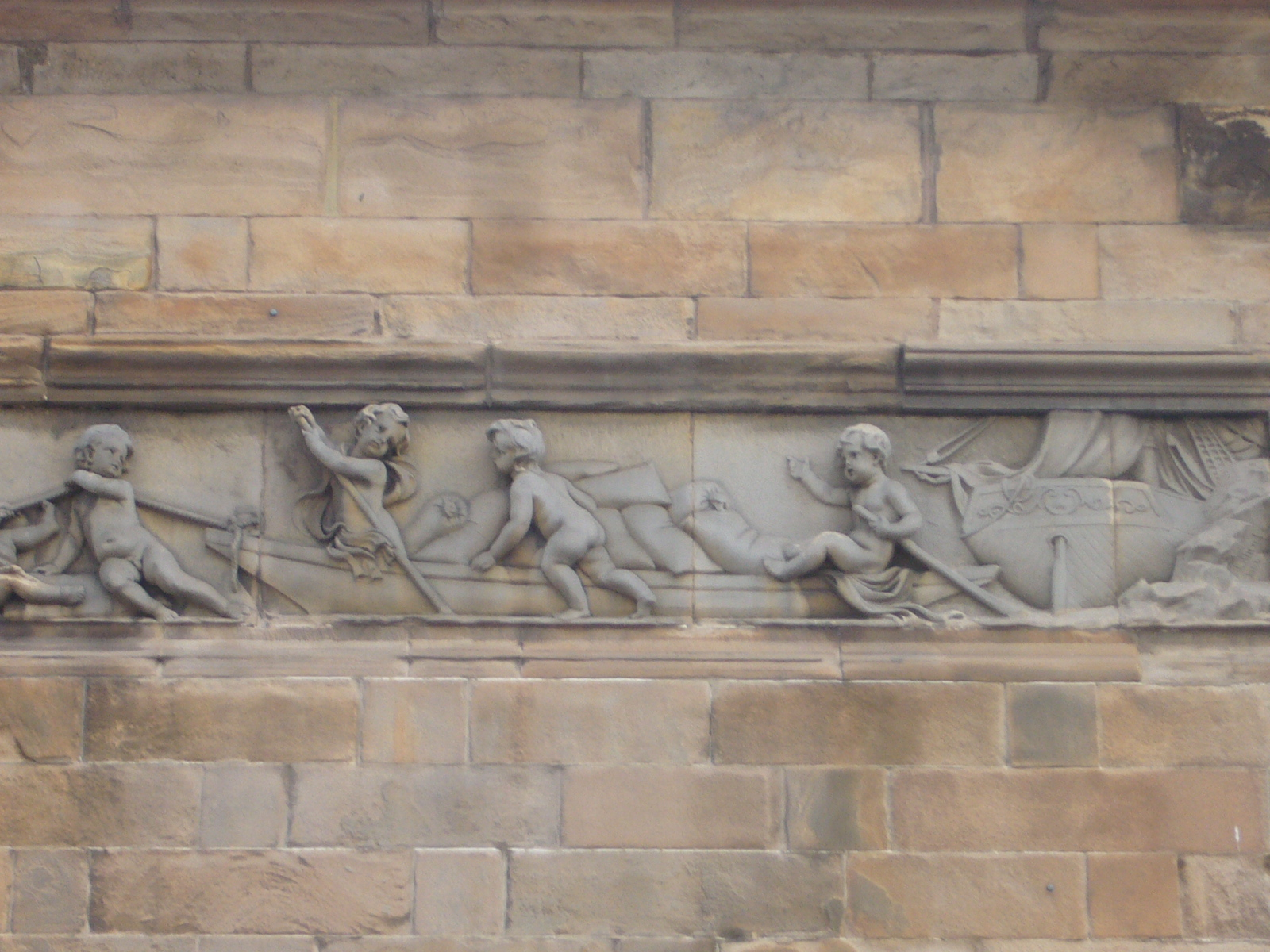
Leith Corn Exchange frieze: importing cereals

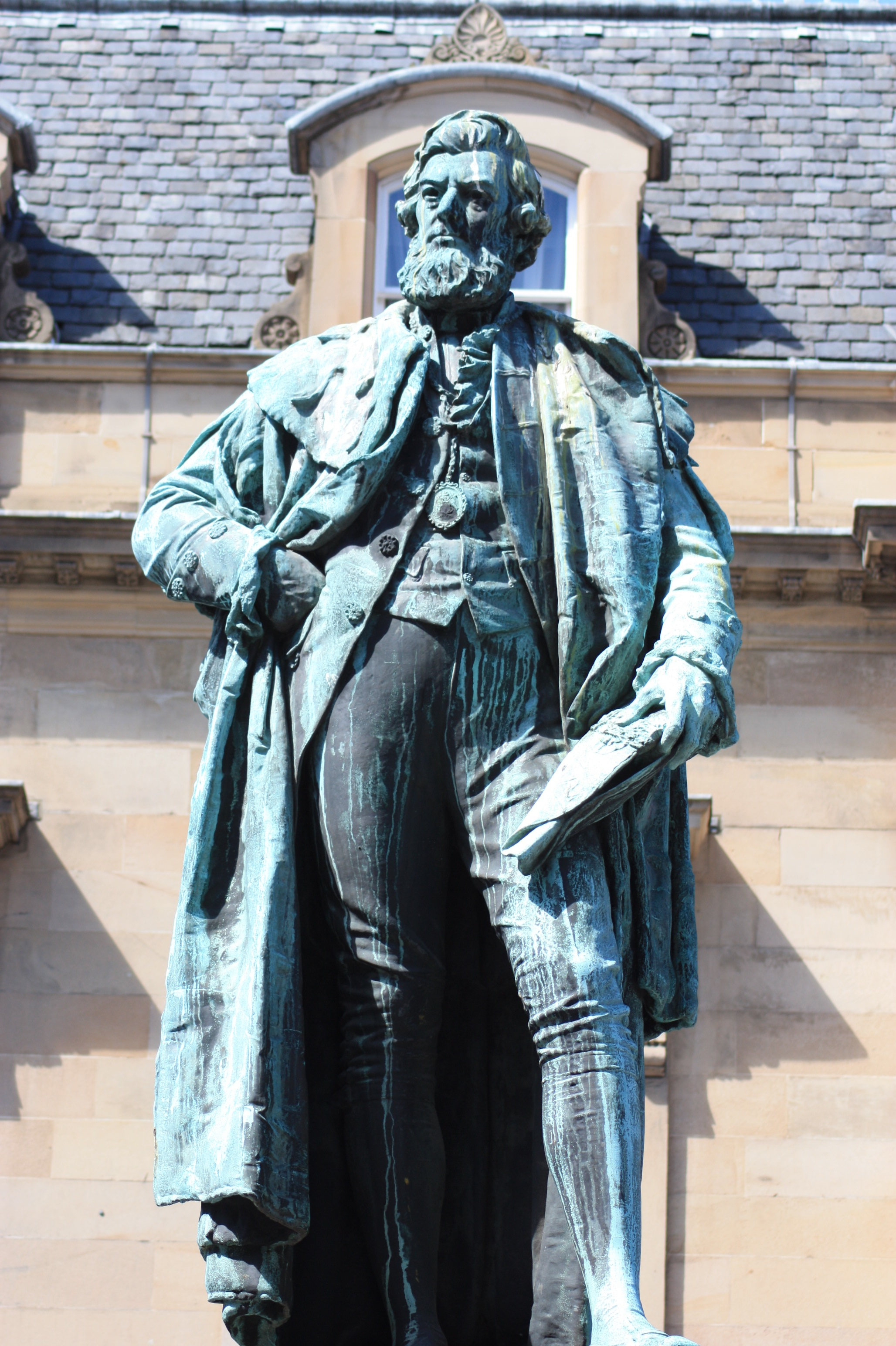
Rhind's statue of Wm Chambers on Chambers St Edinburgh
