= Edward O. Griffith =

British sculptor

Edward O. Griffith was a British sculptor, particularly known for his work in Liverpool.

From 1888 to 1892 he exhibited five times at the Walker Art Gallery, Liverpool. He carved the entire sculptural work at the New Post Office in Victoria Street and with William Birnie Rhind worked on the New Cotton Exchange in Old Hall Street. He carved all the stone in Holy Trinity Church in Southport, Lancashire.
