= Alexander Handyside Ritchie =

Scottish sculptor (1804–1870)

Alexander Handyside Ritchie (16 April 1804 – 24 April 1870) was a Scottish sculptor born in Musselburgh.

== Life ==
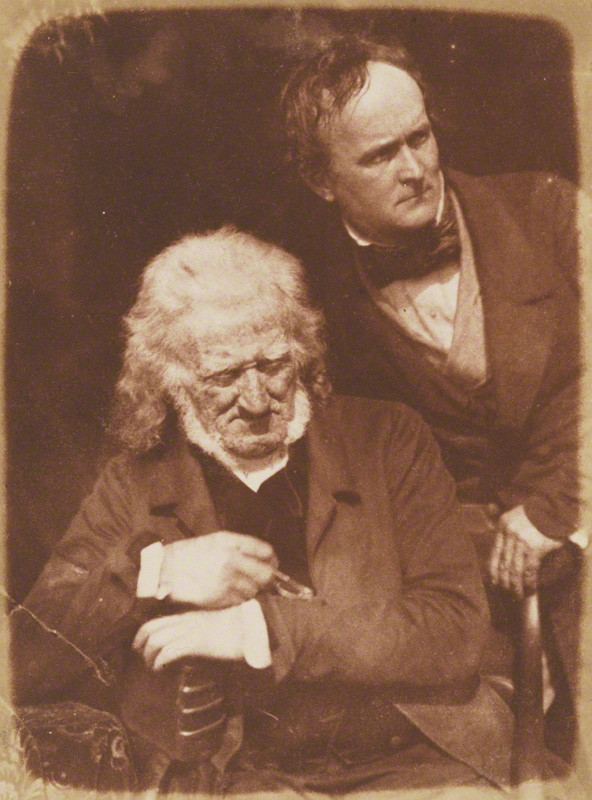
John Henning (seated) and Alexander Handyside Ritchie (standing) from the National Portrait Gallery by David Octavius Hill and Robert Adamson

Ritchie was born in Musselburgh in 1804, the son of James Ritchie, a local brickmaker and ornamental plasterer, and his wife Euphemia. The father in turn was the son of a fisherman and amateur sculptor.

After studying architecture he turned to sculpture. In 1823 he studied under Samuel Joseph at the Edinburgh School of Arts. He briefly also studied anatomy at Dr. John Barclay's Anatomy School in 1822. He studied in Rome under Bertel Thorvaldsen from 1826 to 1830, under the sponsorship of Walter, 5th Duke of Buccleuch. A favourite of Thorvaldsen he was awarded a gold medal under his tutorship. In 1830 he returned to Musselburgh where he held a studio for 12 years, then opened a sculpture studio at 92 Princes Street, Edinburgh in 1842. He had a yard at 4 East Broughton Place where most of the work was done. Ritchie trained other sculptors such as John Rhind here.

His brother John Ritchie assisted him on some works, working from the same studio. He also worked with and trained John Rhind, Alexander Munro and George Anderson Lawson.

He was elected an Associate of the Royal Scottish Academy in 1846. In 1854, he moved his studio to Mound Place in the centre of Edinburgh, living nearby at 92 Princes Street. He retired in 1861, but maintained a studio at Coates Place in Edinburgh, where he held a final exhibition in 1862. He returned to his family home at Herkes Loan, Musselburgh and spent his final years in the care of his sister Euphemia. He had no wish for riches and they lived frugally.

He died on 24 April 1870, leaving £6 10s 6d in his will. He is buried in the churchyard of St Michael in Inveresk just outside Musselburgh. He lies to the east side of the south entrance path, facing away from the path. He had no family and the grave is very humble. It is marked as being erected by his "brother sculptors WB and JR" presumed to be William Brodie and John Rhind.

It is presumed he was descended from the local farming family, the Handasydes, of whom Archibald Handasyde was a stonemason responsible for the carving of a sundial on the session house of St. Michaels in 1785.

== List of Works ==
- Bust of Sir John Hope (exhibited at RSA 1825)
- Bust of Thorwaldsen (exhibited at RSA 1830)
- Bust of Joseph Hume (1830) National Museum of Scotland
- Monument to Charles Marjoribanks at Coldstream (1836)
- Bust of the Countess of Lincoln (exhibited at the RA 1837)
- Statuary on Edinburgh's Central Public Library (1837) (with John)
- Tablet to Rev. John Patterson, Falkirk Church (1838)
- Statue of Sir Walter Scott in Selkirk (1839)
- Ronaldson memorial, East Preston Street Burial Ground, Edinburgh, (c.1840)
- Statue over entrance of 3 George IV Bridge, Edinburgh, "Caledonia and Her Children" (1840)
- Statue of Mr Ferguson of Raith at Dirlton, Haddington (1843)
- Memorial to Rev. David Dickson, at base of the west tower of St. Cuthbert's Church, Edinburgh (1844)
- Statuary group "Sophropia and Olinda at the Stake" exhibited at Westminster Hall 1844.
- Statuary on Royal College of Physicians, Queen Street, Edinburgh (1844). Corinthian aedicule bearing a figure of Hygeia flanked by statues of Hippocrates and Aesculapius.
- Figure of Charles Edward Stuart (Bonny Prince Charlie) (1844) for the inaugural opening of the Scott Monument (1846)
- Figures on the tympanum of the Commercial Bank, Glasgow (1846) including three figures of children highly praised by the "Art Union".
- Monumental figures on the head of six corinthian columns at 39 St Andrew Square, Edinburgh (built as the British Linen Bank 1846). In Baalbec fashion, representing Navigation, Commerce, Manufacture, Science, Art and Agriculture.
- Figures of Eustace de Vescy and William de Mowbray (two signators of Magna Carta for the Chamber of the House of Lords at Westminster Hall under the supervision of John Thomas. (1847)
- Pedimental sculpture on the Commercial Bank, 14 George Street, Edinburgh (later the Royal Bank of Scotland, latterly "The Dome") (1844–47). Caledonia flanked by Prudence, Agriculture, Commerce, Enterprise, Mechanical Science and Learning.
- Monument to James Reoch (d.1845) within South Leith Parish Church (1848). Portrait head flanked by Charity and Justice.
- Restoration of carvings on John Knox's House on the Royal Mile Edinburgh (1850)
- Statue of Queen Victoria for Holyrood Palace (1851)
- Monument to John Henry Alexander, actor and theatre owner, Glasgow Necropolis (1851)
- Lions for Hamilton Mausoleum (1852)
- Statue of Sir Robert Peel in Montrose (1852)
- Statue of Dr David Macbeth Moir ("Delta" Moir) on Musselburgh High St (1853)
- Monument to Colonel James Gardiner, mortally wounded at the Battle of Prestonpans, near Bankton House, Prestonpans (1853)
- Commission for a "colossal nude statue" for Peter Denny, Provost of Dumbarton resulting in a second trip to Rome to study (1854). Possibly never executed. If existing its location is unknown.
- Figures of John Knox, Andrew Melville, Alexander Henderson, James Renwick and Ebenezer Erskine plus a glass-covered monument to commemorate the Covenanters, Margaret and Agnes Wilson, all in Valley Cemetery, Stirling (1858) (known as the "Martyr's Monument")
- Statue of Hugh Miller at Cromarty (1858)
- Statue of William Wallace at Stirling (1858)
- Fishermen's Memorial at Dunbar Harbour (1861)
- Heads of "Time" "Death" and "Eternity" for Hamilton Mausoleum (1863 post-retiral)

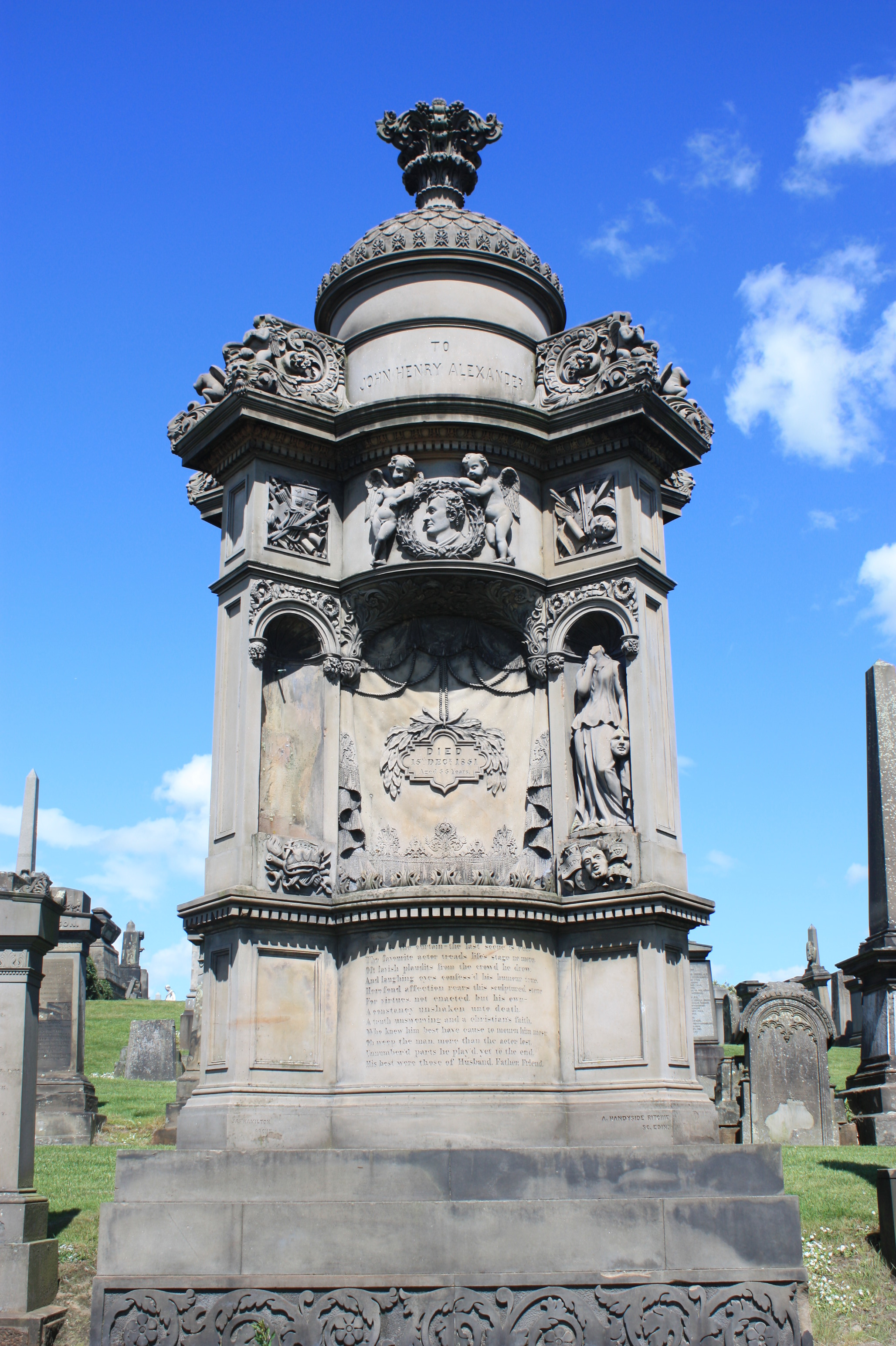
The tomb of John Henry Alexander by Handyside Ritchie, Glasgow Necropolis

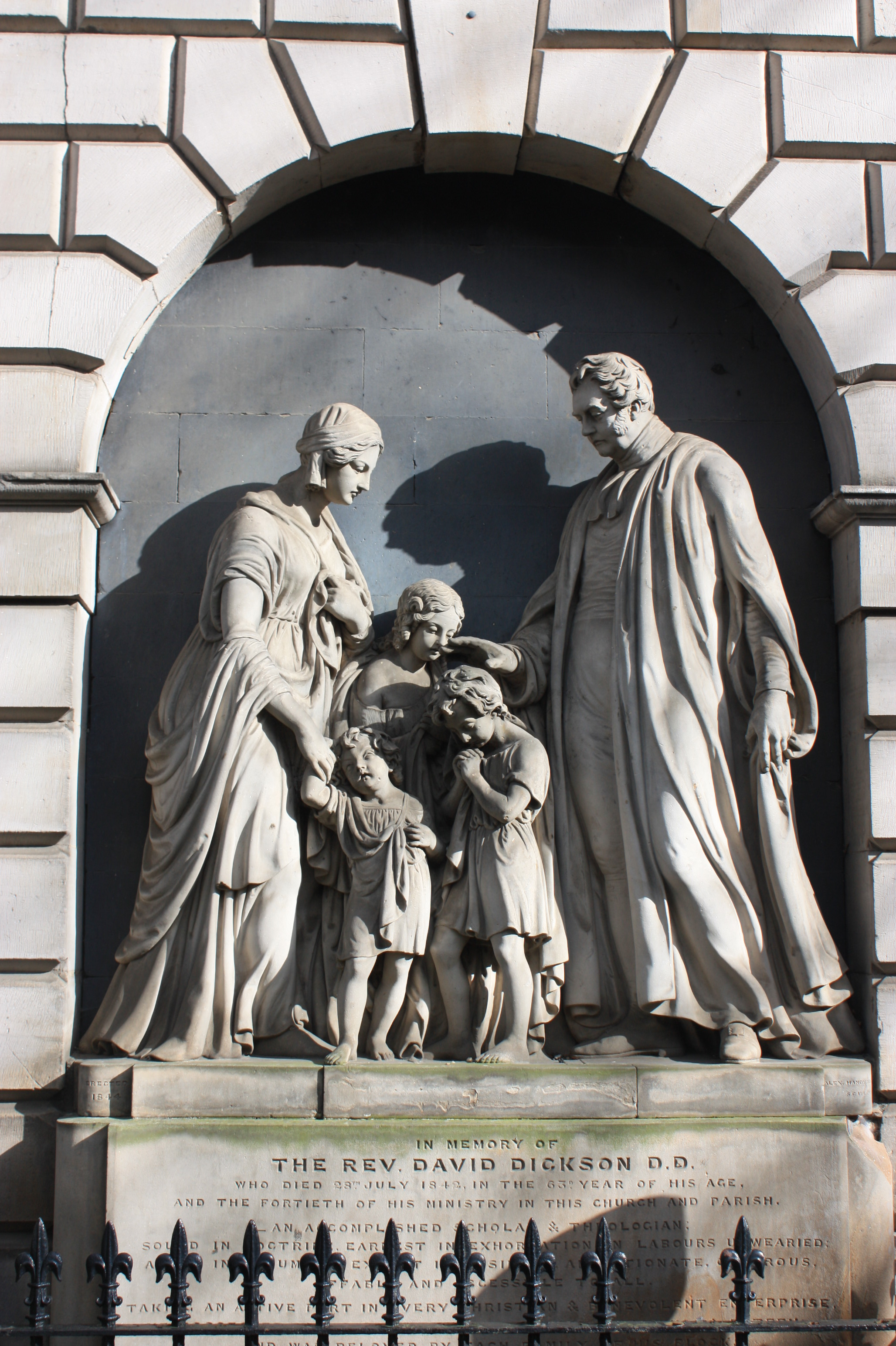
Monument to Rev Dickson, St Cuthberts Churchyard, Edinburgh by A H Ritchie

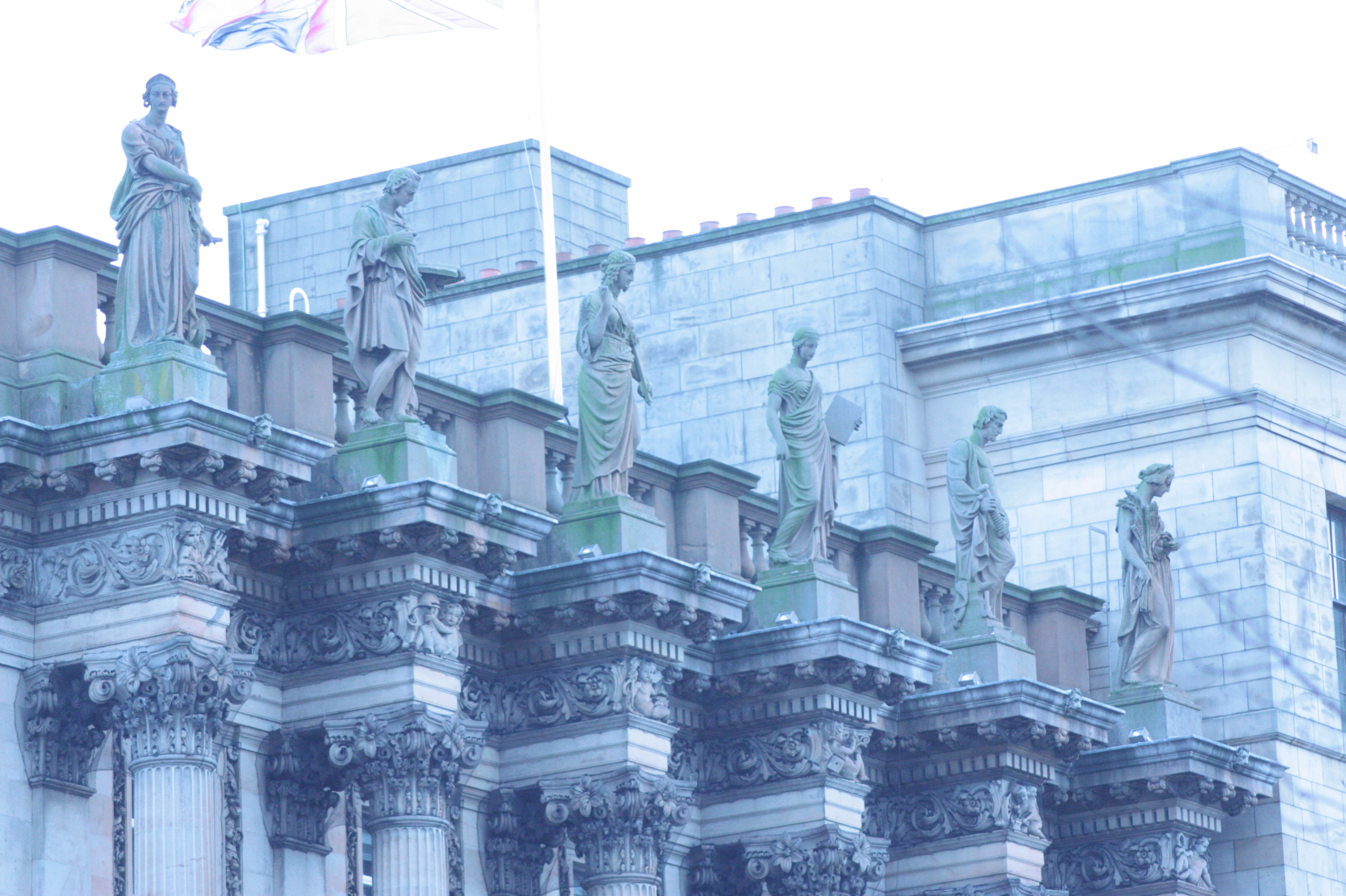
Statues by A H Ritchie, St Andrew Square, Edinburgh

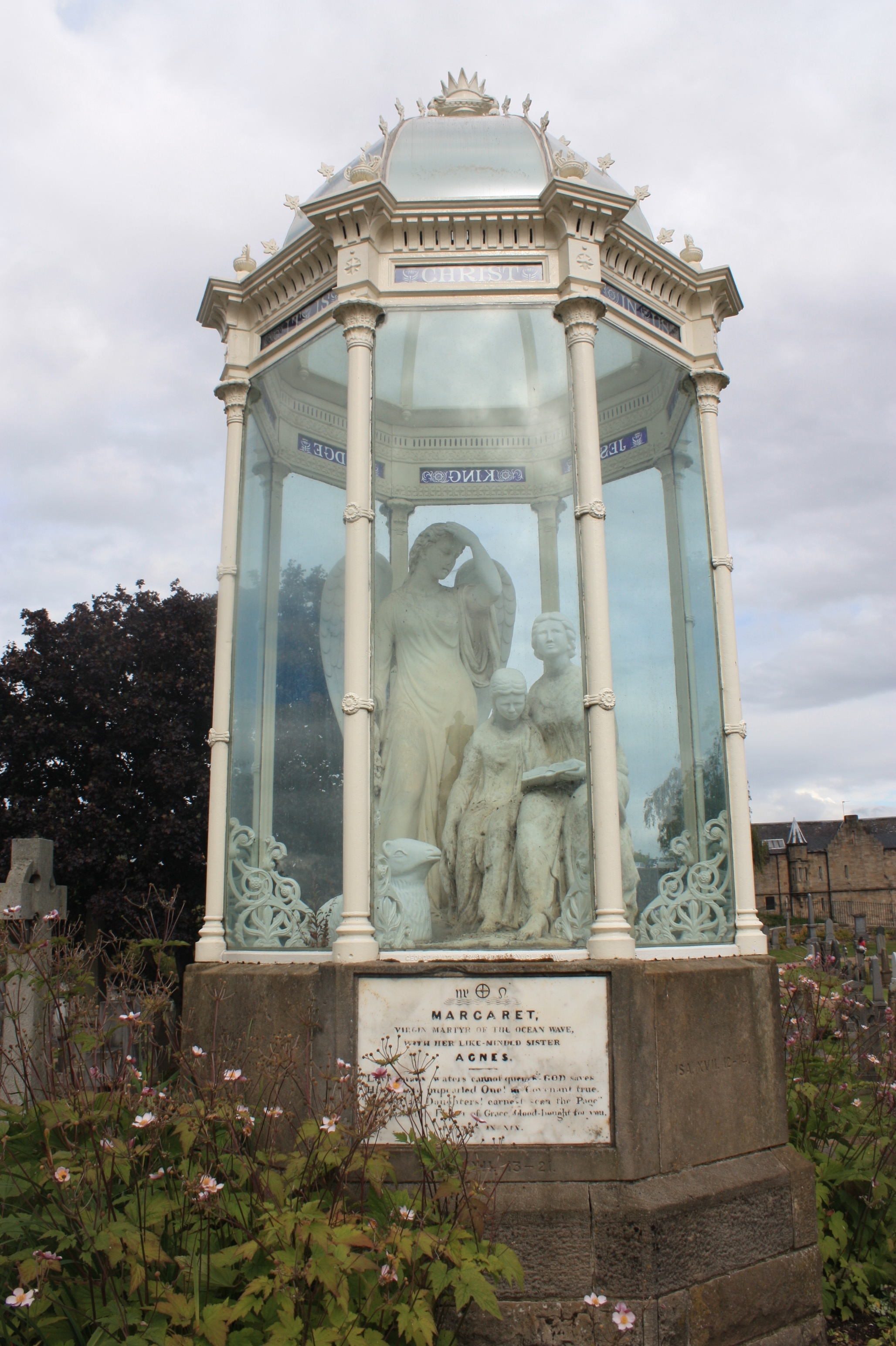
Martyr's Monument, Valley Cemetery, Stirling

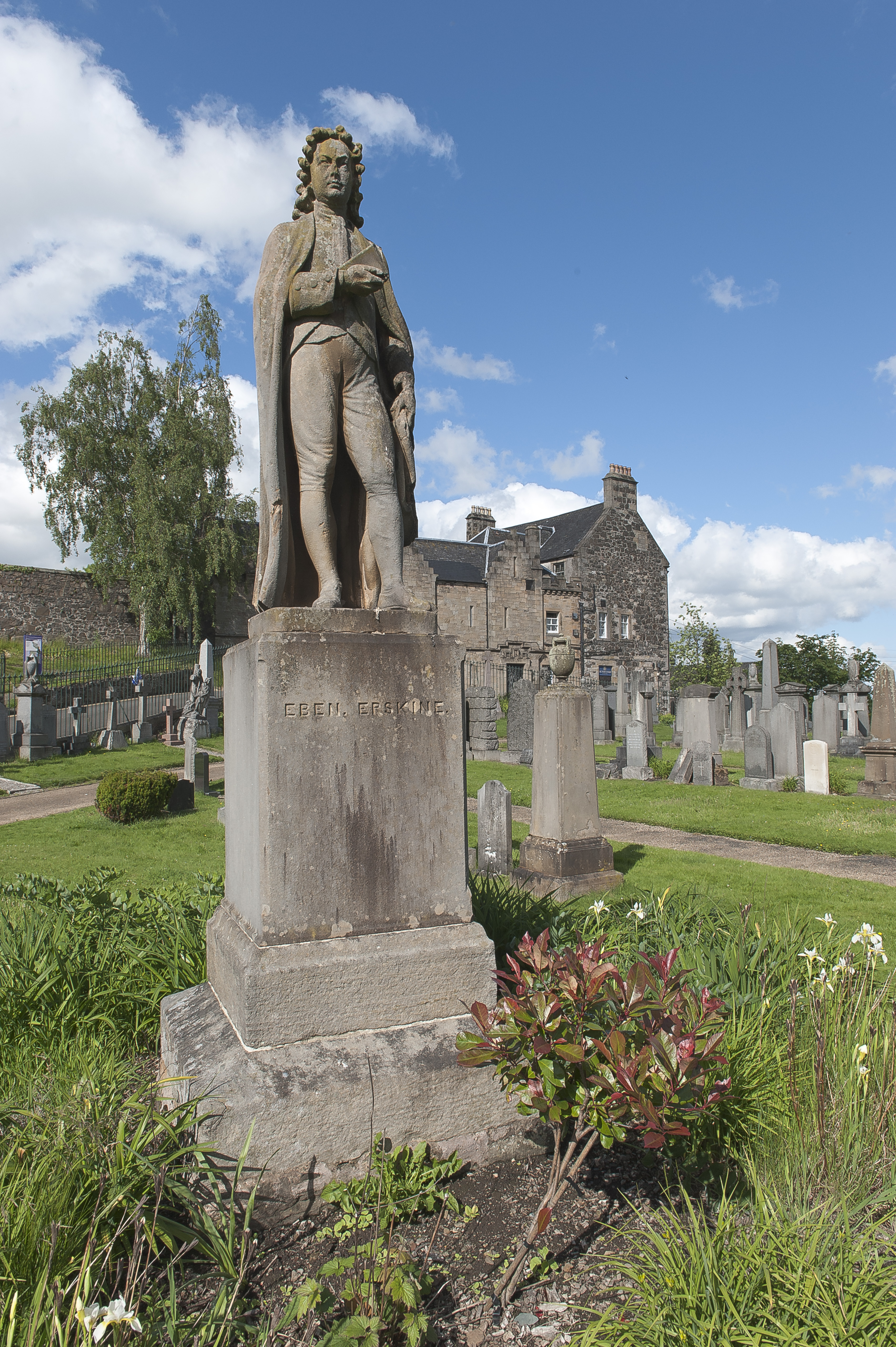
Ebenezer Erskine monument, Stirling

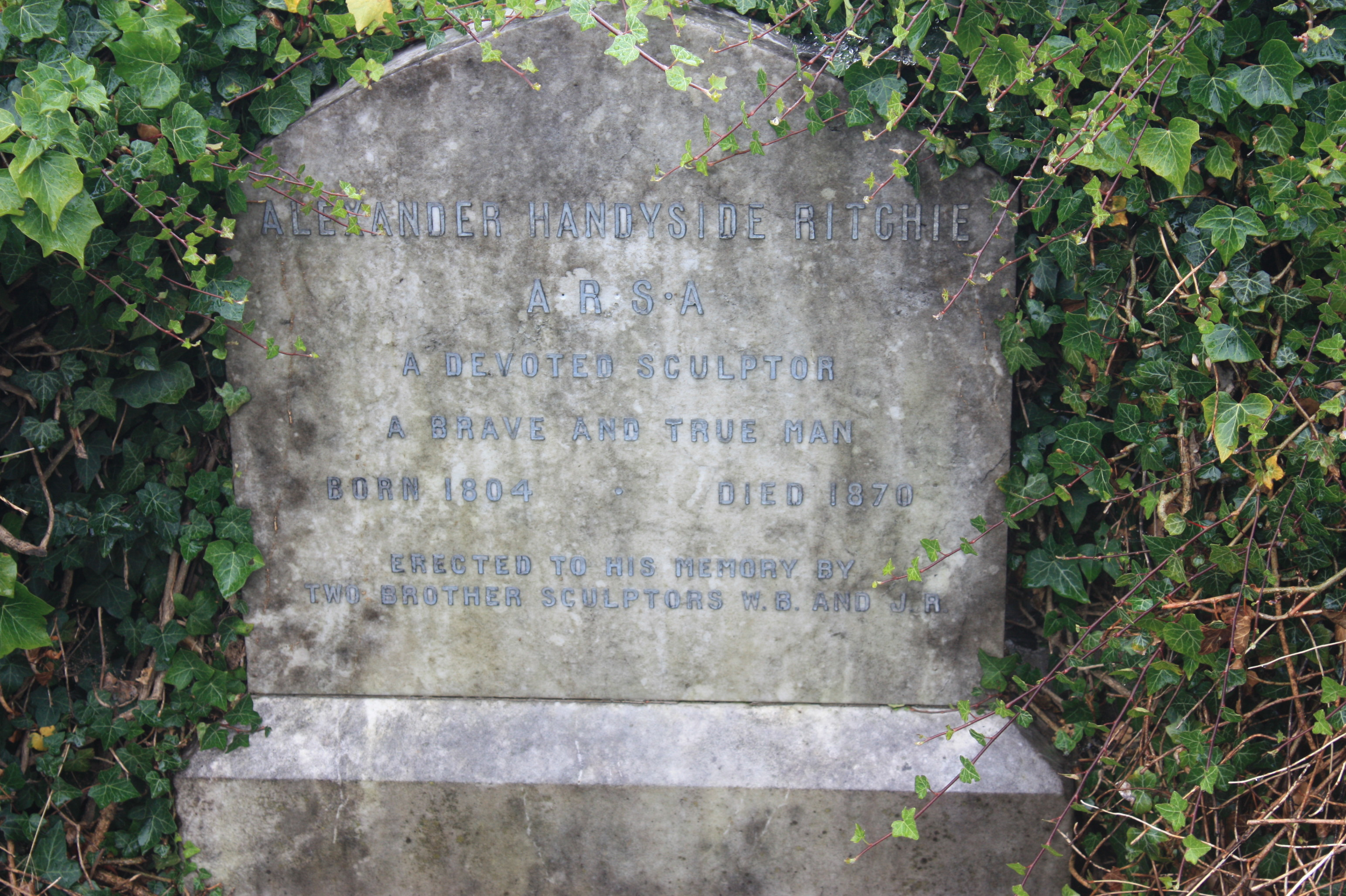
Grave of Alexander Handyside Ritchie, St Michael's, Inveresk
