= Steell =

Steell is a surname. Notable people with the name include:

- Gourlay Steell RSA (1819–1894), Scottish engraver
- Graham Steell (1851–1942), Scottish physician and cardiologist
- John Steell RSA (1804–1891), Scottish sculptor
- Willis Steell (1866–1941), American journalist, poet, dramatist, novelist and translator

== See also ==
- Graham Steell murmur, heart murmur typically associated with pulmonary regurgitation
- Steel (surname)
