= Alexander Thoms =

Scottish mineralogist

Alexander Thoms FRSE (1837–1925) was a 19th/20th century Scottish mineralogist. His collection of rocks and minerals form a core part of the collection within the Hunterian Museum and Art Gallery in Glasgow.

== Life ==
He was born in Longforgan, Perthshire, on 9 November 1837, the son of John Thoms of Clepington, and his wife, Barbara Wise.

Around 1854 he went to Bengal in India and spent around three decades there managing tea plantations. He returned permanently to Scotland in 1884 and settled in St Andrews where he already had family links. He was a church elder in St Leonard's Church and served as Kirk Treasurer from 1889 to 1921.

In 1905, he was elected a Fellow of the Royal Society of Edinburgh. His proposers were Ben Peach, John Horne, Robert Kidston and James Currie.

He died on Boxing Day, 26 December 1925, at his home on Playfair Terrace in St Andrews.

== Publications ==
- The Mineralogy of Scotland

== Family ==
He married three times. Firstly in 1879 to Mary Watson Wemyss (born 1849), daughter of Dr Alexander Watson Wemyss of St Andrews. Mary died in March of the following year a few days after giving birth to their only child (who also died).

He then (around 1885) married Jean Fowler Munro (born 1855) of Ratho. They had a son Alexander Thoms (born 1886).

In April 1898, he married Clementina Christian Sinclair Heddle (1860–1942), daughter of Prof Matthew Forster Heddle of St Andrews University. Clementina emigrated to California in 1939.
