= James Warburton Begbie =

Scottish physician

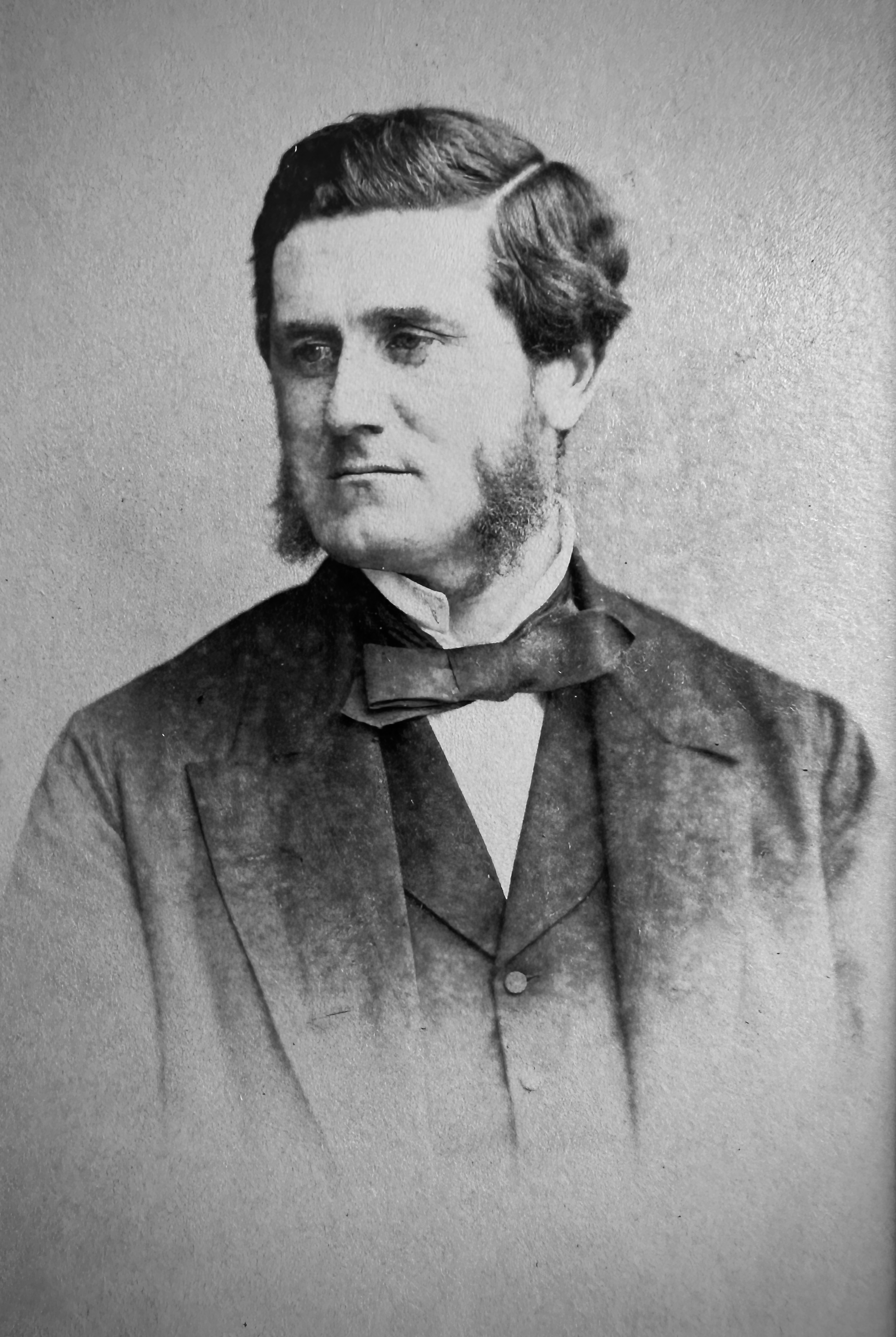

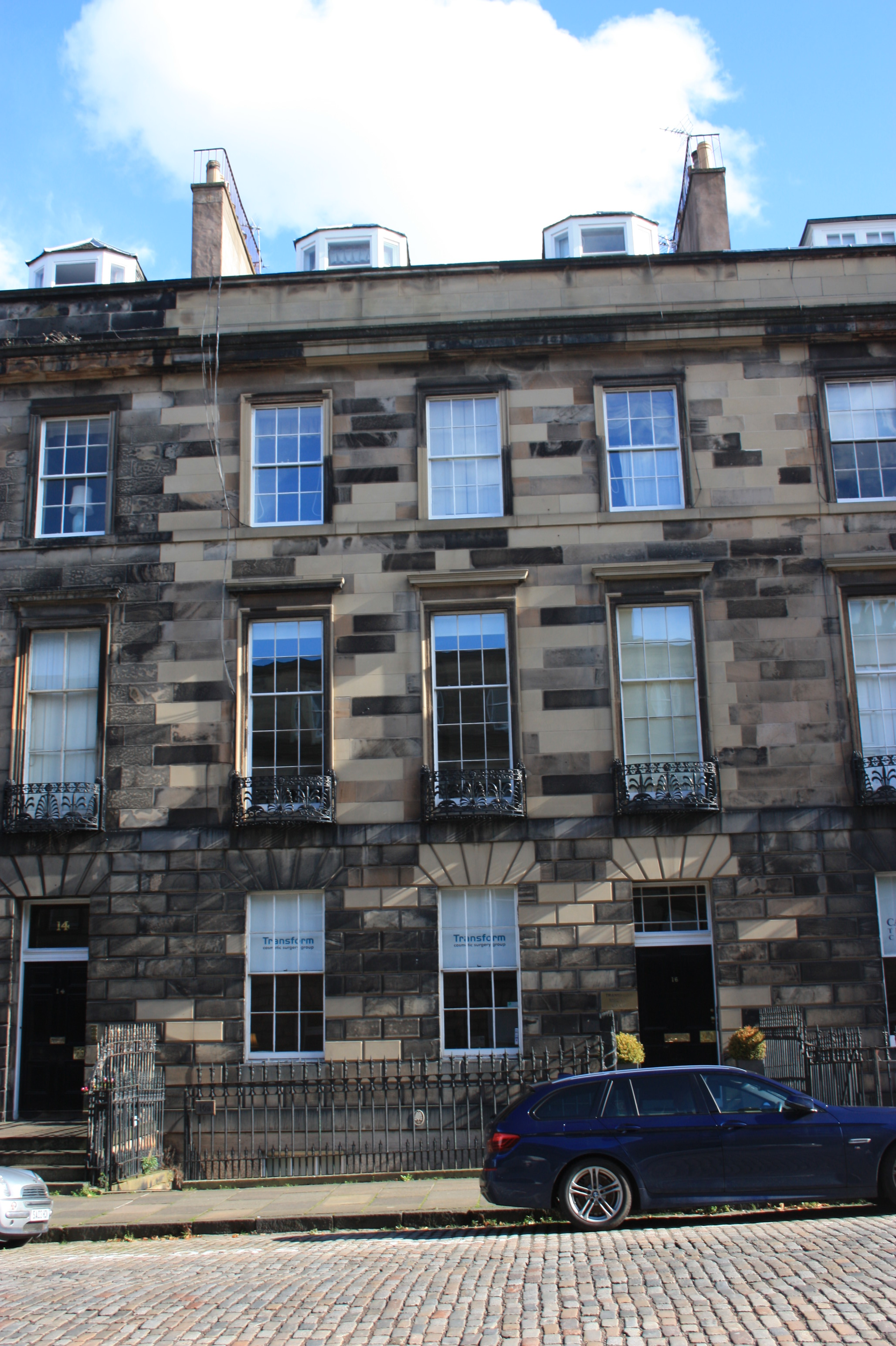
16 Great Stuart Street, Edinburgh

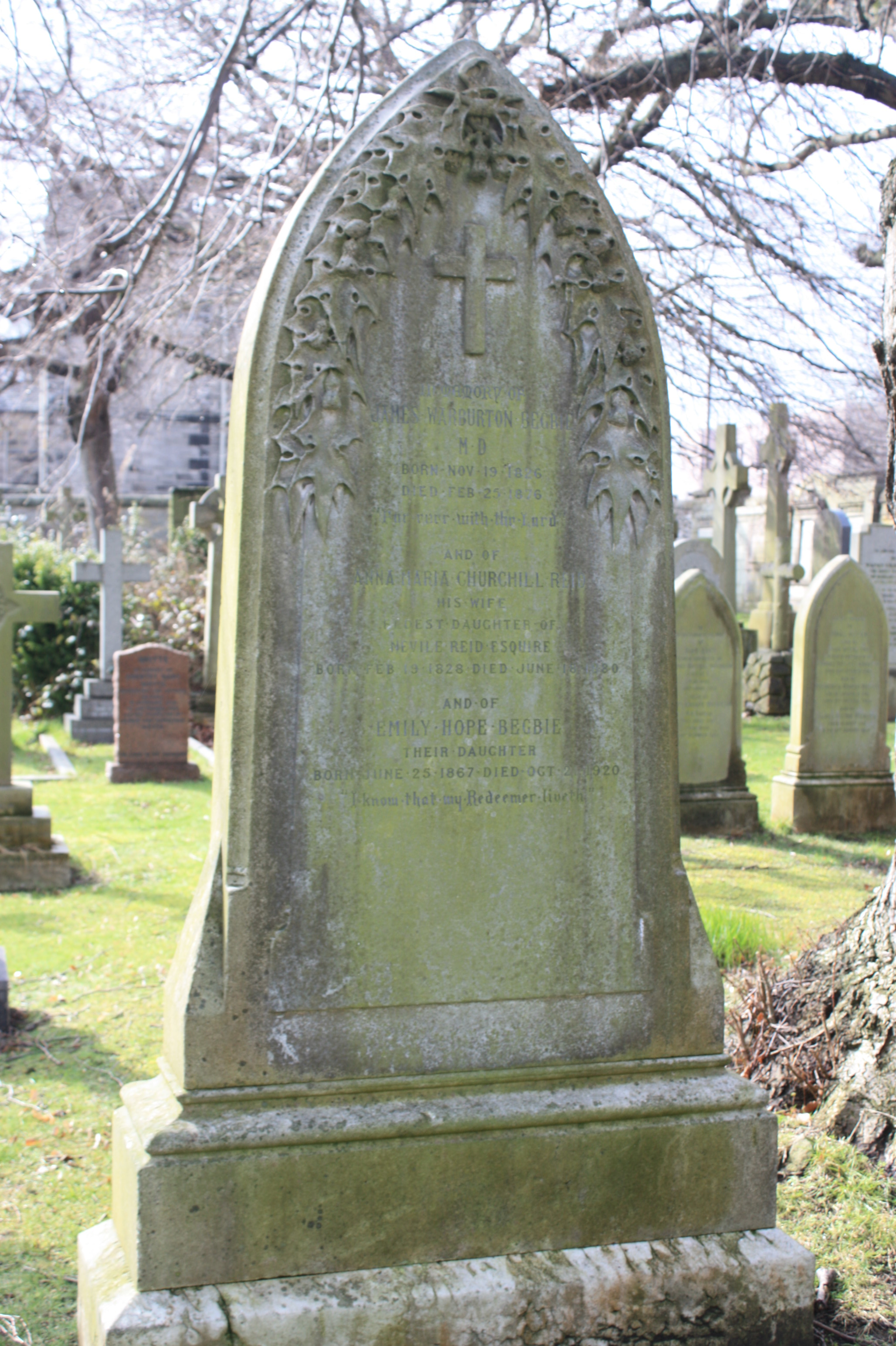
The grave of James Warburton Begbie, Dean Cemetery

James Warburton Begbie (19 November 1826 – 25 February 1876), was a Scottish physician.

== Biography ==
He was born on 19 November 1826, and was the second son of Dr James Begbie, The family lived at 18 Albany Street in Edinburgh's Second New Town.

He was educated at the Edinburgh Academy, and in 1843 became a medical student in the University of Edinburgh. Of his teachers there, William Pulteney Alison appears to have influenced him most. In 1847 he proceeded M.D. with a dissertation 'On some of the Pathological Conditions of the Urine,' which received special commendation. He afterwards studied in Paris, paying special attention to diseases of the skin, under Cazenave and Devergie. About 1852 he settled in Edinburgh as a family practitioner, and was made fellow of the Royal College of Physicians there. In 1852 he married Miss Anna Maria Reid, by whom he had three sons and four daughters. Begbie was appointed Physician In-Ordinary (Scotland) to Queen Victoria's Medical Household in 1853. In 1854 he was appointed physician to the (temporary) cholera hospital in Edinburgh, and in 1855 physician to the Royal Infirmary, a post which he held for the statutory period of ten years. During the same time he gave clinical lectures in the Infirmary, and lectured on the practice of physic at the Edinburgh Extramural School of Medicine, where he gave also a short annual course of lectures on the history of medicine. In 1857 he was elected a member of the Harveian Society of Edinburgh.

After 1863 Begbie ceased to teach or hold hospital appointments, though busily occupied in his profession; and in 1869, on the death of his father, he limited himself to consulting practice. In 1870 he was elected a member of the Aesculapian Club. For the remainder of his life he was the most popular and highly esteemed physician in Scotland. The incessant calls made upon him for consultations in the country, involving wearying railway journeys, taxed his strength very severely, and doubtless contributed to the breakdown of his health. In 1875, at the meeting of the British Medical Association in Edinburgh, he was entrusted with the delivery of the address on medicine, and at the same time his own university paid him the compliment of conferring upon him the honorary degree of LL.D. Immediately after this event he was compelled to give up work through an affection of the heart, which closed his life on 25 February 1876. Begbie was well fitted, physically, morally, and intellectually, for the work of his profession, and was, in the highest sense of the word, remarkably successful, not only in relieving the bodily ills of his patients, but in winning their confidence and affection. These qualities gained him deservedly a very high reputation in Scotland.

His writings are characteristic of an able but extremely busy man. They are chiefly accounts of cases with copious comments discussing in almost every instance the views and discoveries of others, without any important original contribution of his own. At the same time these memoirs are very thoroughly done, containing numerous literary references, and not wanting in useful practical hints. Begbie's only separate book was 'A Handy Book of Medical Information and Advice, by a Physician,' published anonymously in 1860, of which a second edition appeared in 1872. He wrote thirteen articles in Reynolds's 'System of Medicine,' of which perhaps the most important were on 'Local Paralysis from Nerve Disease,' 'Dysentery,' 'Fatty Liver,' 'Cancer of the Liver,' &c. The best of his other papers, published in various medical journals, were reprinted by the New Sydenham Society as 'Selections from the Works of the late J. Warburton Begbie, edited [with a memoir] by Dr. Dyce Duckworth,' London, 1882.

Begbie Road, Greenwich, London, SE3, is named in his honour.

In his later life Begbie lived at 16 Great Stuart Street on the Moray Estate in Edinburgh's fashionable West End.

Begbie is buried in Dean Cemetery in western Edinburgh. The grave lies in the north-west section of the first northern extension, north of the westmost roundel. His wife, Anna Maria Churchill lies with him.

== Family ==
His eldest son was James Warburton Begbie Jr.

Begbie's daughter Florence Annie Begbie (d.1949) was mother of Alan Lennox-Boyd, 1st Viscount Boyd of Merton (1904-1983).

Begbie's living descendants as of 2017 include James Edward Begbie and Rev. James Luke Begbie. His grandson, James Lorne Begbie, died 11 March 2016.

== Artistic recognition ==
A bust of Begbie by Sir John Steell is held at the Royal College of Physicians of Edinburgh.
