= James Begbie =

Scottish medical doctor (1798–1869)

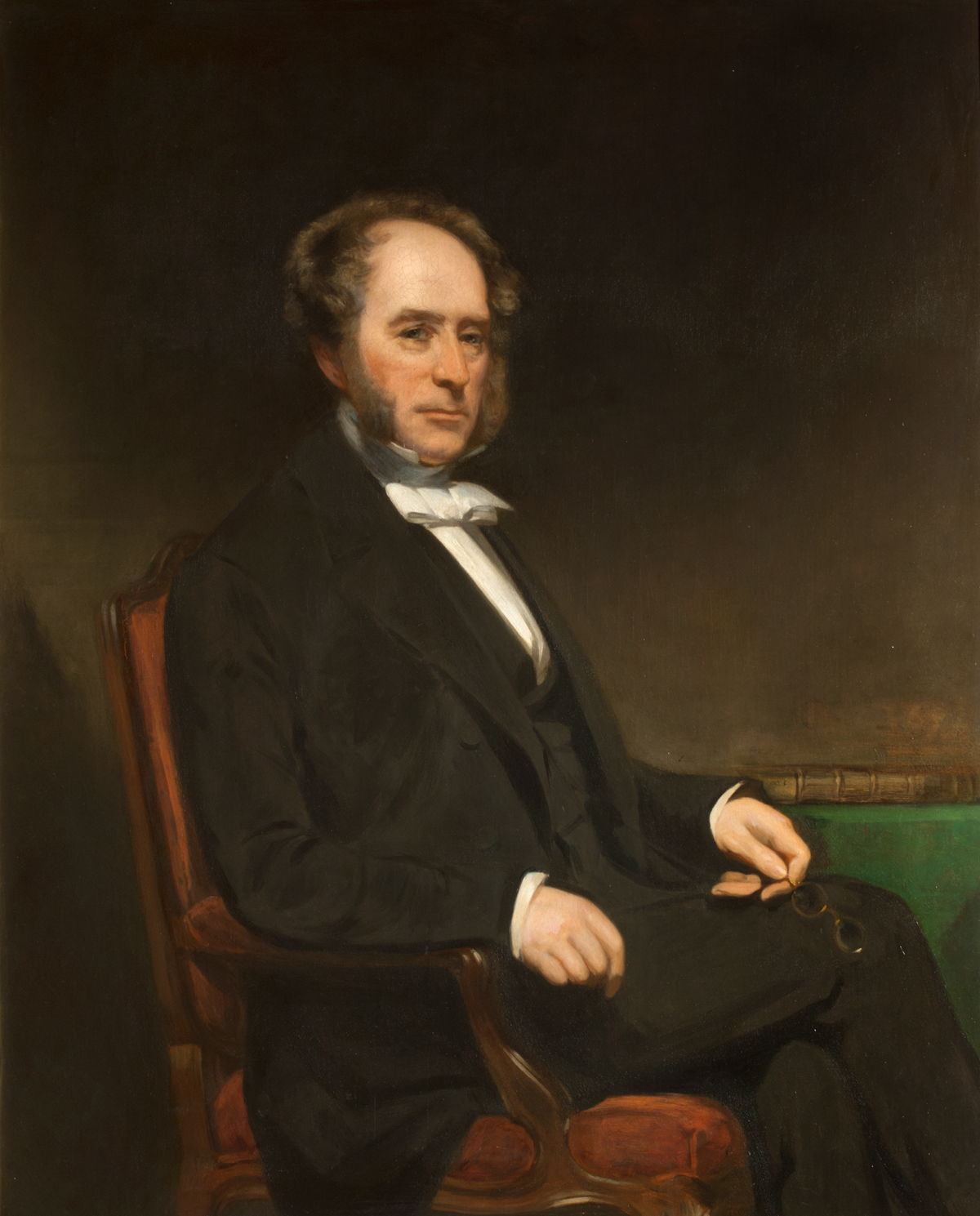
Portrait of James Begbie

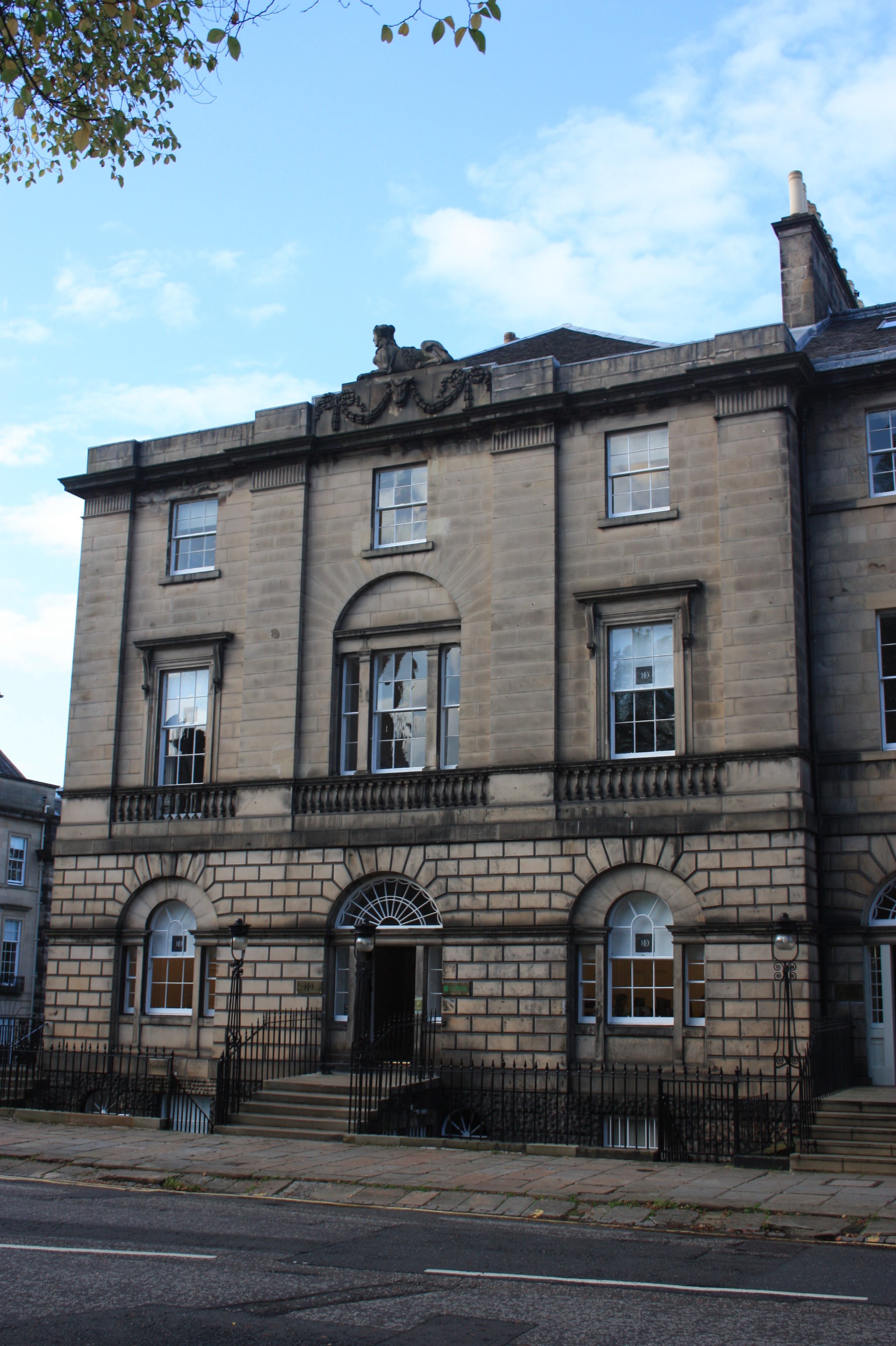
10 Charlotte Square, Edinburgh

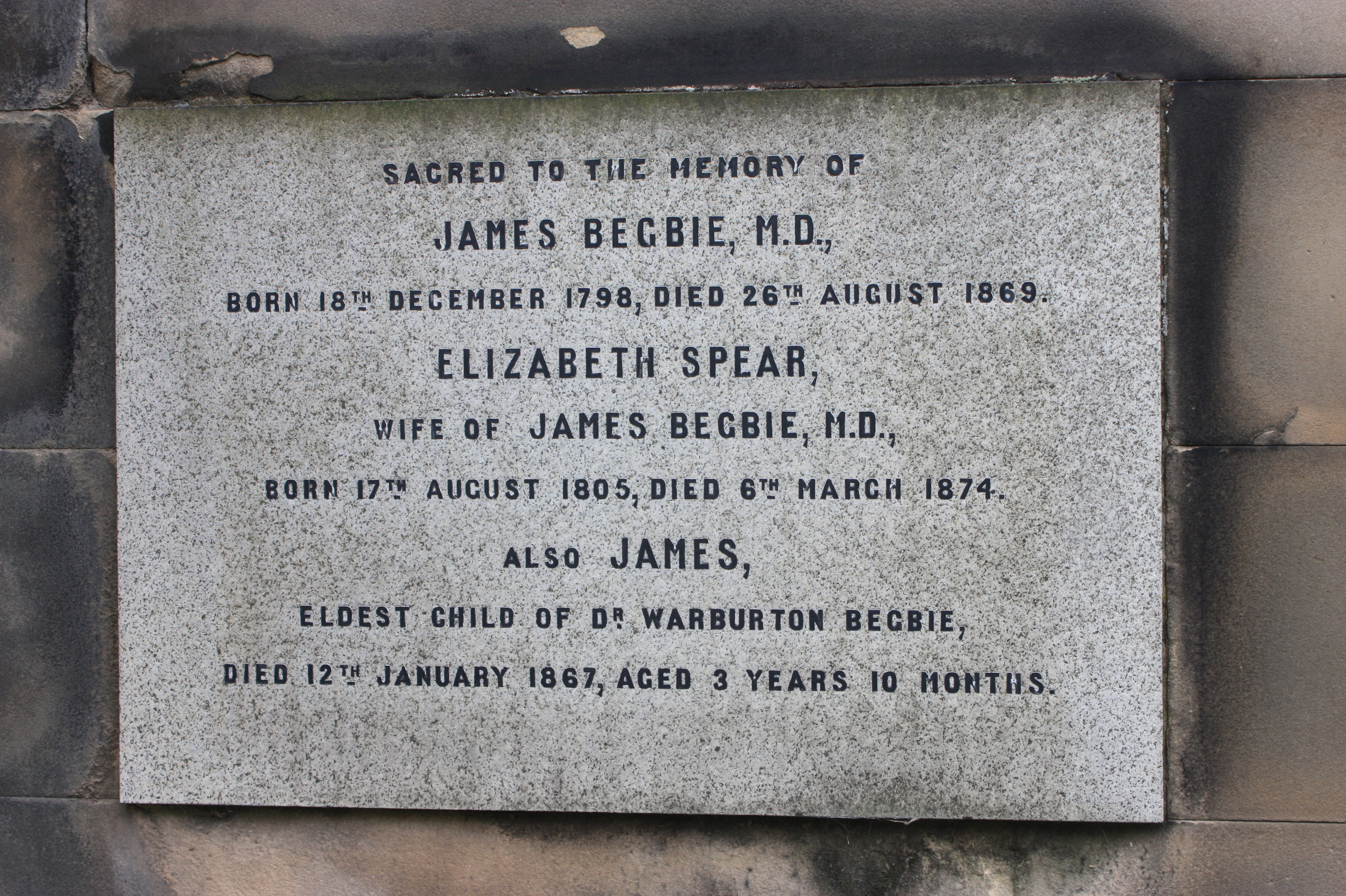
The grave of Dr James Begbie, New Calton Cemetery, Edinburgh

James Begbie FRSE FRCPE FRCSE (1798, Edinburgh – 26 August 1869, Edinburgh) was a Scottish medical doctor who served as president of the Medico-Chirurgical Society of Edinburgh (1850–2) and as president of the Royal College of Physicians of Edinburgh (1854–6).

He was among the first physicians to give a detailed description of exophthalmic goitre, currently known as Graves disease (previously called Basedow's syndrome or Begbie's disease). He is also related to the study of Dubini's disease, the old name for myoclonic epidemic encephalitis.

His son James Warburton Begbie was also an eminent physician.

== Biography ==
Begbie was born on 18 December 1798 in Edinburgh, and educated at the High School. Aged 14 he was apprenticed to Dr John Abercrombie (1780–1844) at 19 York Place. Later on, he also became Abercrombie's assistant.

In 1821, Begbie obtained his medical doctorate (MD) from the University of Edinburgh. In 1822, he became a fellow of the Royal College of Surgeons. In 1827 he is listed as a Governor of the Dean Orphan Hospital At this stage he lived at 30 Abercromby Place. In 1827 he was elected a member of the Harveian Society of Edinburgh.

He was elected a Fellow of the Royal Society of Edinburgh his proposer was David Maclagan.

In 1847, he also became a fellow of the Royal College of Physicians, and became its president from 1854 up to 1856. For forty years, Begbie was a physician for the Scottish Widows Fund and Life Assurance Society 1837 to 1869. In 1848 he was elected a member of the Aesculapian Club.

In 1850 he lived at 3 Charlotte Square.

Begbie's final years were spent living at 10 Charlotte Square one of Edinburgh's most prestigious addresses. His neighbour was James Syme.

For several years he was Physician in Ordinary to Queen Victoria in Scotland.

Begbie died in Edinburgh and was interred at the New Calton Cemetery. The grave is in a concealed location on the north face of the north-most vault against the east wall.

== Works ==
Begbie wrote about important statistical data, the use of arsenic for chronic rheumatism, the use of nitric-hydrochloric acid for oxaluria, and the use of potassium bromide for nervousness.

== Publications ==
Contributions to Practical Medicine (1862).

== Family ==
He was married to Elizabeth Spear (1805–1874).

Begbie's son was Dr James Warburton Begbie FRSE (1826–1876).
