= James Currie (shipowner) =

Scottish businessman (1863–1930)

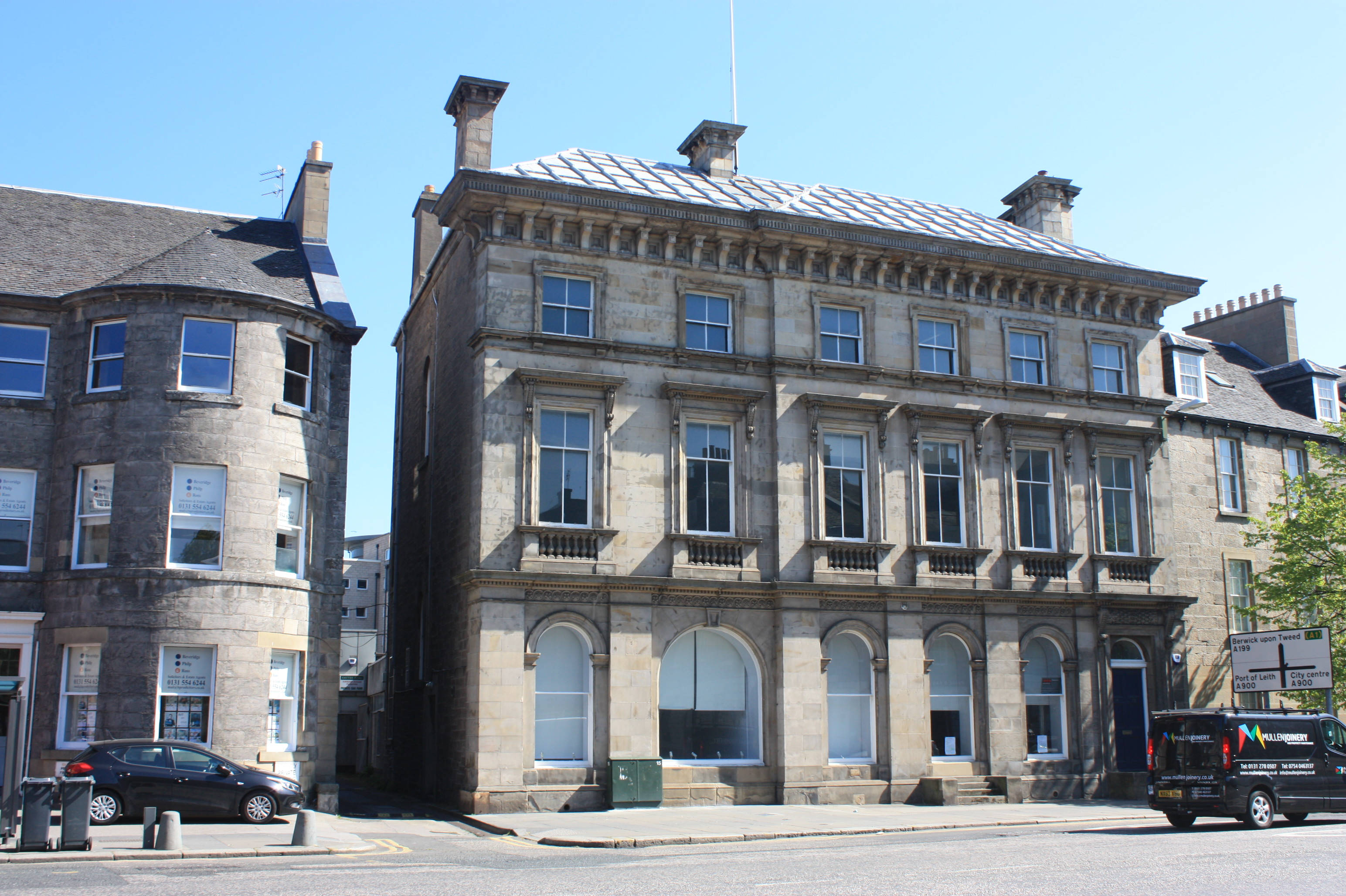
The former Currie Line offices on Bernard Street, Leith

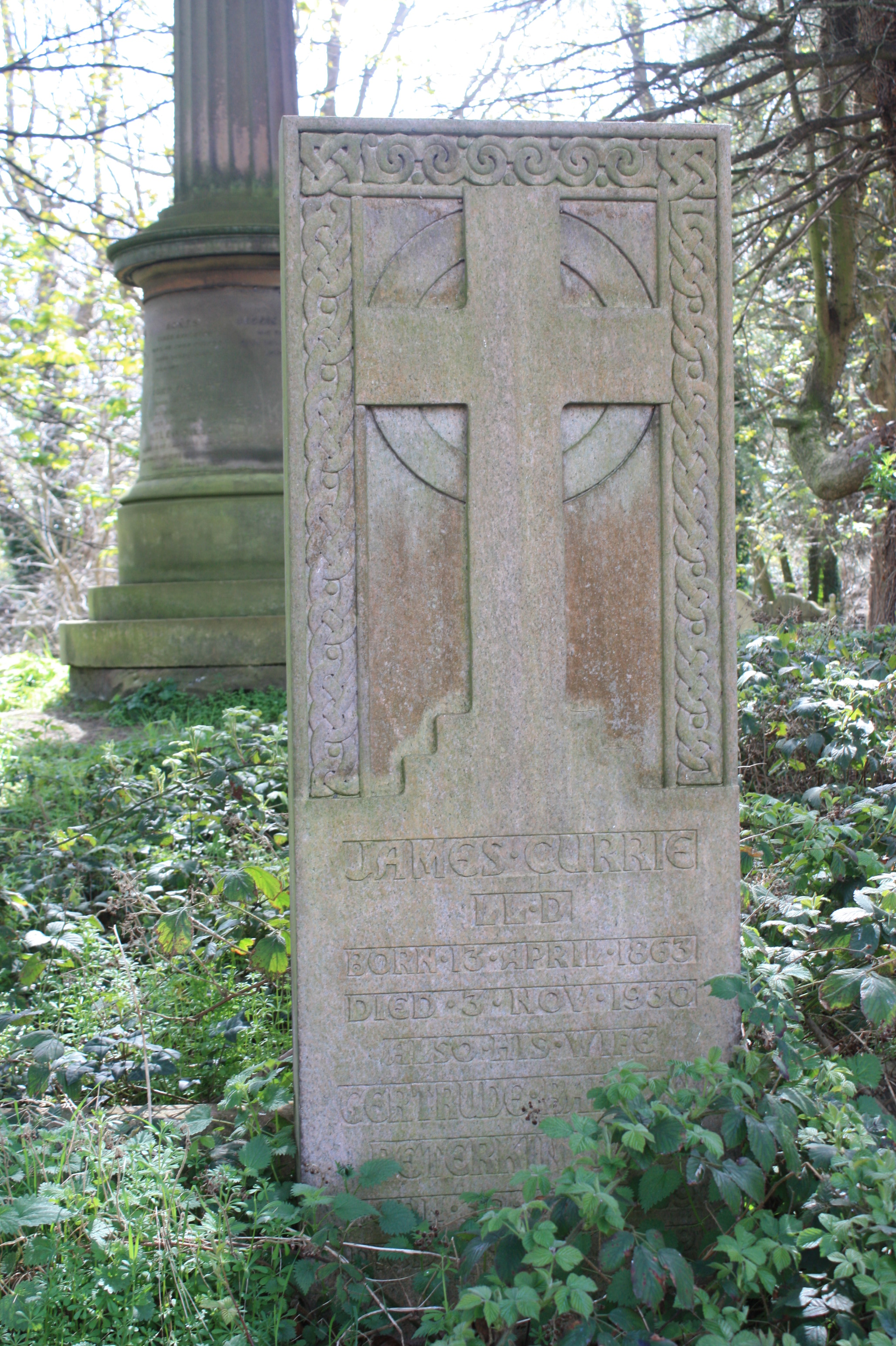
The grave of James Currie, Warriston Cemetery

James Currie (13 April 1863 – 3 November 1930) was a Scottish businessman who was the owner and senior partner of the international shipping company, the Currie Line. He was also a keen amateur botanist, mineralogist and archaeologist, making sufficient impact on the Scottish world of science as to rise to be President of the Royal Society of Edinburgh.

== Life ==
Currie was born at Catherine Bank House on Newhaven Road (demolished c.1900) in Leith, Scotland on 13 April 1863. He was the son of Jessie Campbell Maxwell and James Currie (1823–1900), shipowner and shipbuilder, brother of the Glasgow shipbuilder, Donald Currie. His father had come to Leith to run the Leith Hull and Hamburg Steam Packet Company but had branched out to create his own shipping companies. The company offices, both for James Currie and Co and the Currie Line, were at 34 Bernard Street in the heart of Leith.

He was educated at Edinburgh Academy 1876-79 and then attended both the University of Edinburgh and the University of Cambridge, graduating with an MA.

A keen scientist, his interests were easily funded by his family's wealth. His business interests were second to his scientific pursuits until 1900 when his father died and he had to take his place as owner and director of both James Currie & Co (the shipbuilding branch) and the Currie Line (the shipping company), by this time owning ships and property both in Leith and London. He also inherited around £100,000 at this point.

In 1897 he was elected a Fellow of the Royal Society of Edinburgh his proposers being Sir William Thomson, Lord Kelvin, Matthew Forster Heddle, D’Arcy Wentworth Thompson, and John Young Buchanan. He served as Treasurer to the Society from 1906 to 1926 and President 1926–29. The University of Edinburgh awarded him an honorary doctorate (LLD) in 1919. He was also President of the Edinburgh Geological Society 1904–6.

On 3 November 1930 he died at Trinity Cottage, a large villa at the junction of Ferry Road and South Trinity Road in north Edinburgh. The villa was demolished in the 1960s to build the Scottish Tax Offices (also in turn demolished).

On his death the company passed to his youngest and only surviving brother, Alastair Currie (1867–1942).

He is buried with his wife in Warriston Cemetery near the centre of the main roundel (south of the vaults).

== Family ==
He was married to Gertrude Barclay Peterkin MBE (1859–1939) around 1890.

They had three daughters, Margaret, Elizabeth and Isobel, and one son James .
