= Donald Esme Innes =

Scottish geologist

Donald Esme Innes FRSE MC was a 20th century Scottish geologist.

== Life ==
Born Donald Esme Isaacs on 22 November 1888 to Donald Isaacs and Anne Isaacs (formerly Stewart) in Clifton, Bristol. He was bought up by Annie and Catherine Isaacson in Oxford from a very early age. He went to Repton and studied Sciences at Oxford University and graduated in 1911 with 1st class honours, specialising in Geology. He was awarded the Burden Coutts scholarship for post-graduate work and he later became Professor of Geology at St Andrews University.

He won the Military Cross in the First World War.

He gained his hockey blue while a student at Oxford and played for St Andrews university from 1920 to 1924. He played for Scotland from 1922 to 1924 and captained the side in 1923 and 1924.

In June 1924 he changed his name by Deed poll to Donald Esme Innes. At this time he was living at 23 Lathbury Road in Oxford.

In 1925 he married Lilian Grace Isaacson, and they had one son, Donald John, born in 1932.

In 1936 he was elected a Fellow of the Royal Society of Edinburgh. His proposers were Thomas James Jehu, Sir D’Arcy Wentworth Thompson, Robert Campbell and Robert Meldrum Craig. . He resigned from the Society in 1953.

He died on 28 May 1961.

== Publications ==
- The Mineralogy of Scotland (1923) co-written with Matthew Forster Heddle
