= William Fettes Douglas =

Scottish painter (1822–1891)

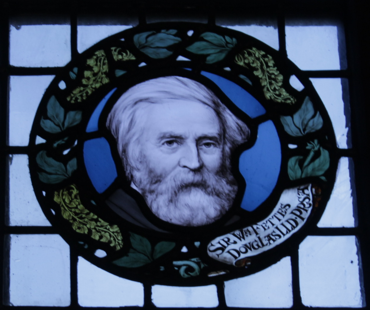
Stained glass to William Fettes Douglas in Scottish National Portrait Gallery

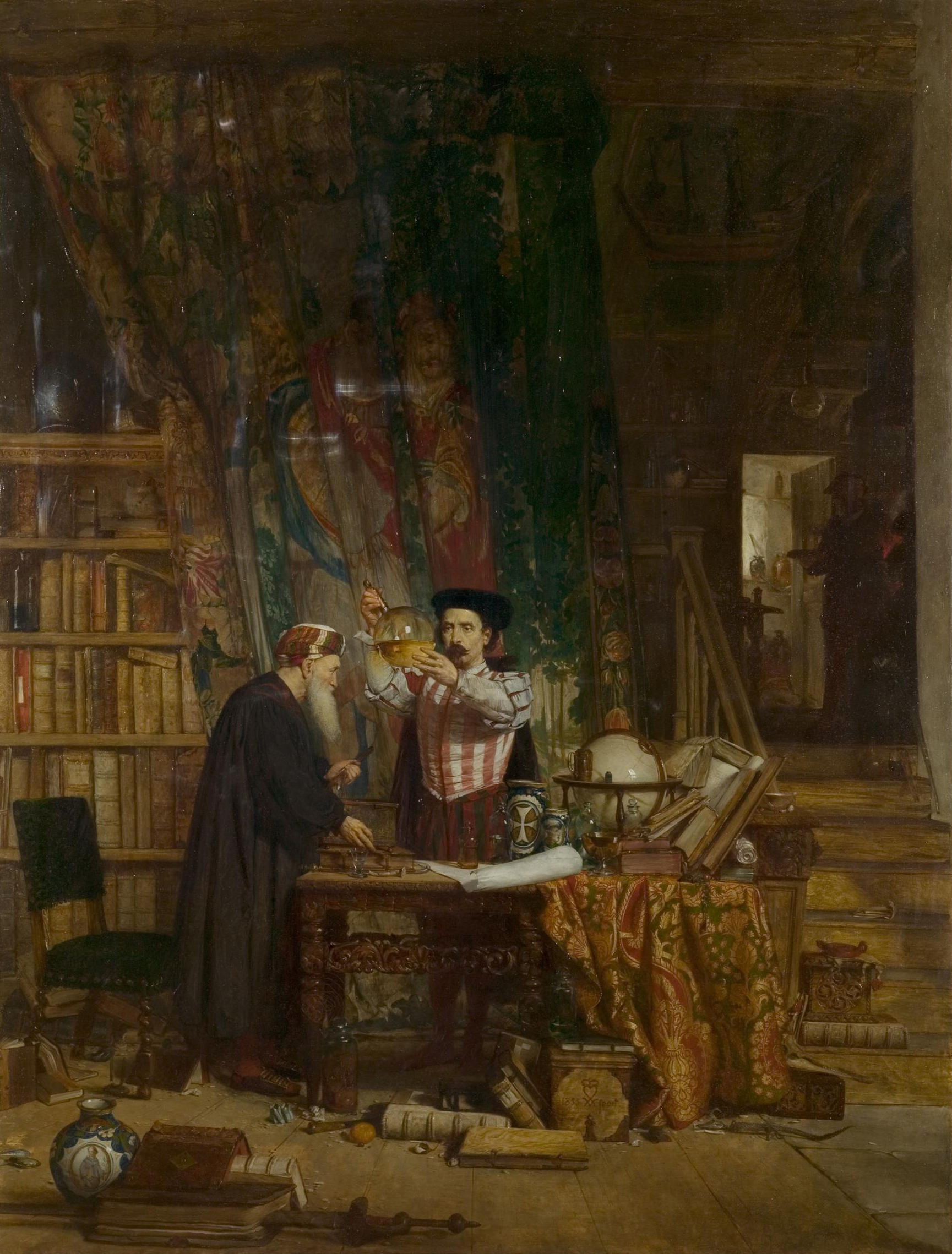
The Alchemist by William Fettes Douglas, 1855

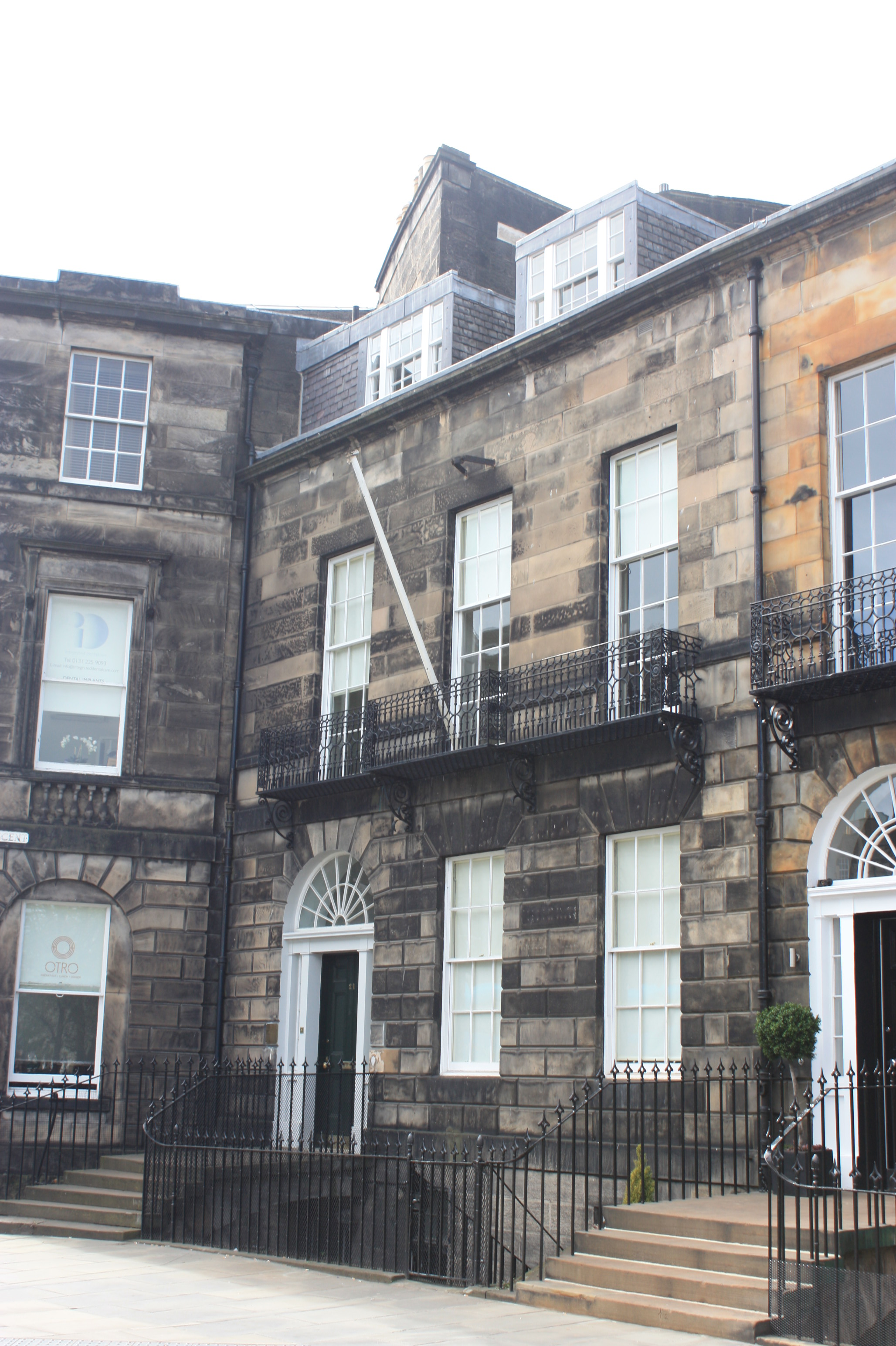
Douglas's house at 21 Coates Crescent, Edinburgh

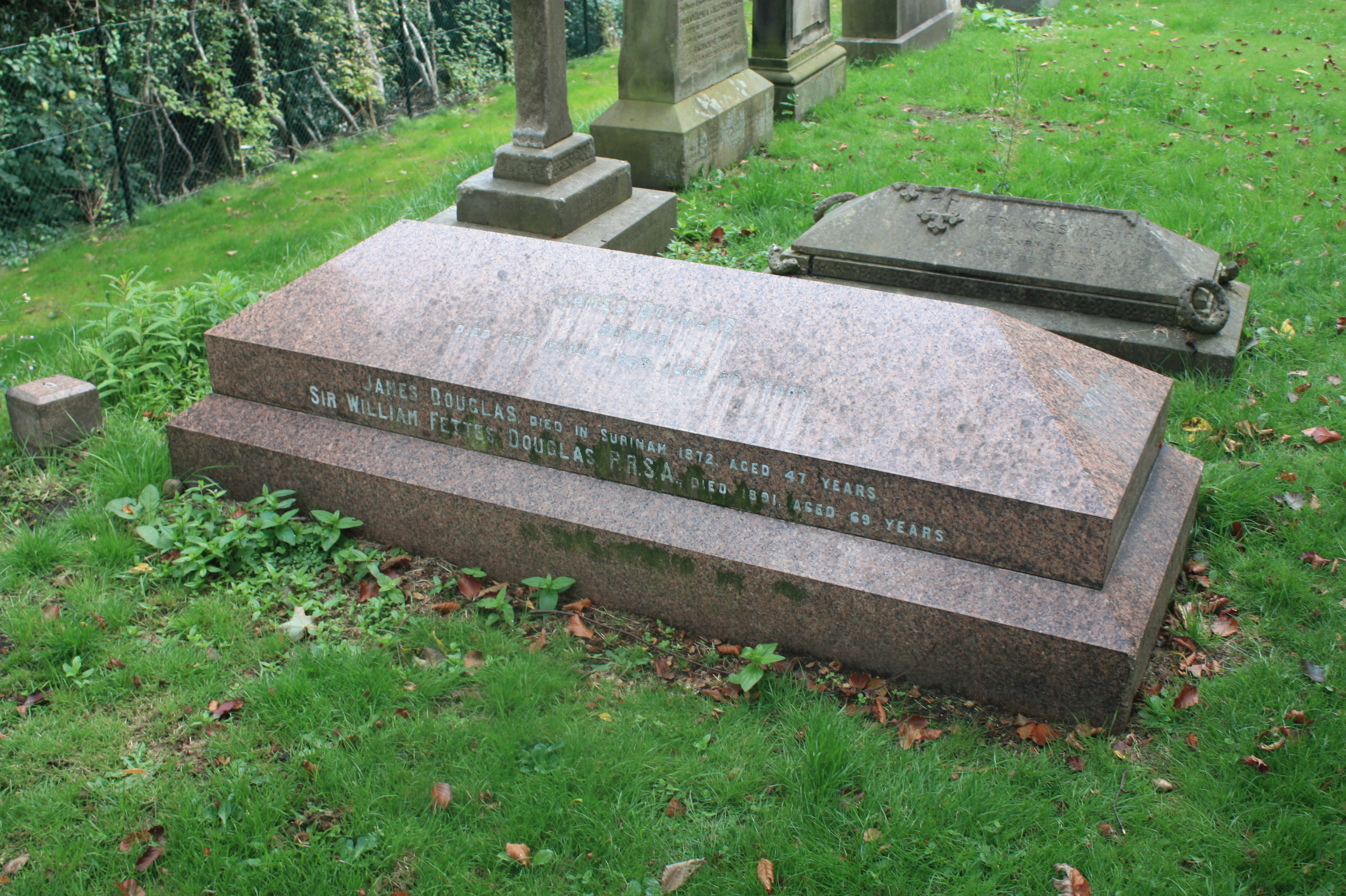
Grave of Sir William Fettes Douglas, Dean Cemetery

Sir William Fettes Douglas PPRSA (1822–1891) was a Scottish painter and art connoisseur, rising to be President of the Royal Scottish Academy.

== Life ==
He was born on 12 March 1822 at 26 Rankeillor Street in Edinburgh's South Side, the eldest son of James Douglas, a banker in the Commercial Bank of Scotland and his wife, Martha Brook, grand-niece of Sir William Fettes, bart., the founder of Fettes College.

On the completion of his education at the High School of Edinburgh, in 1836 he entered the Commercial Bank of Scotland, in which his father was accountant. His father was an amateur artist of some talent, and the son was encouraged to devote the free time of his ten years bank's service to painting and drawing.

In 1847, he resolved to become an artist. Beyond a few months in the Trustees' Academy, then under Sir William Allan, he did not receive any systematic training, but he disciplined his hand and eye by the care and accuracy of the drawing he did by himself, and he attended the botany and anatomy classes of the university, while at a somewhat later date he painted a good deal in the country with the Faeds and Alexander Fraser, the landscape painter.

In 1845, he exhibited for the first time at the Royal Scottish Academy, and soon his pictures attracted such notice that in 1851 he was elected an associate, and three years later a full member. Some of his finest pictures belong to about this time, and in such as The Ruby Ring (1853); The Execution (1854); The Alchemist (1855); Hudibras and Ralph visiting the Astrologer (1856), an incident from Butler's famous work; The Rosicrucians (1856), one of his finest works in colour; and The False Astrologer, the painter's interest in mystical subjects and his definite leaning to archaeology are clearly visible. Many of them show much of the Pre-Raphaelite spirit, and are remarkable for perfect and detailed handling and rich and beautiful colour. The Summons to the Secret Tribunal (1860); David Laing, LL.D., a portrait picture (1862); and The Spell (1864), are among the more important works of a later date.

In 1859, he made the first of several visits to Italy, where he devoted much time to studying coins and ivories, enamels and bookbindings, of which and other rare and beautiful things he subsequently made a fine collection. Many of his smaller pictures are masterly studies of such objects, and in nearly all of his principal pictures they figure as accessories.

As a collector he is said to have combined the specific knowledge of the connoisseur with the practical and general discernment of the artist; but the only contributions he made to the literature of the subject were the notes in Mr. Gibson Craig's privately issued 'Facsimiles of old Bookbinding' (1882). He also possessed a wide and accurate knowledge of pictorial art, which fitted him admirably for the curatorship of the National Gallery of Scotland, in which he succeeded James Drummond (1816–1877). But here again he wrote nothing, although he incorporated much of what he knew in the catalogue of the gallery. This office he held from 1877 to 1882, when he was elected to the presidential chair of the Royal Scottish Academy, vacant through the death of Sir Daniel Macnee. He was knighted at Windsor on 17 May 1882, and appointed a member of the Board of Manufactures, while in 1884 the university of Edinburgh conferred the degree of LL.D. upon him.

After 1870 he turned more to landscape, and in 1874-5 he produced Stonehaven Harbour and A Fishing Village, which are perhaps the finest pictures that he painted. At this time he lived at 21 Coates Crescent in Edinburgh's affluent West End. But for some time after 1879, the effects of a serious illness laid him aside, and when he resumed his art it was to practise in water-colour only.

From 1877 to 1882 he served as Principal Curator of the National Gallery of Scotland, being succeeded by Gourlay Steel.

His drawings are small in size but very charming, and show a true appreciation of the medium. In the National Gallery of Scotland, he is represented by three characteristic works; South Kensington Museum has The Alchemist, and Glasgow Corporation Galleries Bibliomania. His works are displayed at such notable museums as the National Galleries of Scotland, Harvard University Art Museums, the National Portrait Gallery, Tate Gallery, and the Victoria and Albert Museum.

He died at Newburgh, Fife, on 20 July 1891, but is buried in the south-west spur of Dean Cemetery in Edinburgh with other family members.

== Family ==
His youngest brother was Charlie Douglas, who after working for the bank for some years went to New Zealand and became a notable explorer.

In November 1880, he married Marion, second daughter of Baron Grahame of Morphie (who lived at Ravelrig House, Balerno). There were no children. His portrait, painted by Sir George Reid in 1883, hangs in the library of the Scottish Academy. It is reproduced in photogravure in the selection from his works published by the Royal Association for the Promotion of Fine Arts (1885), and edited by John Miller Gray.
