= Patrick Dudgeon =

British mineralogist

FRSE DL Patrick Dudgeon
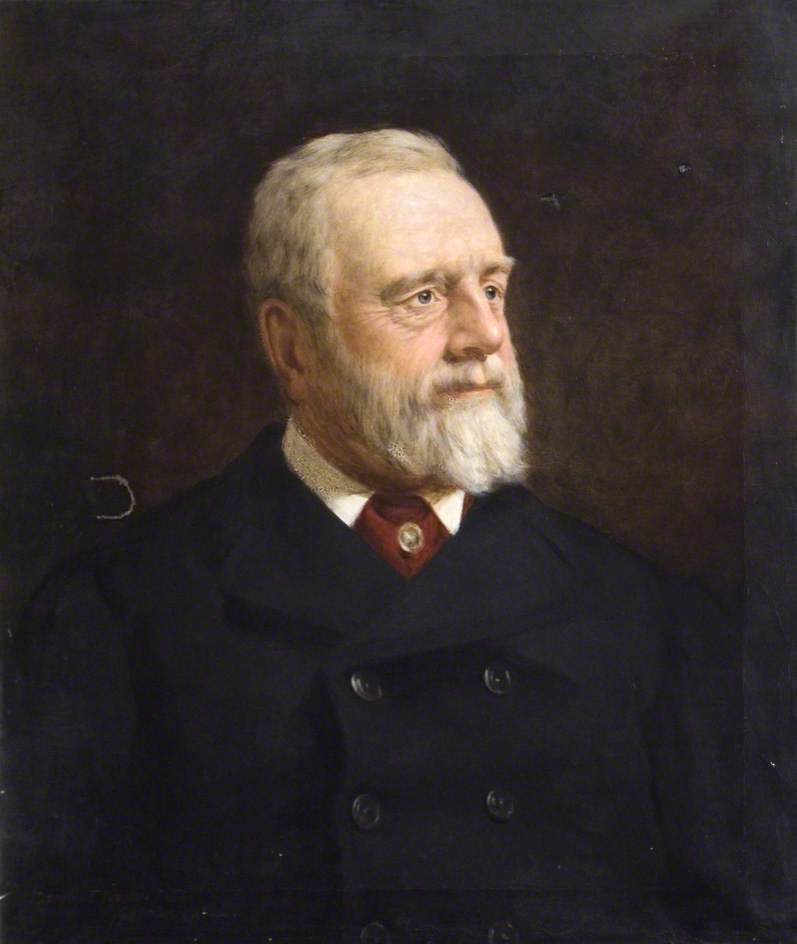
- Born: 1817; Restalrig, Edinburgh, Scotland
- Died: 1895 (aged 77–78)
- Scientific career
- Fields: Mineralogy, meteorology

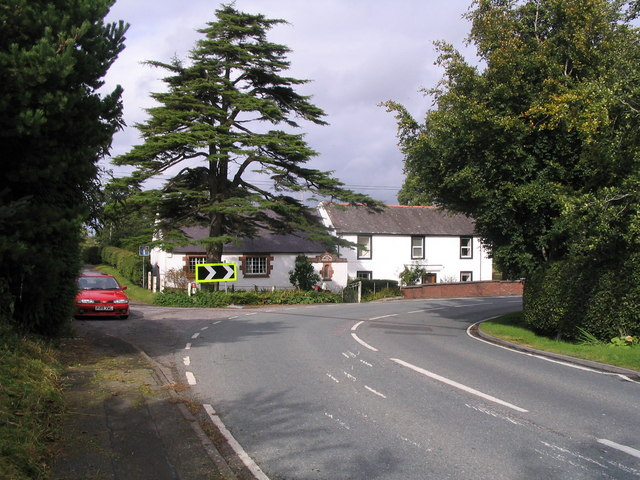
The Patrick Dudgeon Memorial Hall at Islesteps

Patrick Dudgeon of Cargen FRSE DL (1817–1895) was a British landowner, mineralogist and meteorologist. He was co-founder with Matthew Forster Heddle of the Mineralogical Society in Great Britain in 1876.

He had a specialist interest in minerals embedded in rock crystal. His mineral collection was one of the largest known and a large proportion of this is now held by National Museums Scotland.

== Life ==
He was born in Marionville House in Restalrig, Edinburgh, the son of Robert Dudgeon, a Liverpool-born merchant, and co-founder of the Royal Insurance Company. He was educated at Edinburgh Academy.

He trained as a lawyer and qualified as a writer to the signet (WS). In 1840 he was living and working from 3 Queen Street in the city centre.

He spent many years living in China (1833 to 1849), collecting mineral specimens both here and in Japan, which had only recently opened its borders to Europeans. Returning to Scotland in 1850 he became associated with Prof Matthew Forster Heddle. They jointly undertook a survey of the Faroe Islands in the 1850s followed by surveys of the Shetland Islands and Orkney. He bought the Cargen estate in 1853 and built the huge Scots Baronial building known as Cargen House in 1870, choosing Charles Kinnear as its architect. He was elected a Fellow of the Royal Society of Edinburgh in 1860 his proposer being Sir William Jardine, 7th Baronet.

From 1867 he was Deputy Lieutenant of Kirkcudbright. During his period in office he is noted for reducing the number of public houses and establishing a free circulating library. He was a Trustee and Director of the nearby Crichton Royal Hospital from 1855 to 1885.

In 1889 he is recorded as purchasing a painting of Greyfriars Bobby by Gourlay Steell.

He died in Cargen House, near New Abbey in Kirkcudbrightshire, Dumfries and Galloway and is buried in Troqueer Churchyard. On his death his estate passed to Col. R. F. Dudgeon. Cargen House survived as a roofless ruin and was finally demolished in the 1980s.

His mineral collection of 3574 items is now held by National Museums Scotland in Edinburgh. The ruins of his Mineralogical Museum still exist on the estate.

== Memorials ==
A community hall, named the Patrick Dudgeon Memorial Hall exists in Islesteps near his home in Dumfries and Galloway.
