= Dubini =

Dubini is a surname. Notable people with the surname include:

- Angelo Dubini (1813–1902), Italian physician
- Benedetta Dubini (born 1987), London-based, Italian-born jewellery designer
- Fosco Dubini (born 1954), Swiss director and documentary filmmaker
- Kevin Dubini (born 1993), Argentine footballer
