= Devergie =

Devergie is a French surname. Notable people with the surname include:

- Marie-Guillaume-Alphonse Devergie (1798–1879), French dermatologist
- Martin Devergie (born 1995), French rugby union footballer
- Thierry Devergie (born 1966), French rugby union footballer
