= John Steell =

Scottish sculptor (1804–1891)

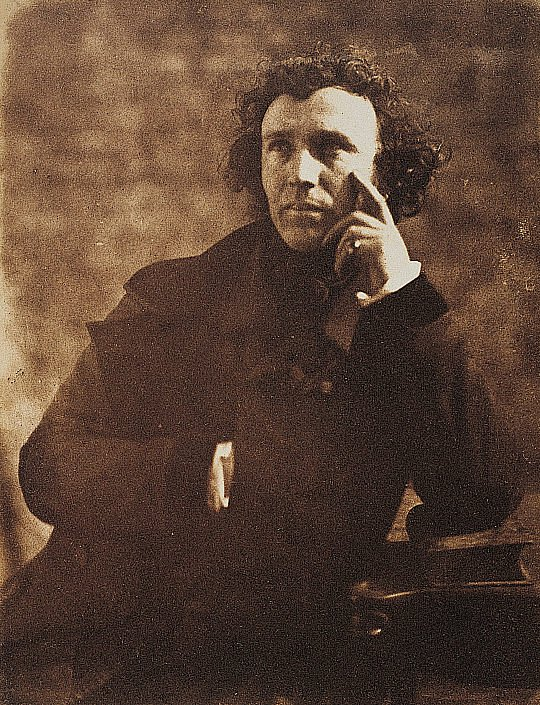
Sir John Steell by Hill & Adamson, circa 1845

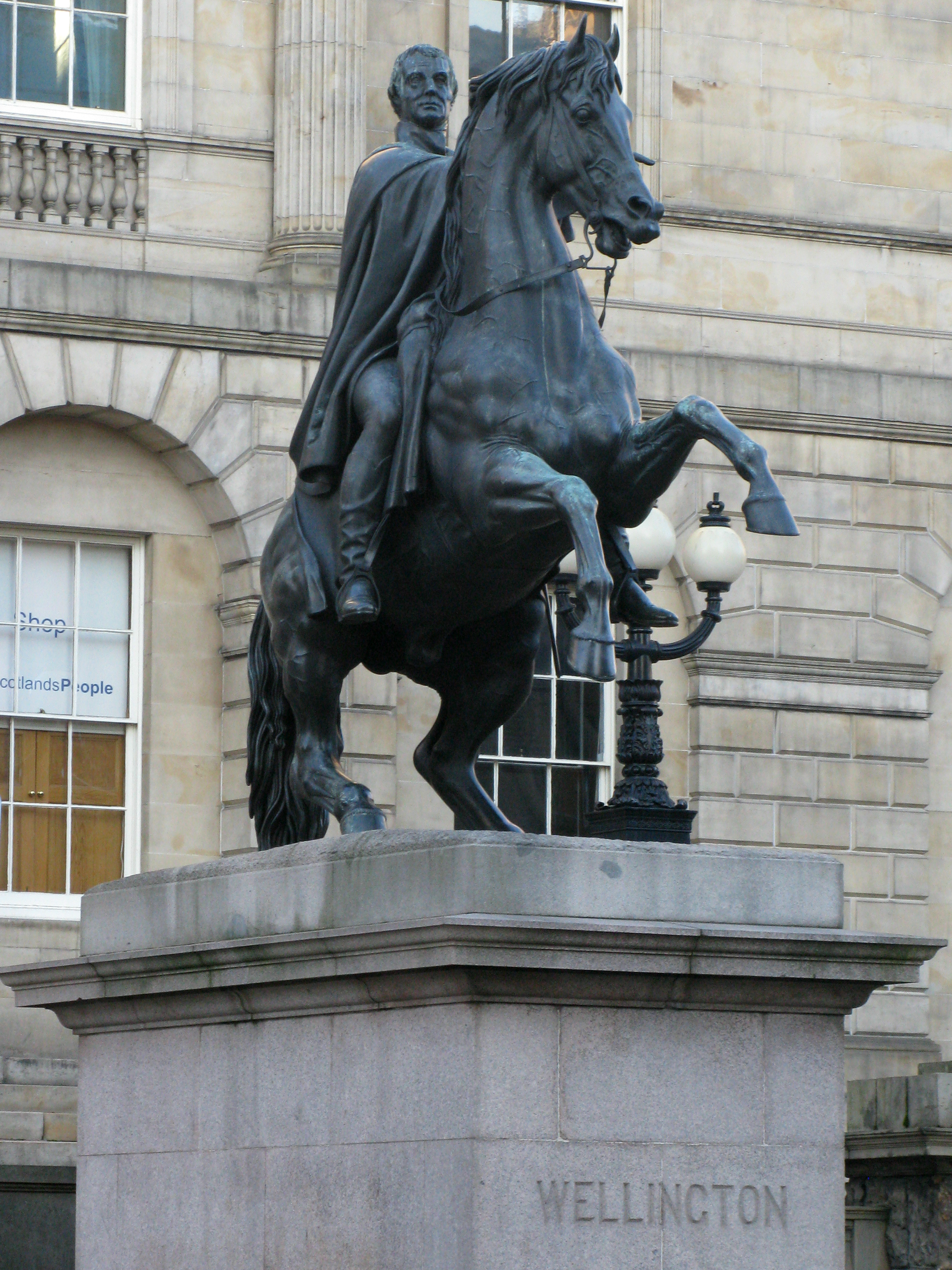
The Duke of Wellington on Princes Street, Steell's most famous work

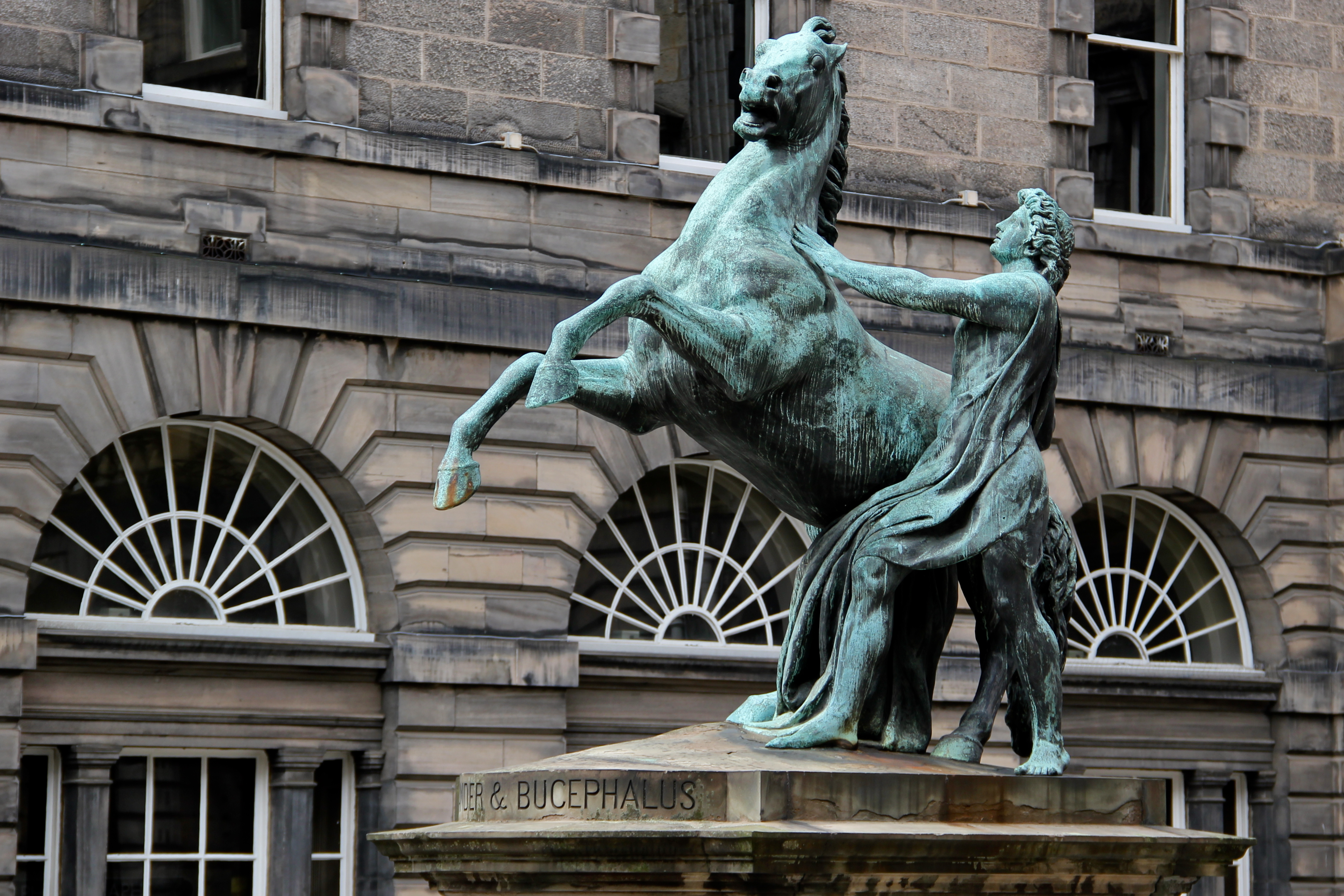
Alexander & Bucephalus by John Steell (Edinburgh City Chambers)

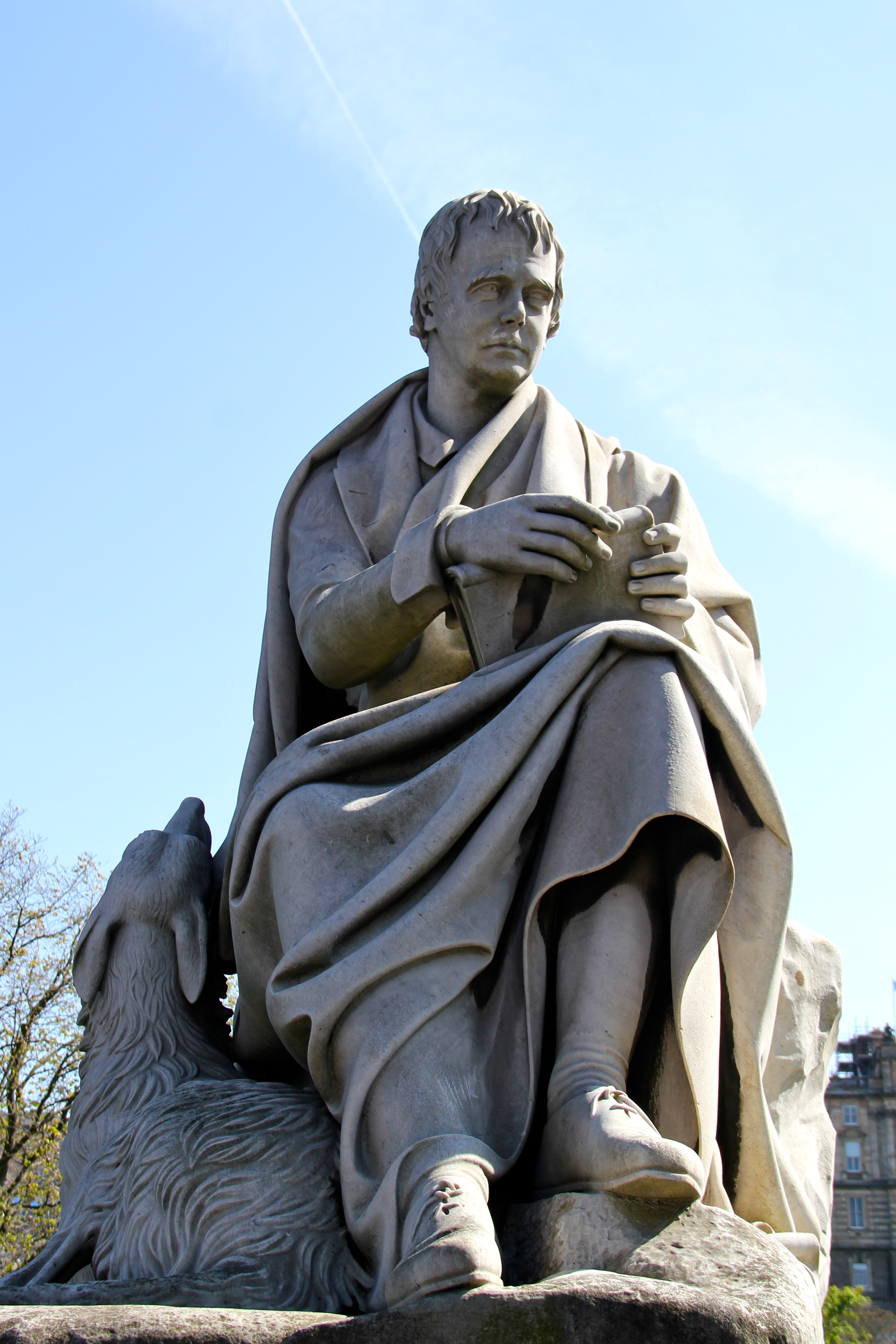
Sir Walter Scott statue at Scott Monument

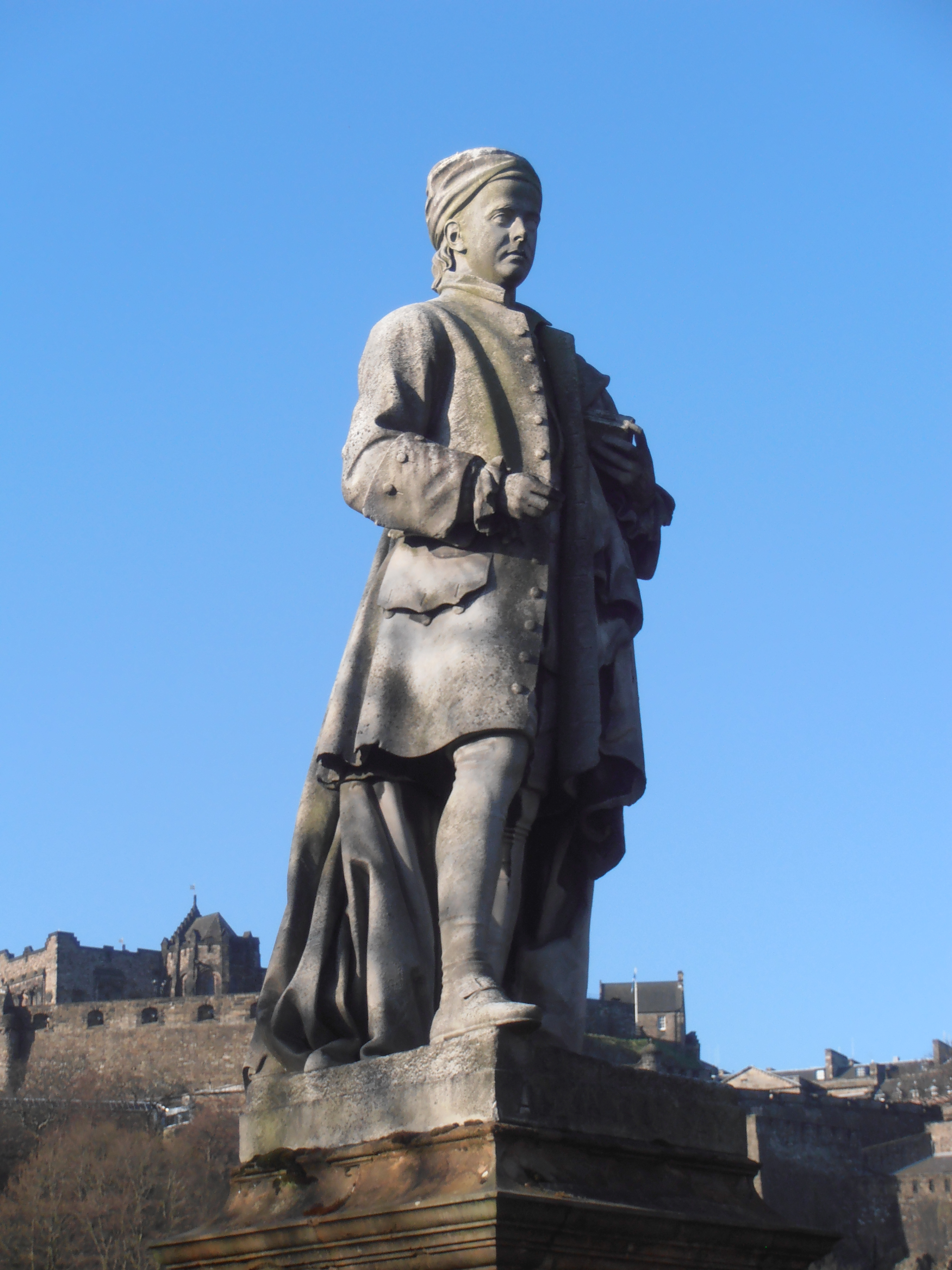
Statue of Allan Ramsay in West Princes Street Gardens, close-up

Sir John Robert Steell RSA (Aberdeen 18 September 1804 – 15 September 1891) was a Scottish sculptor. He modelled many of the leading figures of Scottish history and culture, and is best known for a number of sculptures displayed in Edinburgh, including the statue of Sir Walter Scott at the base of the Scott Monument.

== Biography ==
Steell was born in Aberdeen, but his family moved to 5 Calton Hill in Edinburgh in 1806. He was one of the thirteen children (eleven surviving beyond infancy) of John Steell senior (1779–1849), a carver and gilder, and his wife, Margaret Gourlay, the daughter of William Gourlay, a Dundee shipbuilder. As the family grew they moved to a larger house at 20 Calton Hill. Due to his father's own fame as a sculptor, for much of his early working career he is referred to as John Steel Junior.

Steell initially followed his father, training to be a carver himself, being apprenticed in 1818. In 1819 his father was declared bankrupt by the Trades of Calton, bringing much shame on the family. However, John Junior showed artistic talent, and despite this, the family sent him to study art at the Trustees Academy in Edinburgh, under Andrew Wilson.

Working with his father from studios at 6 Hanover Street, his first major step came in 1827 when the North British Fire Insurance Company, at 1 Hanover Street, commissioned a huge timber statue of St Andrew to be placed on the outside of their office. now housed within the Lodge Room premises of Lodge Dalkeith Kilwinning in Dalkeith. The work appears closely based on a sketch of a statue of St Andrew in Rome by François Duquesnoy. As the office stood immediately opposite the Royal Scottish Academy it was quickly noticed by Edinburgh's artistic society, and acknowledged as a fine work. In 1829, spurred on by the success of this work, he travelled to Rome to study sculpture more intensely.

The first work to attract international attention was Alexander taming Bucephalus carved in 1832–33 (cast in bronze in 1883, and now standing in the quadrangle of Edinburgh City Chambers). Around 1838 he was appointed as Sculptor to Her Majesty the Queen, a post which was later recognised as part of the Royal Household in Scotland. In 1840 he opened Scotland's first foundry on Grove Street in Edinburgh, dedicated to sculpture, to cast his statue of Wellington himself.

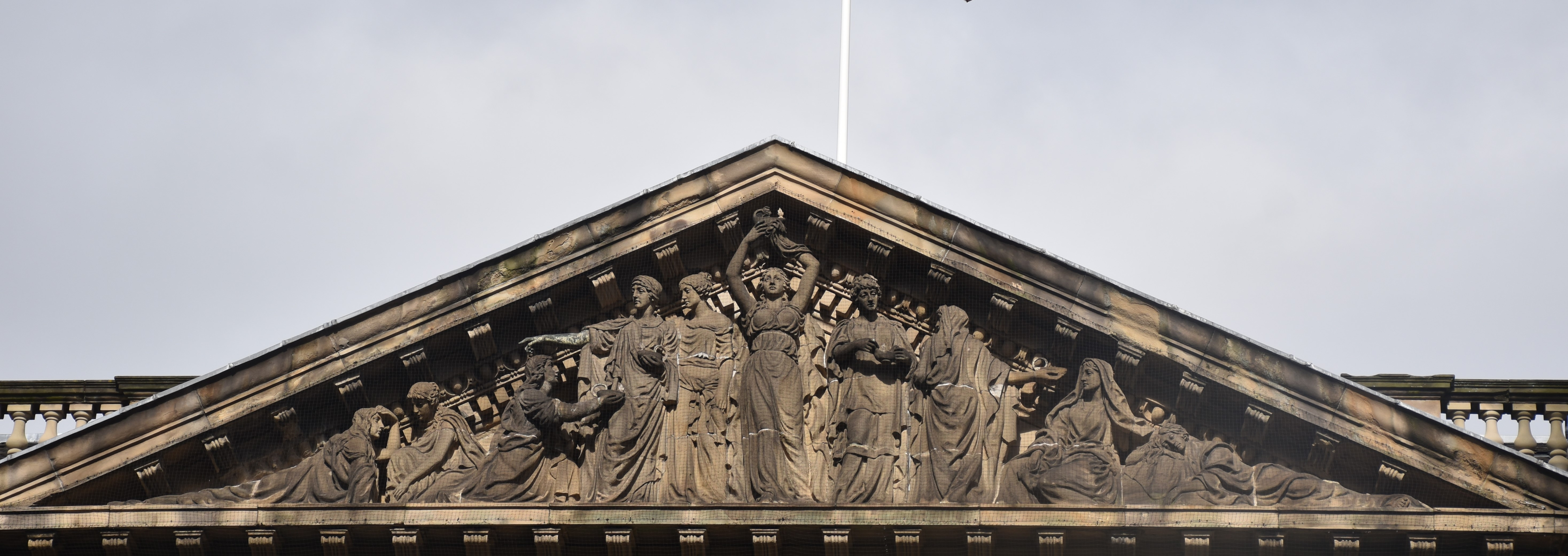
Parable of the Wise and Foolish Virgins (1839), tympanum, Standard Life Assurance building, 1 George Street, Edinburgh

In 1854 he commissioned a new house for himself at 24 Greenhill Gardens and lived there for the rest of his life. His fame by then was international, receiving commissions from the United States, Canada and New Zealand. Prior to this he had lived at 3 Randolph Place on the edge of the Moray Estate in Edinburgh's West End.

He exhibited at the Royal Scottish Academy and the Royal Academy, and was knighted in 1876 following the unveiling, by Queen Victoria, of his statue The Prince Consort, which stands in the centre of Charlotte Square in Edinburgh.

Steell died at home, 24 Greenhill Gardens in Edinburgh's southern suburbs, on 15 September 1891 and is buried in an unmarked grave in Edinburgh's Old Calton Cemetery. This grave was purchased by his father John Steell senior and many members of the Steell and Gourlay families are also interred there.

== Family ==
In 1826 he married Elizabeth Graham, daughter of John Graham, an Edinburgh merchant.

His eldest son, William Steell (1836–1917), appears to have been an architect but of minimal note. One of his few recorded works is the pedestal for John's statue of Dr Thomas Chalmers on George Street in Edinburgh.

His youngest son, Graham Steell was a prominent British physician and cardiologist who is best known for identifying the cardiac murmur that bears his name.

Sir John Steell's brother Gourlay Steell was a noted animal painter: he was Queen Victoria's animal painter, taking over from Sir Edwin Landseer. Many of Gourlay Steell's paintings remain in the private collection of Queen Elizabeth II. His portrait was painted by Robert Scott Lauder and William Grant Stevenson (Aberdeen Art Gallery).

== Works ==
Steell's works include:

- a wooden statue of St Andrew in the Dalkeith Kilwinning No. X masonic lodge, Dalkeith (1827) – the work originally at 1 Hanover Street in Edinburgh
- a stone statue of St Andrew based on the wooden statue above, now at the Wardlaw Museum at the University of St Andrews
- an embellishment for the Scottish Widows building in 5 St Andrew Square, 1832
- a wooden statue of a Moor smoking a pipe (shop sign) (1835) now in the National Museum of Scotland and attributed there to "J Steele"
- a bust of Wardlaw Ramsay in the Scottish Missionary Society Hall, Edinburgh, 1838
- the statue of Sir Walter Scott sitting with his dog Maida under the Scott Monument, carved 1840–46 from a single 30 ton block of Carrara marble
- a stone statue of Queen Victoria on top of the Royal Scottish Academy (originally called Edinburgh's Royal Institution), 1844
- a bust of the Duke of Wellington at Eton College, 1845
- a bust of the Duke of Wellington at Apsley House, 1846.
- pediment of the Head Office of the Bank of Montreal in Montreal, 1847
- a statue of artist Allan Ramsay at the foot of The Mound in Edinburgh, 1850
- a bronze equestrian statue of the Duke of Wellington outside Register House in Edinburgh, 1852. When it was unveiled the press dubbed the statue "the Iron Duke in bronze by Steell".
- the gravestone of Professor John Wilson in Dean Cemetery in Edinburgh, 1854
- a statue of Professor John Wilson in Princes Street Gardens, Edinburgh, 1856
- a statue of Lord Melville the centrepiece of Melville Street in Edinburgh, 1857
- a bust of Lord Cockburn standing in Parliament House, Edinburgh, 1857
- a statue of Lord Jeffrey also in Parliament House, 1857
- a bust of Sir John McNeill, Scottish National Portrait Gallery, Edinburgh, 1859
- a bronze bust of Florence Nightingale, on display at Derby Museum and Art Gallery, Derby, 1862.
- a statue of James Wilson, founder of The Economist at the Tower Knowe, Hawick, 1863 (installed in August 2017 but unveiled officially on 14 September 2017), carved from a single block of Carrara marble
- a monument to the Duke of Atholl at Blair Atholl, Perth, 1864
- a statue of Lord Dalhousie, in Calcutta, 1864.
- a monument to soldiers from the 93rd Sutherland Highlanders regiment who fell in the Crimean War, situated in Glasgow Cathedral, 1869
- a seated statue of Scottish national poet Robert Burns in Central Park, New York City, 1871
- a monument to Dean Ramsay east of St John's Church, on Princes Street Edinburgh, 1875
- a bust of Thomas de Quincey in the Scottish National Portrait Gallery, 1876
- a statue of Prince Albert (entitled The Prince Consort) in Charlotte Square in Edinburgh, 1876
- a statue of Dr. Thomas Chalmers in George Street, Edinburgh, 1878
- a bust of Warburton Begbie in the Royal College of Surgeons of Edinburgh, 1879
- a seated statue of Sir Walter Scott in Central Park, New York City, 1880.
- a statue of Robert Burns in Dundee, 1880
- a statue of Robert Burns on the Embankment in London, 1884
- a bust of Robert Burns in Westminster Abbey, 1885
- a statue of Robert Burns in Dunedin, New Zealand, 1887
- a bronze bas relief funerary panel of Lord and Lady Rutherfurd, and later a marble bust of Lady Rutherfurd, modelled after her death mask
- a bust of Earl Grey in the Council Chambers, Edinburgh
- the statue Alexander taming Bucephalus in the courtyard in front of Edinburgh's City Chambers
- a statue of early Scottish parliamentarian George Kinloch in Dundee
- a bust of Thomas Charles Hope

== Gallery ==
Wooden Statue of St Andrew within the premises of Lodge Dalkeith Kilwinning No

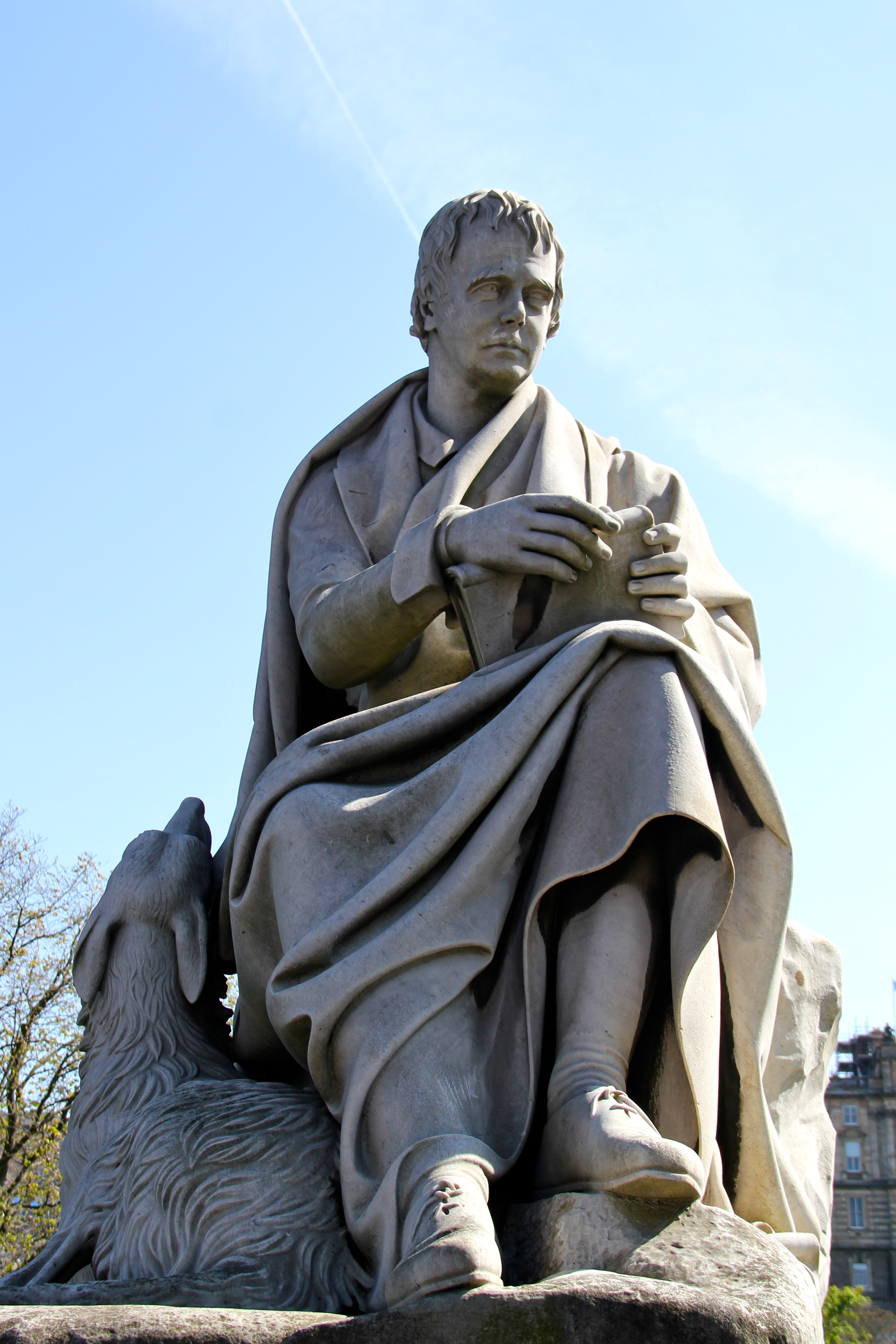
Statue of Sir Walter Scott at the Scott Monument in Edinburgh

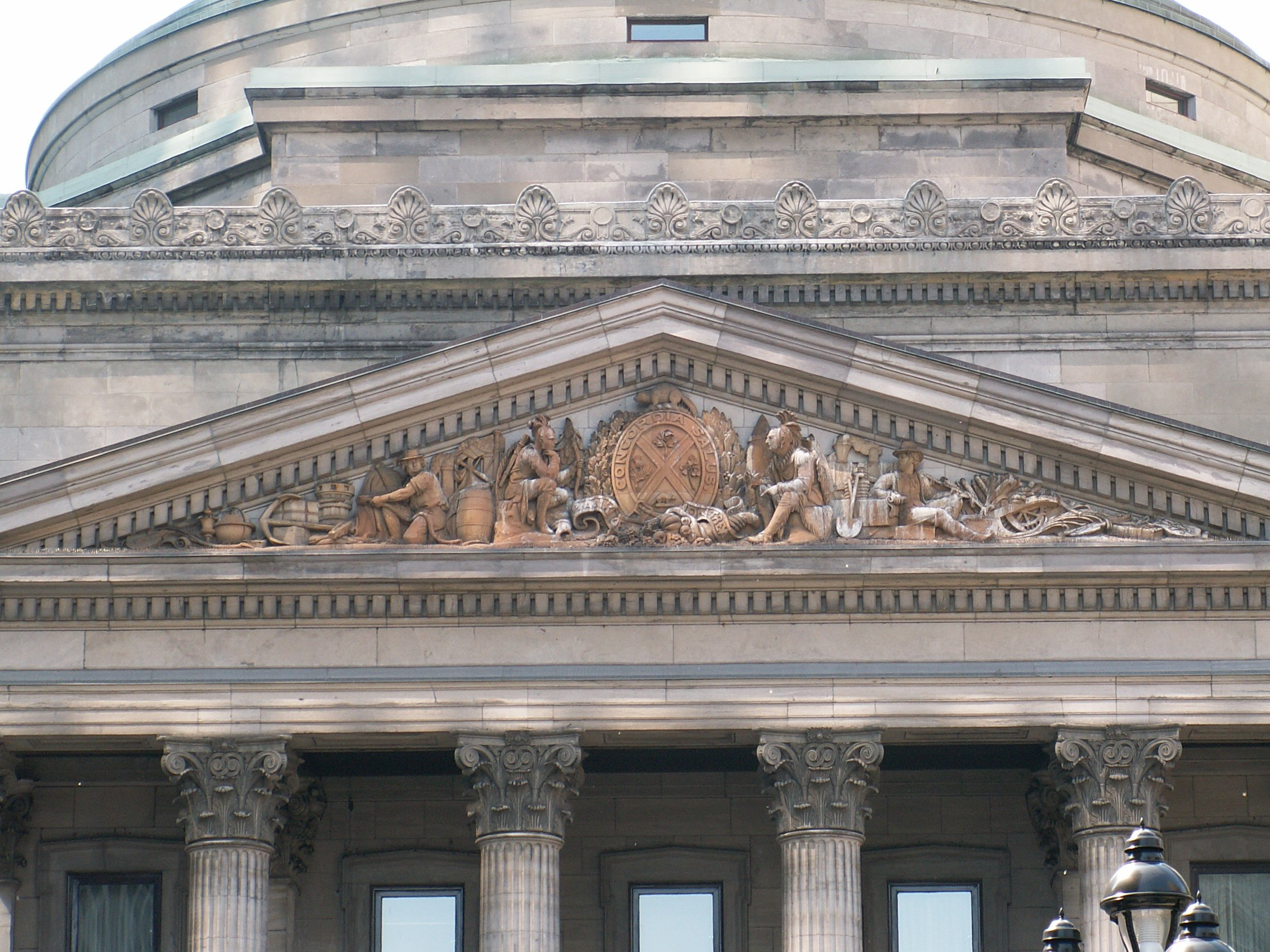
Pediment of the Bank of Montreal Head Office, Montreal

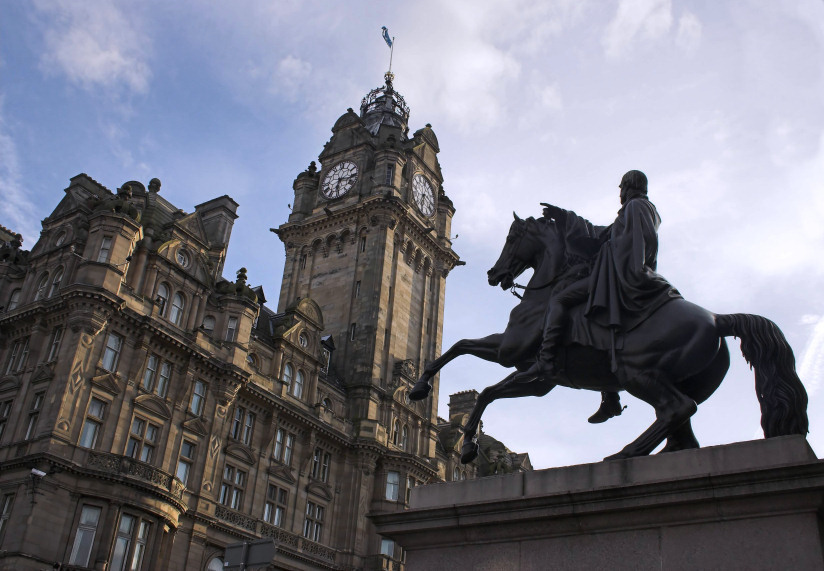
The Iron Duke in bronze by Steell, Edinburgh, with Balmoral Hotel in background

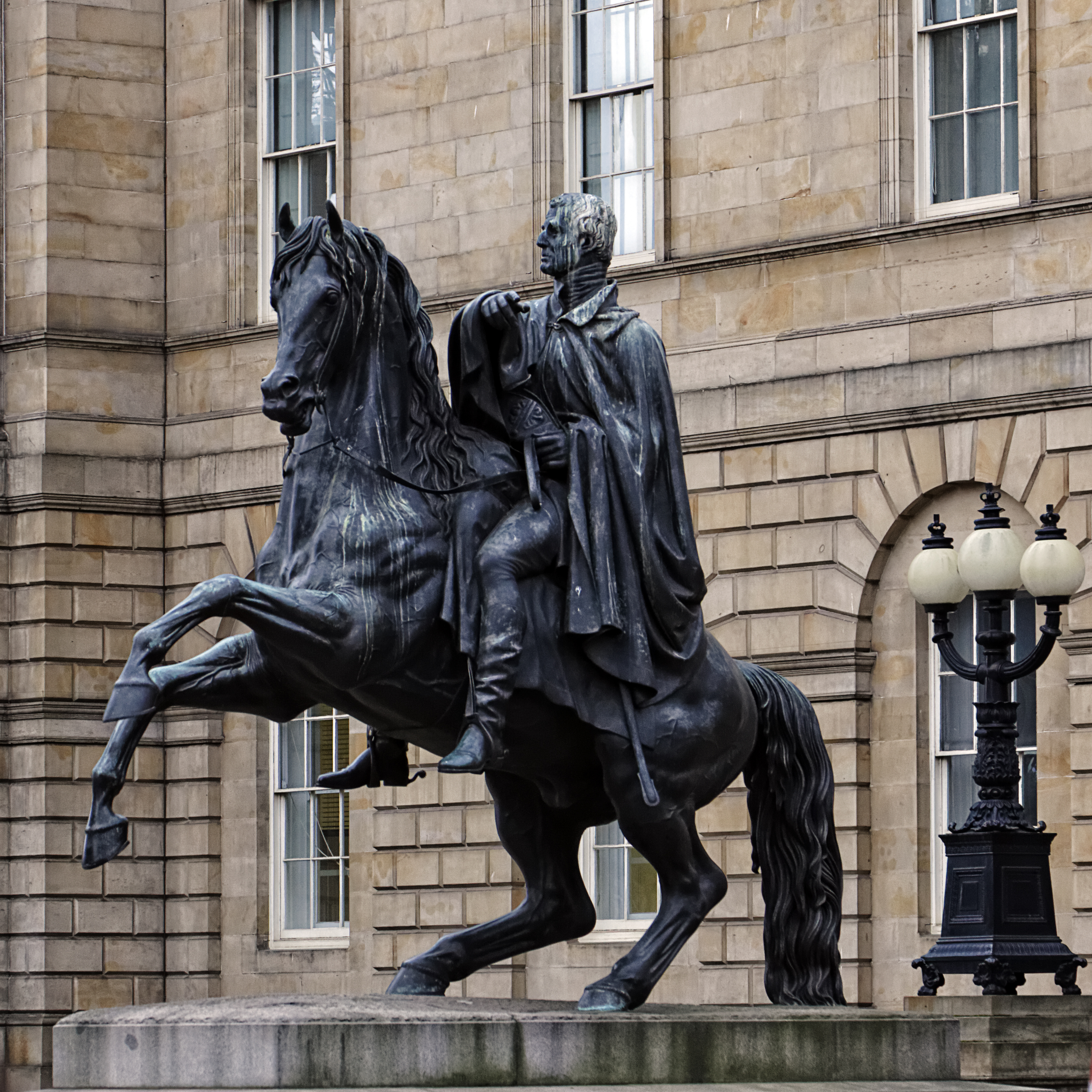
The Iron Duke in bronze by Steell, Edinburgh

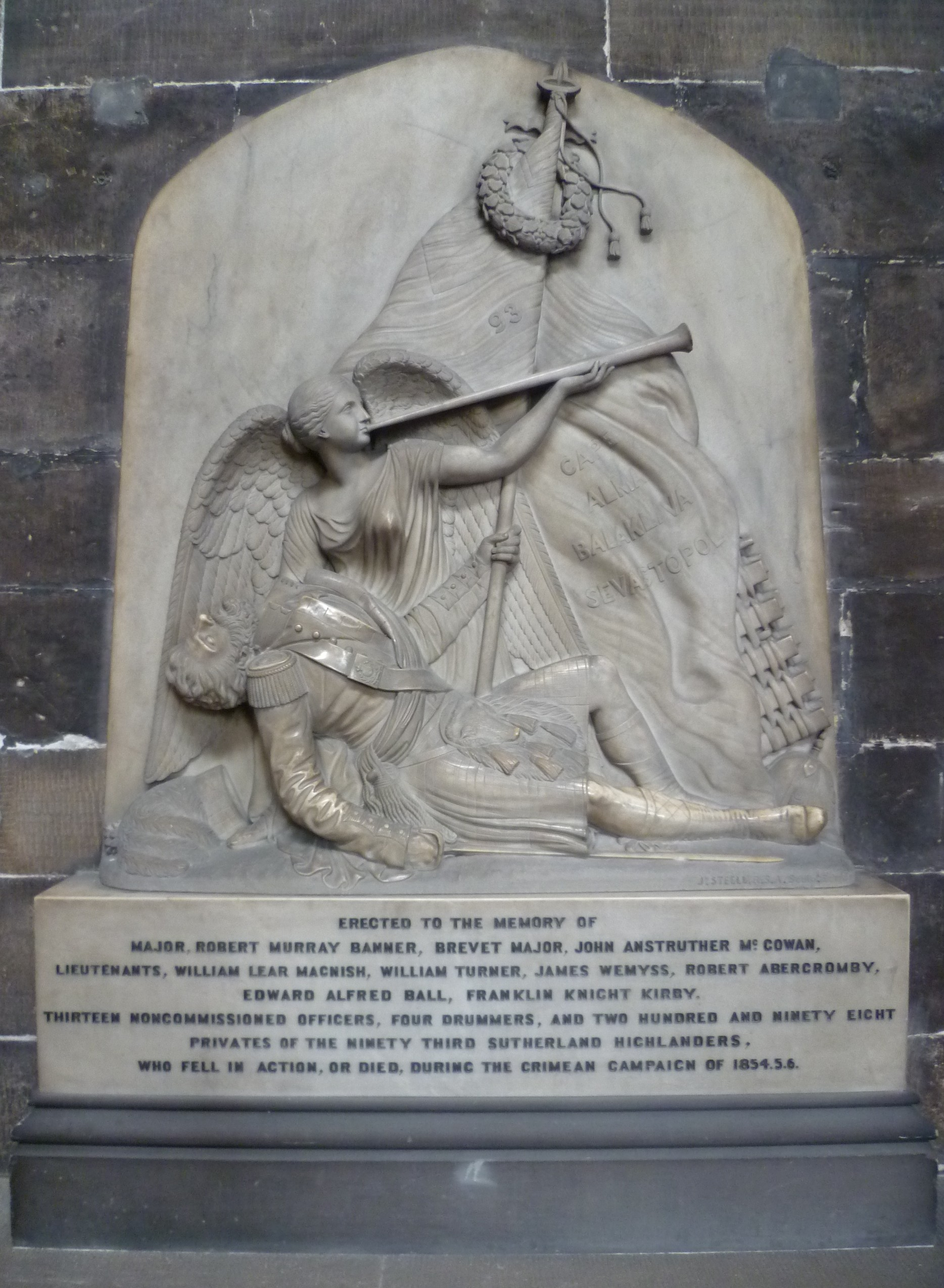
93rd Sutherland Highlanders memorial, Glasgow Cathedral

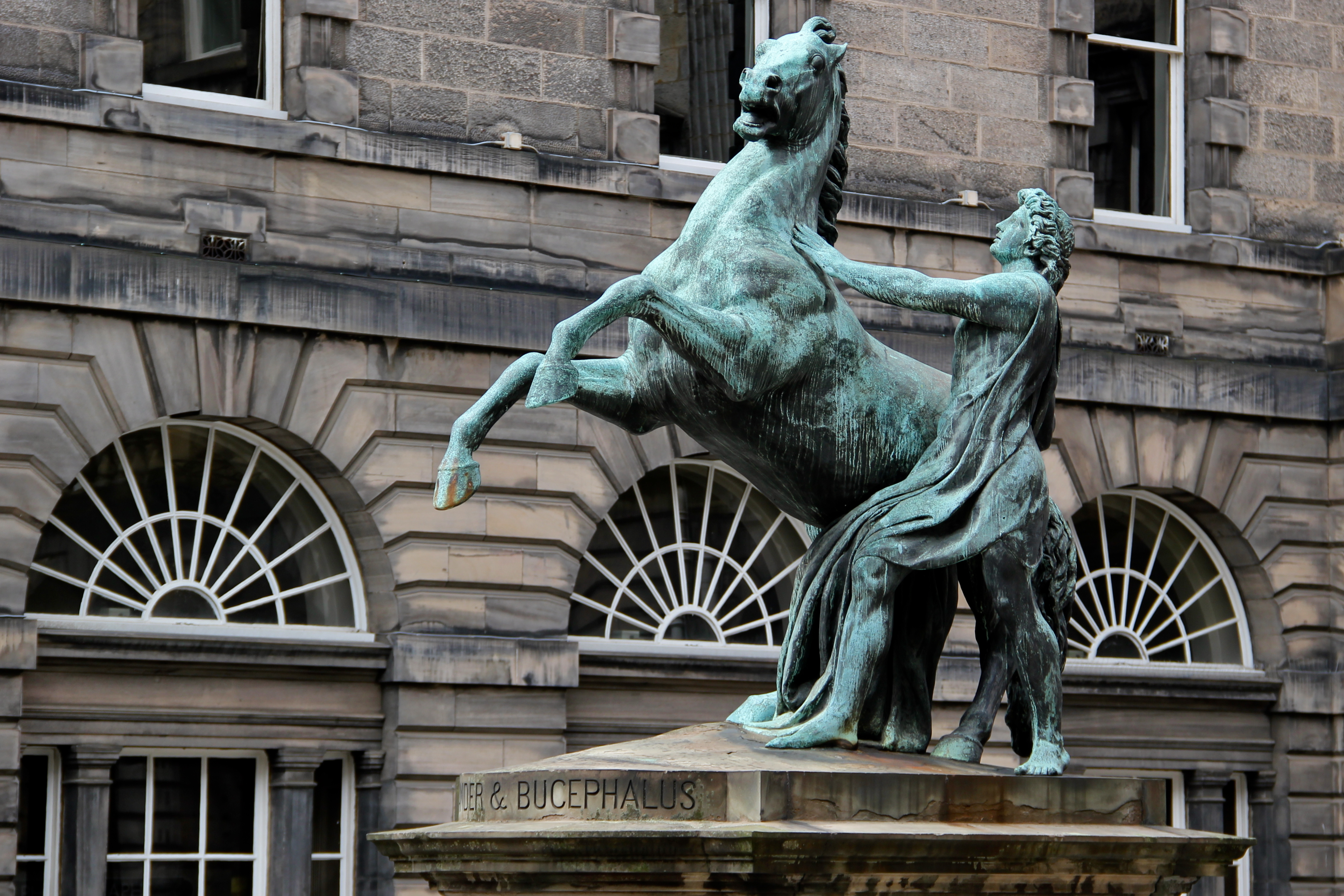
Alexander taming Bucephalus in Edinburgh

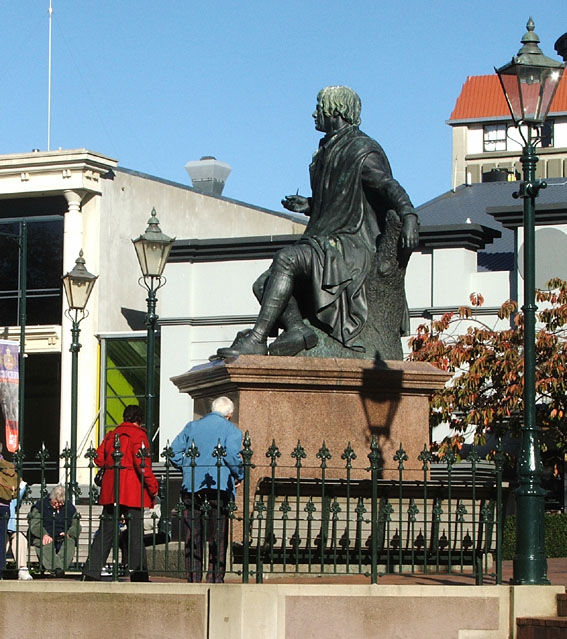
Statue of Robert Burns in The Octagon, Dunedin, New Zealand

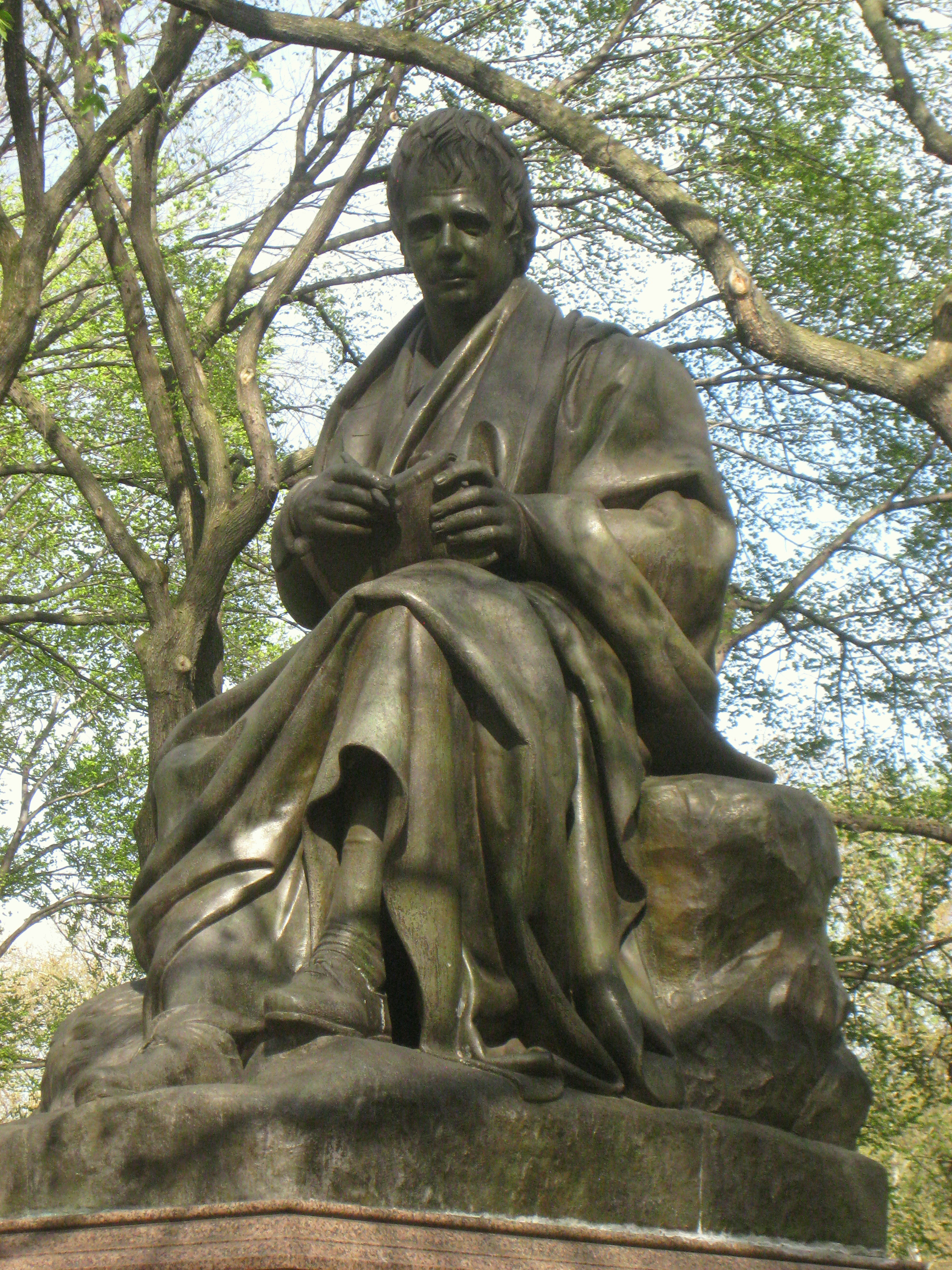
Statue of Sir Walter Scott in Central Park, New York City
