= Graham Steell murmur =

- Differential diagnosis: pulmonary regurgitation

A Graham Steell murmur is a heart murmur typically associated with pulmonary regurgitation. It is a high pitched early diastolic murmur heard best at the left sternal edge in the second intercostal space with the patient in full inspiration, originally described in 1888.

The murmur is heard due to a high velocity flow back across the pulmonary valve; this is usually a consequence of pulmonary hypertension secondary to mitral valve stenosis. The Graham Steell murmur is often heard in patients with chronic cor pulmonale (pulmonary heart disease) as a result of chronic obstructive pulmonary disease.

In cases of mitral obstruction the murmur is occasionally heard over the pulmonary area and below this region, for the distance of an inch or two along the left border of the sternum. It's also rarely over the lowest part of the bone itself, a soft blowing diastolic murmur immediately following P2.

It is named after Graham Steell.
