= Gourlay Steell =

Scottish artist (1819–1894)

- Born: 22 March 1819; Edinburgh, Scotland
- Died: 31 January 1894 (aged 74); Edinburgh, Scotland
- Known for: Engraving

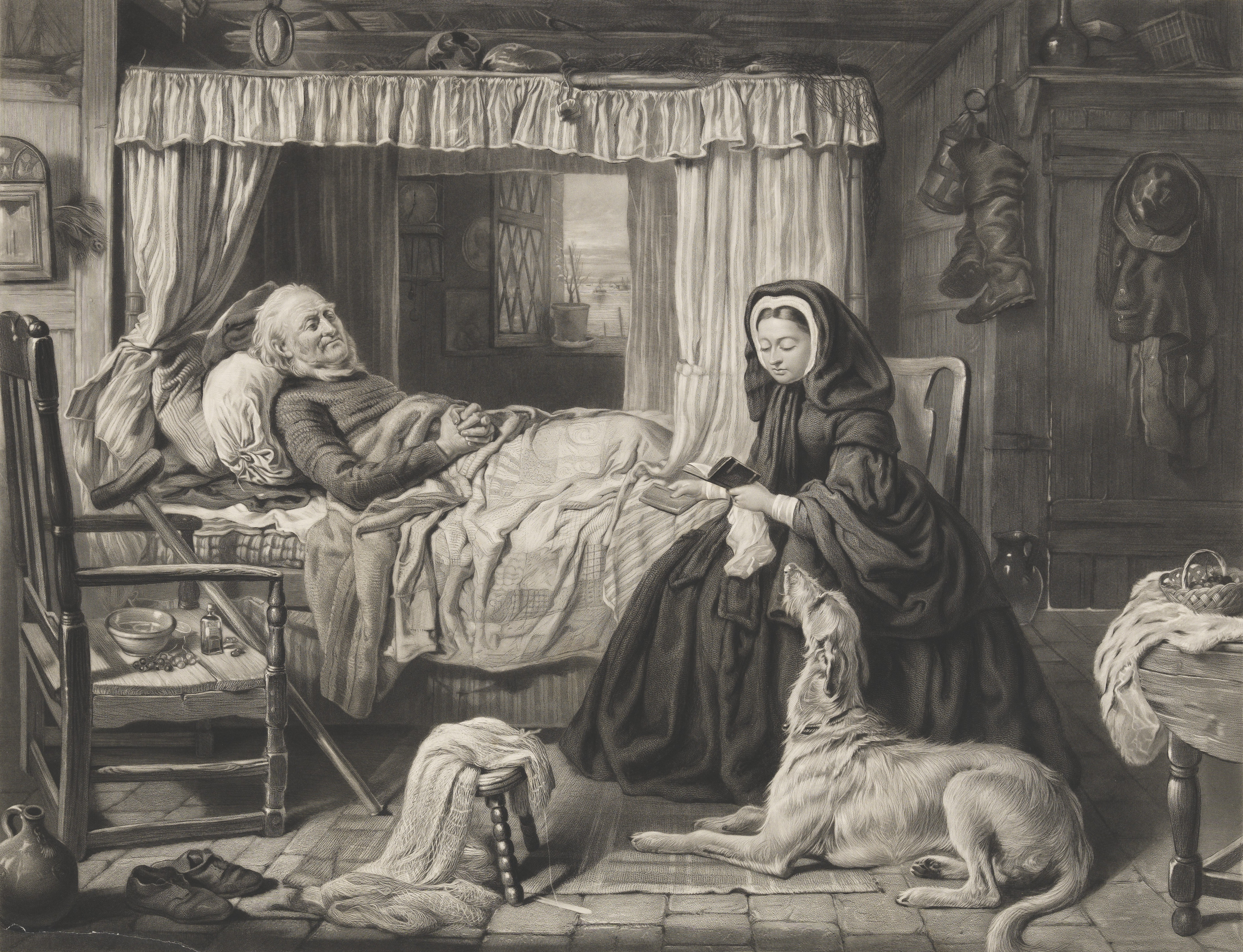
An engraving of "Queen Victoria reading Bible to sick fisherman" originally by Gourlay Steell

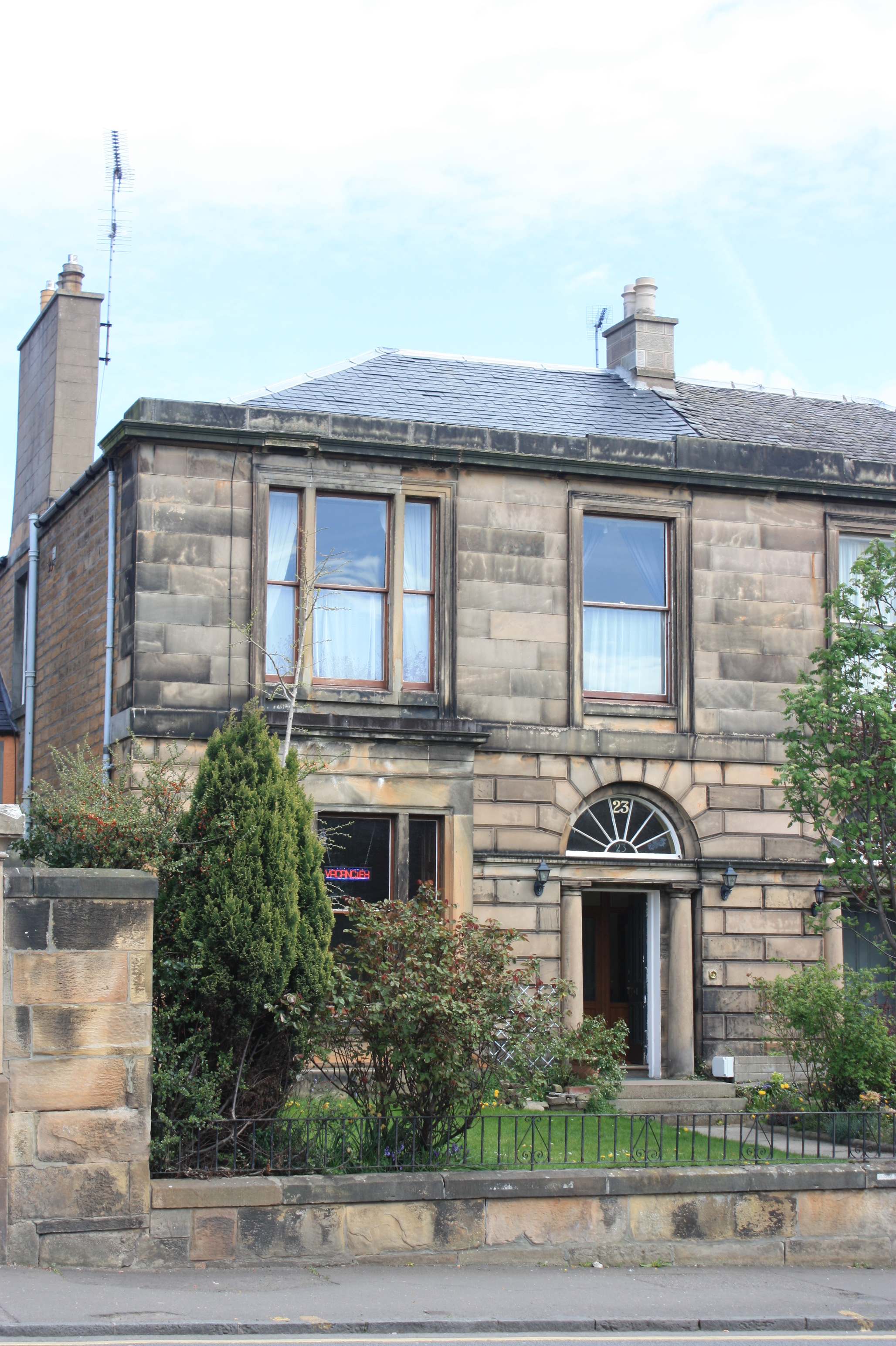
23 Minto Street, Edinburgh, where Gourlay Steell died

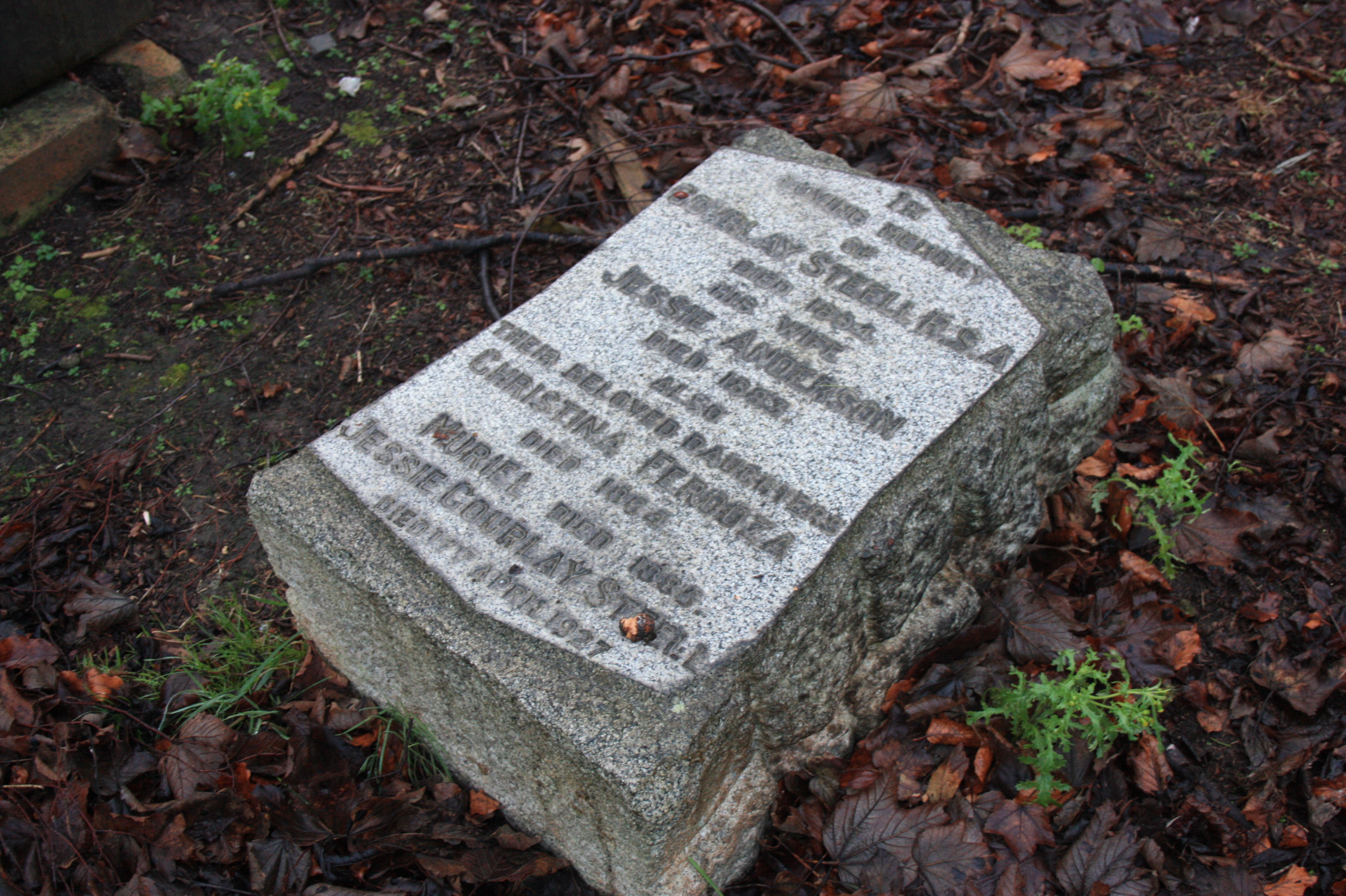
The grave of Gourlay Steell, Morningside Cemetery, Edinburgh

Gourlay Steell RSA (22 March 1819 – 31 January 1894) was a Scottish engraver.

== Life ==
Gourlay was born on 22 March 1819, in Edinburgh, to John Steell, a woodcarver, and Margaret Gourlay of Dundee. His elder brother was sculptor John Steell.

He studied under William Allan and Robert Scott Lauder.

At age 13, he had his first piece displayed at the Royal Scottish Academy, a model of a greyhound, and in 1835 he displayed a full-size sculpture of a bloodhound. From that year until death he exhibited almost continually.

By the 1840s he had established himself and was living in a fine house at 33 East Claremont Street in Edinburgh's New Town.

In 1872, he was appointed the official painter of animals to Queen Victoria, succeeding Sir Edwin Landseer. In 1882, he replaced Sir William Fettes Douglas as Curator of the National Gallery of Scotland. At this time he was living with his family at 4 Palmerston Place in Edinburgh's West End.

In 1882 he succeeded William Fettes Douglas as Principal Curator of the National Gallery of Scotland, serving until death, and eventually after an inter-regnum being replaced by Robert Gibb.

He died on 31 January 1894, aged 74, in Edinburgh, and is buried in Morningside Cemetery, Edinburgh with his wife Jessie Anderson who had died in 1883. The exceptionally modest gravestone has fallen, and lies forlornly in the westmost section of the cemetery, adjacent to modern housing developments.

His son, David George Steell ARSA followed in his footsteps and became an animal artist.

== Works ==
Notable works include:

- Greyfriars Bobby (1889), purchased by Patrick Dudgeon FRSE
- The Shooting Party, Royal Armouries Museum, Leeds
- Deerstalking on Jura, Glasgow Museums
- A Challenge, Glasgow Museums (two Highland cattle fighting)
- The Trysting Place, Glasgow Museums (three dogs)
- A Highland Parting, Dundee Art Gallery and Museum (sheep and Highland cattle at a river)
- John Hay Esq of Letham Grange, Angus Council
- Old Pets of Haddo, National Trust for Scotland (ponies)

== Bibliography ==
- "Steell, Gourlay" . Dictionary of National Biography. London: Smith, Elder & Co. 1885–1900.
