= Graham Steell =

Scottish cardiologist (1851–1942)

Graham Steell (27 July 1851 – 10 January 1942) was a Scottish physician and cardiologist remembered for describing the Graham Steell murmur.

== Biography ==
Graham Steell was born in 1851, the youngest son of Sir John Steell. He was educated at the Edinburgh Academy; his aim was to be a soldier, but he was persuaded to study medicine by a brother. He graduated from the University of Edinburgh in 1872, studied in Berlin and became house physician to George Balfour at the Edinburgh Royal Infirmary. He worked in fever hospitals in Edinburgh, Leeds and London, and was awarded a gold medal for his MD thesis on scarlatina in 1877. In 1878 he moved to the Manchester Royal Infirmary, becoming assistant physician in 1883 and later professor of clinical medicine. He remained there until his retirement.

Many of his early papers concerned fever, but after 1886 his papers concentrated on cardiology. He wrote Diseases of the Heart which was published in 1906. He described the association of oedema and peripheral neuropathy in beer drinkers and patients with beriberi, both now known to be due to thiamine deficiency. He described his eponymous murmur in a paper read to the Manchester Medical Society which was published in 1888. He stressed the importance of disease of the myocardium rather than of the valves, and was an advocate of exercise.

Steell married Agnes Dunlop McKie, who was Lady Superintendent of nurses at the Manchester Royal Infirmary, in 1886. They had one son who was a physician and medical officer to the Ministry of Health.
