= Veranova =

American based contract development and manufacturing organization

- Formerly: J.F. Macfarlan Ltd (1780–1829); J.F. Macfarlan and Co Ltd. (1830–1961); Edinburgh Pharmaceutical Industries (1962); Macfarlan Smith Ltd (1963–1989); Meconic (1990–2000); Johnson Matthey Health (2001–2022)
- Company type: Limited Partnership
- Industry: Contract development and manufacturing organization (CDMO)
- Headquarters: 25 Patton Road, Devens, MA 01434
- Area served: Worldwide
- Key people: Mike Riley (CEO)
- Website: https://veranova.com/

Veranova, L.P. (formerly Johnson Matthey Health) is an American multinational contract development and manufacturing organization (CDMO) based in Devens, MA, with operations in North America and Europe.

The company focuses on the process, development, and manufacturing of active pharmaceutical ingredients (APIs), particularly specialty and highly regulated, complex chemistries. It has two divisions, Generics and Originators. Its specialized drug development and manufacturing technologies and expertise in the pharmaceutical and biotechnology industries span the drug development lifecycle.

Johnson Matthey Health was purchased in 2022 by Altaris Capital Partners for £325 million (JM retaining 30% equity) and rebranded to become Veranova; the name originates from the combined Latin words ‘vērus’, meaning ‘true’, and ‘nŏvus’, meaning ‘new’.

== History ==
=== 19th century ===
==== J.F. Macfarlan, Duncan Flockhart, and T&S Smith ====
Through its original founding companies, the history of Veranova can be dated back to 1780, when the Edinburgh apothecary supplier, J.F. Macfarlan, was founded. In 1815, John Fletcher Macfarlan, a licentiate of the Membership of the Royal Colleges of Surgeons, became the owner of the family business and acquired the apothecary shop on Edinburgh's High Street where he began manufacturing the opium derivative laudanum. In 1830, a partnership was established with Macfarlan's former apprentice, David Rennie Brown, and the business became J. F. Macfarlan and Co. By 1832, J.F. Macfarlan and Co. was manufacturing morphine acetate (medicinal heroin) and hydrochloride, resulting in the development and production of anesthetics including synthetic chloroform and diethyl ether. J.F. Macfarlan collaborated with Joseph Lister, known as the father of modern surgery, to start production of the first sterile dressings in 1870.

In 1827, Thomas and Henry Smith established T&S Smith. Initially producing photographic paper and chemicals, it went on to be the first business to develop apomorphine in large amounts for commercial use. Not long after T&S Smith was established, William Flockhart, an Edinburgh-based pharmacy, started manufacturing chloroform and laudanum.

In 1817, Percival Norton Johnson set up a gold assaying business in London, and in 1851, George Matthey became a partner, forming Johnson Matthey (JM).

=== 20th century ===
==== Macfarlan Smith, Meconic ====
During World War I, T&H Smith and Duncan Folkhart produced morphine and chloroform for medicinal purposes. Throughout the war, J.F. Macfarlan produced approximately 200 tonnes of medicated lint, 7.5 million bandages, and 1477 kilometers of gauze. In 1952, T&H Smith bought Duncan Flockhart and rebranded it as Smith Duncan Flockhart. It went on to produce Bitrex (denatonium benzoate), the world's most bitter substance in 1958.

In 1962, Smith Duncan Flockhart merged with J.F. Macfarlan to form Edinburgh Pharmaceuticals, which in 1965 was bought by Glaxo Group and rebranded as Macfarlan Smith Ltd.

In the 1980s, JM was commercializing platinum-based anti-cancer drugs cisplatin, discovered by JM and Michigan State University in 1970 and expanding into controlled substances. In 1983, JM augmented its API capabilities by opening a manufacturing plant in West Deptford, NJ.

The largest management buy-out in Scotland saw Macfarlan Smith become part of Meconic plc, which was floated on the London Stock Exchange in 1993.

=== 21st century ===
==== Sale of JM Health and rebranding to Veranova ====
JM acquired Meconic in 2001, becoming Johnson Matthey Health (JM Health), and in 2002 bought Pharm-Eco Labs to strengthen JM Health's API offerings. In 2010, JM Health developed its biocatalysis division by purchasing X-Zyme and expanded into China with facilities in Yantai and Shanghai.

2014 saw JM Health purchase Glaxo-Smith-Klein's (GSK) former manufacturing site in Annan, Scotland. Investment into this site led to successful Medicines and Healthcare Products Regulatory Agency (MHRA) Good Manufacturing Practice certification in 2016. In 2015, JM Health bought Pharmorphix® from Sigma-Aldrich, constituting an expansion of the company's solid-state capabilities. Today, Pharmorphix® is the solid form and particle engineering division of Veranova.

In 2021, JM sold its Health division to the US-based healthcare investment firm Altaris Capital Partners LLC (Altaris). JM Health was sold for £325 million enterprise value, with JM retaining 30% equity.

At the time of sale, JM Health had over 900 employees and had taken an underlying operating profit of £31 million in the previous tax year. Altaris moved JM Health HQ to Wayne, Pennsylvania while also keeping its existing facilities in the UK.

Altaris rebranded JM Health as Veranova in 2022. Veranova became an independent company in June 2022 with Niek Stapel as its chief executive officer (CEO). In 2023, Mike Riley took over the role of CEO. Riley appointed Veranova's advisory board, John Nason, Carlo de Notaristefani, Edward Robinson, and Nobel Prize winner Dr Carolyn Bertozzi, to help guide the company scientifically and strategically.

In 2023, Veranova completed a $17 million expansion of its active ingredient (API) manufacturing capabilities in Edinburgh, Scotland.

== Operations ==
Veranova operates within two divisions, Generics and Originators. As a CDMO, Veranova has a range of different offerings within the drug development lifecycle, lying within their Custom Pharma Solutions and Solid Form and Particle Engineering offerings.

== Sites ==
Veranova has its HQ in Wayne, PA with additional sites across the US in Devens and North Andover, MA, and West Deptford, NJ. Veranova also has UK sites in Edinburgh and Cambridge.
