= Matthey =

Matthey is a surname. Notable people with the surname include:

- Arthur Matthey, pseudonym of the French writer Arthur Arnould
- Francis Matthey (born 1942), Swiss politician
- George Matthey (1825–1913), English metallurgist at Johnson & Matthey
- Giles Matthey (born 1987), British actor
- Jeanne Matthey (1886–1980), French tennis player
- Magdalena Matthey (born 1971), Chilean singer-songwriter
- Maurice Matthey, Swiss rower

== See also ==
- Johnson Matthey, British company
- Johnson Matthey Technology Review, Open Access Journal
