= MacFarlan Smith =

Scottish pharmaceutical research company

MacFarlan Smith Ltd.
- Type: Subsidiary
- Industry: Pharmaceuticals
- Predecessor: J.F. Macfarlan; Duncan Flockhart; T&H Smith
- Founded: 1815
- Defunct: June 2022
- Fate: Acquired by Altaris Capital Partners
- Successor: Veranova
- Headquarters: Edinburgh, Scotland, UK
- Area served: Global
- Products: Opiate alkaloids, Bitrex
- Owner: Johnson Matthey
- Website: veranova.com

MacFarlan Smith was a pharmaceutical manufacturing company based in Edinburgh, Scotland, founded in 1815. After its sale from Johnson Matthey in June 2022 to Altaris Capital Partners, Macfarlan Smith rebranded as Veranova. Veranova is a CDMO specialising in the development and manufacturing of specialist and complex active pharmaceutical ingredients, or APIs. It has facilities across Europe and North America.

== Background ==
=== J.F. Macfarlan ===
J.F. Macfarlan Ltd was founded in 1780 as an apothecary supplier. In 1815 John Fletcher Macfarlan, licentiate of the Royal College of Surgeons, became the owner of the family business, and acquired an apothecary's shop in Edinburgh. He immediately began to manufacture laudanum, a medicine based on opium. In 1830 Macfarlan began a partnership with his former apprentice David Rennie Brown, and so incorporated the business as J.F. Macfarlan and Co Ltd. In 1832 the company began manufacture of the medicinal version of heroin and morphine hydrochloride, which led to the development and manufacture of the anaesthetics ether and chloroform. This allowed the company to develop sterile dressings for Joseph Lister, 1st Baron Lister under contract. After acquiring the Abbeyhill chemical works in 1840 for the production of alkaloids, from 1870 the production of codeine began in 1886. The company then acquired another site in Northfield, Edinburgh, in 1900 for the production of strychnine.

=== Duncan Flockhart ===
John Duncan was born in Kinross in 1780. After serving a five-year apprenticeship in Edinburgh, he moved directly to London, before returning to Perth in 1806 to establish a chemists shop.

After expanding to Edinburgh in 1820, Duncan dissolved the partnership with the Perth shop and started a new partnership in Edinburgh with William Flockhart (also from Kinross), which in 1833 was called Duncan & Flockhart, incorporated three years later. Following the death of John Duncan (c. 1839) the firm was taken over by his son Dr James Duncan. In the same year the firm began to manufacture lactucarium, and from 1847 supplied Chloroform to Sir James Simpson. The firm expanded, and supplied chloroform to both the British Army, Royal Navy and British Red Cross during both world wars. After the start of World War I, the company established a drug growing farm at Warriston, to assure supply.

=== T&H Smith ===
T&H Smith was established as a chemists at 21-23 Duke Street, Edinburgh in 1827, by Thomas Smith and his brother Henry. On 13 April 1839, just three months after Henry Fox Talbot had announced his photogenic drawing process, T&H Smith placed an advert in The Scotsman offering photographic paper and chemicals. In 1840, the company bought a site in Canonmills to the north of the city called Blandfield and moved their manufacturing operations here, the company developed the first liquid essence of coffee, later supplemented by creating various carbonated beverage flavours. Having opened a London branch in 1848, in 1851 the company discovered Aloin. But the company fortunes were made from 1855, when the first Morphine injection was developed. T&H Smith was the first company to produce commercial quantities of Apomorphine, and then Diamorphine in 1887. Between 1906 and 1908 the company moved from Canonmills to the suburban outskirts of Edinburgh at Gorgie, to a former brewery that they renamed "New Blandfield Works". During World War I, the company supplied Morphine and over 7,500 long tons (7,600 t) of Lint-based medical dressings to the British Army. In 1919, T&H Smith bought Glasgow Apothecaries. In 1926, the company acquired John Mackay Chemicals, subsequently incorporating its associated subsidiaries in Australia, Canada and New Zealand.

== Foundation ==
In 1962, T&H Smith bought Duncan Flockhart, and then merged with along J.F Macfarlan to form Edinburgh Pharmaceuticals. In 1965 the Glaxo Group bought Edinburgh Pharmaceuticals, rebranding it Macfarlan Smith Ltd.

In 1958, while trying to develop the dental anaesthetic Lignocaine, the company discovered the bitterest known substance, denatonium. Developed as a denaturant for industrial alcohol, in the 1970s it was commercially marketed as Bitrex, a safety additive for household products such as liquid detergents. Tesco was the first supermarket to display the Bitrex brand on their products.

In 1963 a research group led by Professor Kenneth Bentley, working at the company, synthesised the highly potent opioid, etorphine.

Bought through a management buy-out in 1990, Macfarlan Smith was floated on the London Stock Exchange in 1993 under the holding company Meconic, the Greek word for poppy.

== Present ==
In June 2022, Johnson Matthey sold its Health division (including Macfarlan Smith) to Altaris Capital Partners. The company then rebranded as Veranova. Veranova is involved in the development and manufacturing of specialist and complex active pharmaceutical ingredients (APIs) for pharma and biotech customers. With facilities in Europe, North America and Asia.

In 2001, Johnson Matthey plc bought Meconic, and merged it into its Fine Chemical and Catalysts division.

In late 2006, the British government permitted MacFarlan Smith to cultivate opium poppies in the United Kingdom for medicinal reasons, in response to increasing global prices for concentrate of poppy straw, the company's main raw material. A major opium poppy field is based in Didcot, England. As of 2012 they were growing in Dorset, Hampshire, Oxfordshire & Lincolnshire as a spring sown breakcrop recognised under the single payment scheme farm subsidy. The Office of Fair Trading has alerted the government to their monopoly position on growing in the UK and worldwide production of diamorphine and recommended consideration. The government's response advocated the status quo, being concerned interference might cause the company to stop production.

The British government has since contradicted the Home Office's suggestion that opium cultivation can be legalized in Afghanistan for exports to the United Kingdom, helping lower poverty and internal fighting whilst helping the National Health Service to meet the high demand for morphine and heroin. Opium poppy cultivation in the United Kingdom does not need a licence, but a licence is required for those wishing to extract opium for medicinal products.

Macfarlan Smith claims to be one of the world's leading manufacturer of opiate alkaloids. Together with sister companies within the Johnson Matthey group, it provides full spectrum drug development, from drug discovery through to bulk production.
