= Flinders Petrie =

British Egyptologist (1853–1942)

Sir Flinders Petrie FRS FBA
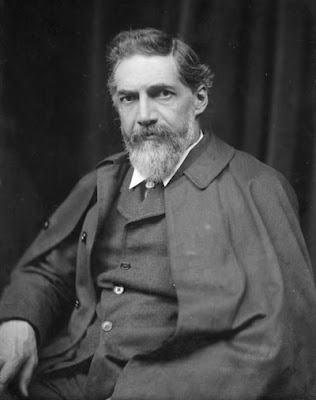
- Petrie in 1902
- Born: William Matthew Flinders Petrie; 3 June 1853; Charlton, Kent, England
- Died: 29 July 1942 (aged 89); Jerusalem, Mandatory Palestine
- Resting place: Mount Zion Cemetery
- Known for: Proto-Sinaitic script, Merneptah Stele, pottery seriation
- Spouse: Hilda Urlin (m. 1896)
- Awards: Fellow of the Royal Society; Huxley Memorial Medal (1906)
- Scientific career
- Fields: Egyptology

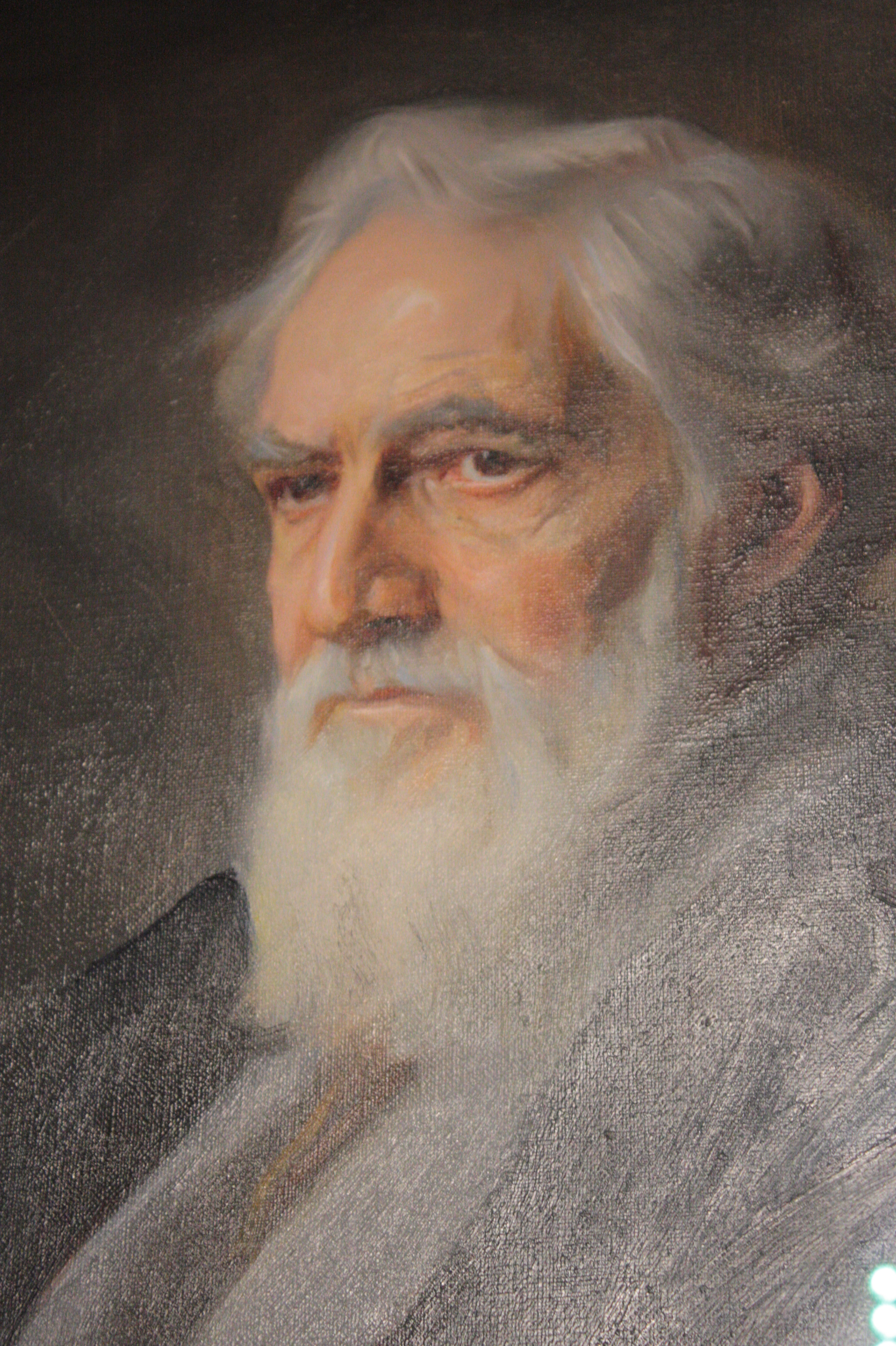
Flinders Petrie by Philip Alexius de Laszlo, 1934 (detail)

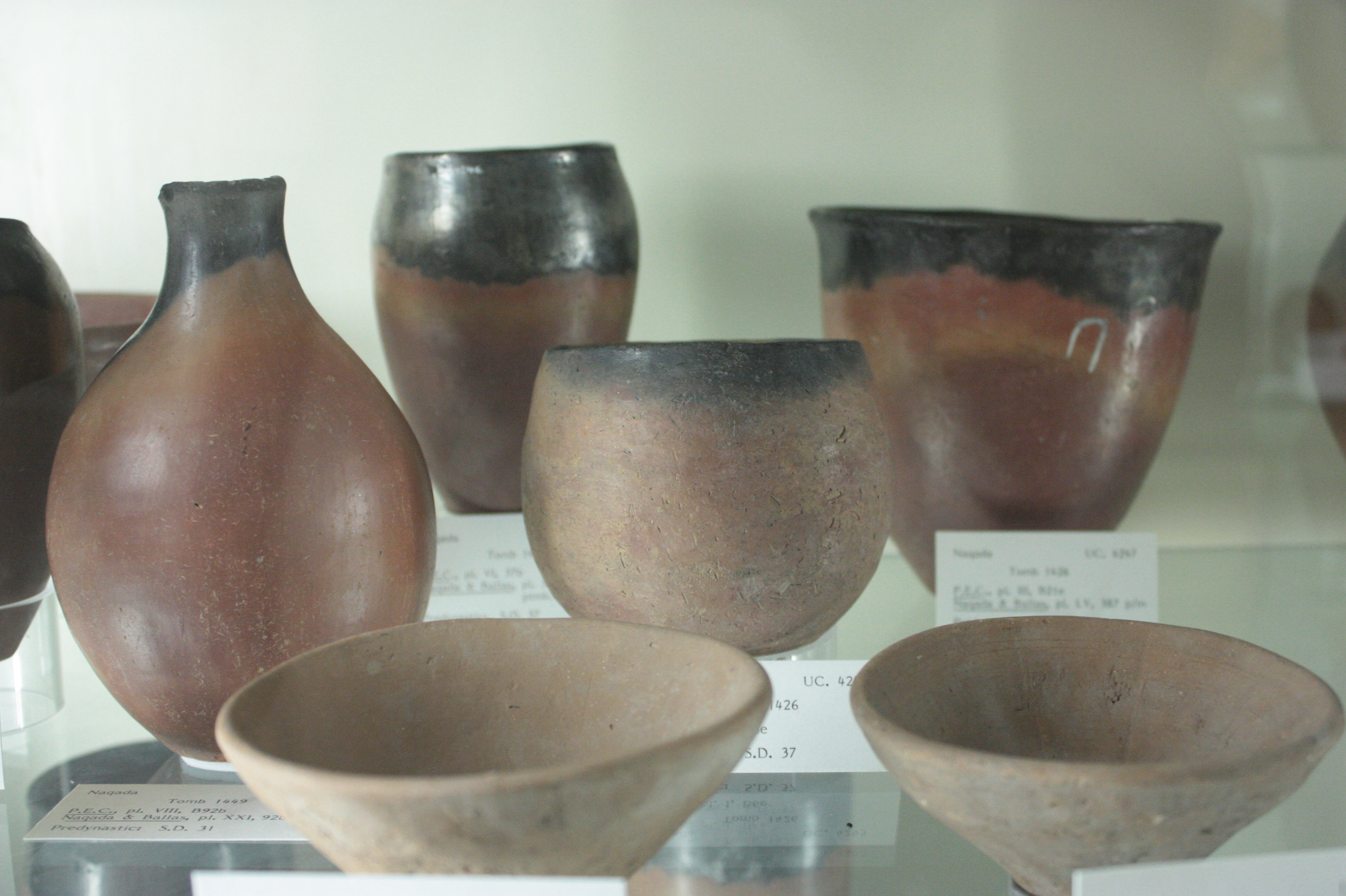
The distinctive black-topped Egyptian pottery of the Predynastic period associated with Flinders Petrie's Sequence dating system, Petrie Museum

Sir William Matthew Flinders Petrie FRS FBA (3 June 1853 – 29 July 1942), commonly known as simply Flinders Petrie, was an English Egyptologist and a pioneer of systematic methodology in archaeology and the preservation of artefacts. He held the first chair of Egyptology in the United Kingdom, and excavated many of the most important archaeological sites in Egypt in conjunction with his Irish-born wife, Hilda Urlin. Some consider his most famous discovery that of the Merneptah Stele, an opinion with which Petrie himself concurred. Undoubtedly at least as important is his 1905 discovery and correct identification of the character of the Proto-Sinaitic script, the ancestor of almost all alphabetic scripts.

Petrie developed the system of dating layers based on pottery and ceramic findings. Petrie has been denounced for his pro-eugenics views; he was a dedicated believer in the superiority of the Northern peoples over the Latinate and Southern peoples.

He has been referred to as the "father of Egyptian archaeology".

== Early life ==
Petrie was born on 3 June 1853 in Charlton, Kent, England, the son of William Petrie (1821–1908) and Anne (née Flinders) (1812–1892). Anne was the daughter of British Captain Matthew Flinders, who led the first circumnavigation of Australia (and after whom Petrie was named). William Petrie was an electrical engineer who developed carbon arc lighting and later developed chemical processes for Johnson, Matthey & Co.

Petrie was raised in a Christian household (his father being a member of the Plymouth Brethren), and was educated at home. He had no formal education. His father taught his son how to survey accurately, laying the foundation for his archaeological career. At the age of eight, he was tutored in French, Latin, and Greek, until he had a collapse and was taught at home. He also ventured his first archaeological opinion aged eight, when friends visiting the Petrie family were describing the unearthing of the Brading Roman Villa in the Isle of Wight. The boy was horrified to hear the rough shovelling out of the contents, and protested that the earth should be pared away, inch by inch, to see all that was in it and how it lay. "All that I have done since," he wrote when he was in his late seventies, "was there to begin with, so true it is that we can only develop what is born in the mind. I was already in archaeology by nature."

== Academic career ==
The chair of Edwards Professor of Egyptian Archaeology and Philology at University College London was set up and funded in 1892 following a bequest from Amelia Edwards, who died suddenly in that year. Petrie's supporter since 1880, Edwards had instructed that he should be its first incumbent. He continued to excavate in Egypt after taking up the professorship, training many of the best archaeologists of the day. In 1904, Petrie published Methods and Aims in Archaeology, the definitive work of his time, in which he defined the goals and methodology of his profession along with the more practical aspects of archaeology—such as details of excavation, including the use of cameras in the field. Insights include the contention that research results were dependent on the personality of the archaeologist, who, he felt, needed to possess broad knowledge as well as insatiable curiosity. His own abundance of that characteristic was never questioned.

In 1913, Petrie sold his large collection of Egyptian antiquities to University College, London, where it is now housed in the Petrie Museum of Egyptian Archaeology. One of his trainees, Howard Carter, went on to discover the tomb of Tutankhamun in 1922.

== Petrie's mental capacity ==
Petrie's extraordinary visual memory

Mr. Flinders Petrie, a contributor of interesting experiments on kindred subjects to Nature, informs me that he habitually works out sums by aid of an imaginary sliding rule, which he sets in the desired way and reads off mentally.
He does not usually visualise the whole rule, but only that part of it with which he is at the moment concerned.
I think this is one of the most striking cases of accurate visualising power it is possible to imagine.
Francis Galton, (1883).

== Archaeology career ==
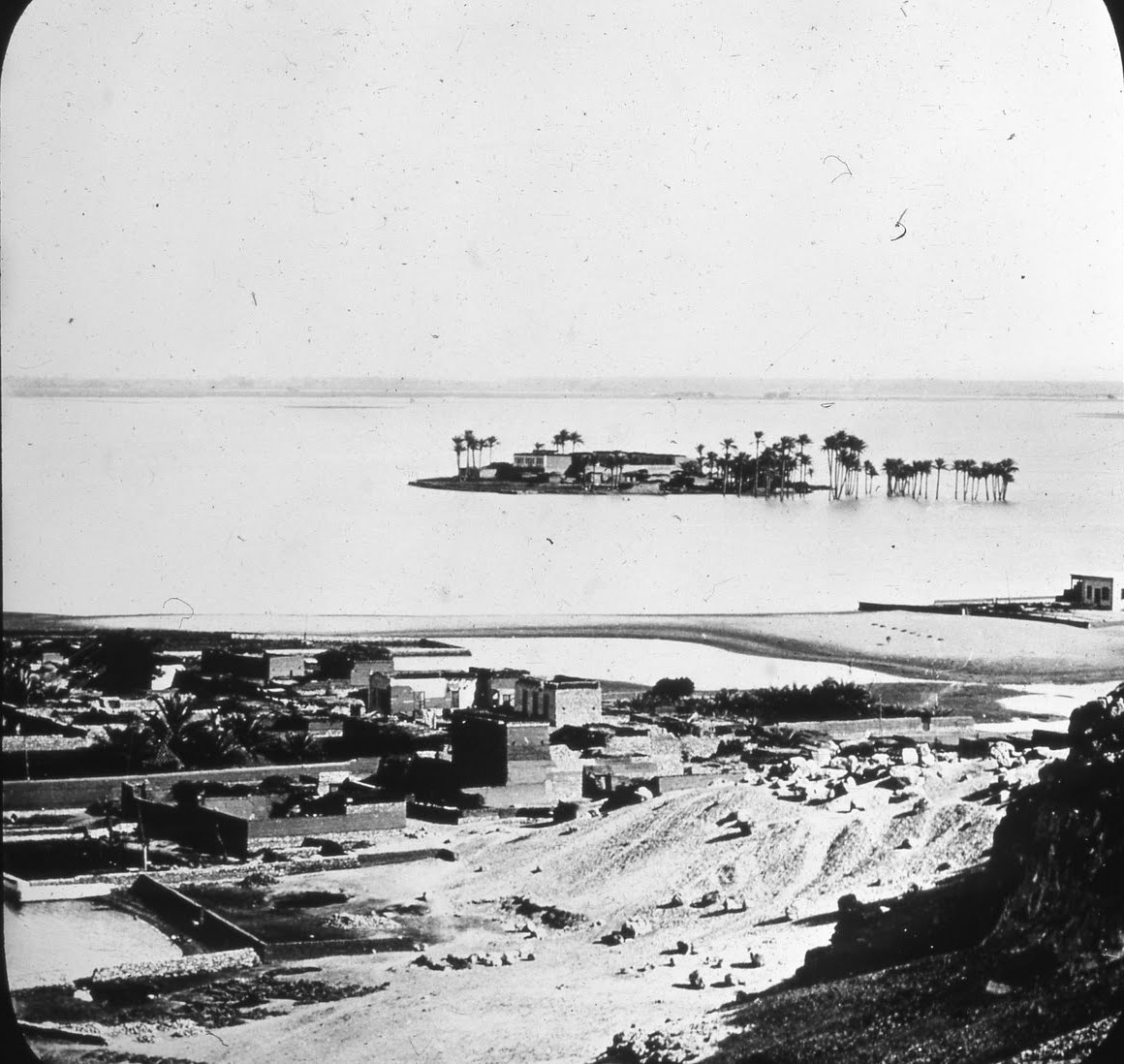
A photograph Petrie took of his view from the tomb he lived in located in Giza, 1881

=== In Britain ===
In his teenage years, Petrie surveyed British prehistoric monuments, in an attempt to understand their geometry. He started with the late Romano-British Rainsborough Camp, which was close to his family home in Charlton.

At age 19, he produced the most accurate survey of Stonehenge at that time (1872-3).

=== Giza survey ===
His father had corresponded with Piazzi Smyth about his theories of the Great Pyramid and Petrie travelled to Egypt in early 1880 to make an accurate survey of Giza, making him the first to properly investigate how the pyramids there were constructed; many theories had been advanced on this, and Petrie read them all, but none was based on first hand observation or logic.

Petrie's published reports of this triangulation survey, and his analysis of the architecture of Giza therein, were exemplary in its methodology and accuracy, disproving Smyth's theories and still providing much of the basic data regarding the pyramid plateau to this day. On that visit, he was appalled by the rate of destruction of monuments (some listed in guidebooks had been worn away completely since then) and mummies. He described Egypt as "a house on fire, so rapid was the destruction" and felt his duty to be that of a "salvage man, to get all I could, as quickly as possible and then, when I was 60, I would sit and write it all".

=== Egypt Exploration Fund affiliation ===
Returning to England at the end of 1880, Petrie wrote a number of articles and then met Amelia Edwards, journalist and patron of the Egypt Exploration Fund (now the Egypt Exploration Society), who became his strong supporter and later appointed him as professor at her Egyptology chair at University College London. Impressed by his scientific approach, the university offered him work as the successor to Édouard Naville. Petrie accepted the position and was given the sum of £250 per month to cover the excavation expenses. In November 1884, Petrie arrived in Egypt to begin his excavations.

=== Koptos ===
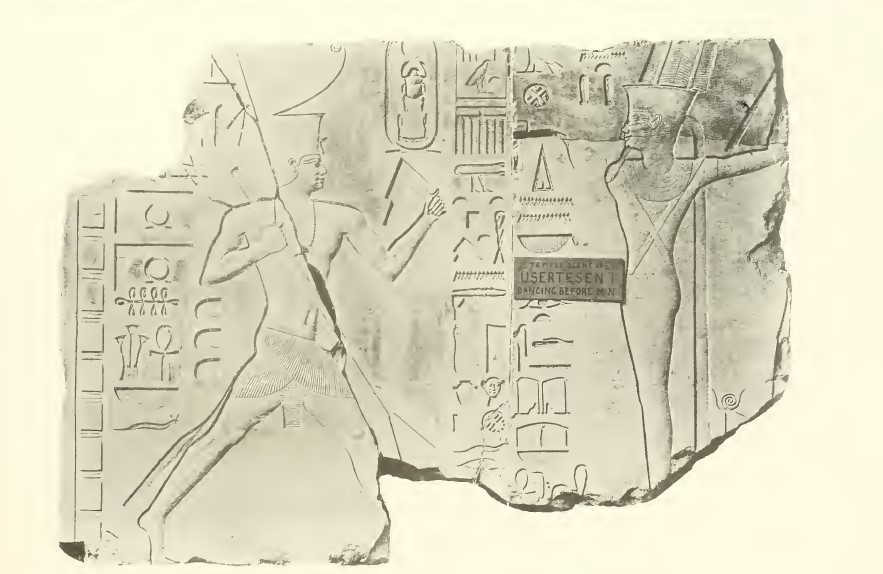
"One of the finest" reliefs Petrie found in Koptos was this ithyphallic representation of Min with Senureset I. Prudery toward erect representations got in the way of photography and exhibition of the city's artifacts in Victorian times into even the 1980s. Here, then-assistant Margaret Murray covered the member for Petrie's photograph. Some items were totally omitted from the initial record to protect sensibilities, which can lead to problems of provenance for archaeological phalloi.

=== Tanis dig ===
He first went to a New Kingdom site at Tanis, with 170 workmen. He cut out the middle man role of foreman on this and all subsequent excavations, taking complete overall control himself and removing pressure on the workmen from the foreman to discover finds quickly but sloppily. Though he was regarded as an amateur and dilettante by more established Egyptologists, this made him popular with his workers, who made several small but significant finds that would have been lost under the old system.

=== Tell Nebesheh dig ===
In 1886, while working for the Egypt Exploration Fund, Petrie excavated at Tell Nebesheh in the Eastern Nile Delta. This site is located 8 miles southeast of Tanis and, among the remains of an ancient temple there, Petrie found a royal sphinx, now located at the Museum of Fine Arts, Boston.

=== Nile and Sehel Island ===
By the end of the Tanis dig, he ran out of funding but, reluctant to leave the country in case it was renewed, he spent 1887 cruising the Nile taking photographs as a less subjective record than sketches. During this time, he also climbed rope ladders at Sehel Island near Aswan to draw and photograph thousands of early Egyptian inscriptions on a cliff face, recording embassies to Nubia, famines and wars.

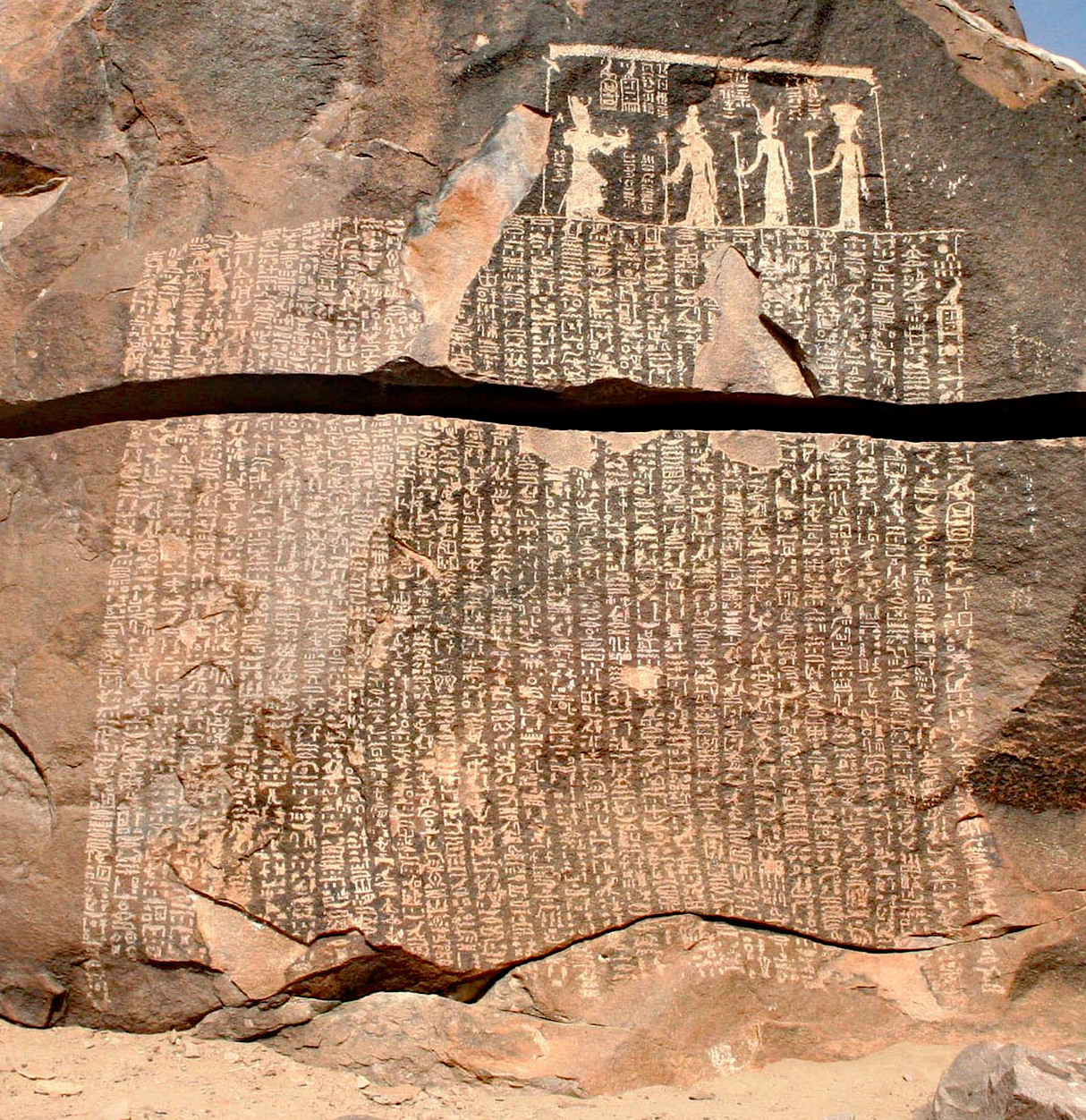
The Famine Stela inscription on Sehel Island in the Nile

=== Fayum burials ===
By the time he reached Aswan, a telegram had reached there to confirm the renewal of his funding. He then went straight to the burial site at Fayum, particularly interested in post-30 BC burials, which had not previously been fully studied. He found intact tombs and 60 of the famous portraits, and discovered from inscriptions on the mummies that they were kept with their living families for generations before burial. Under Auguste Mariette's arrangements, he sent 50% of these portraits to the Egyptian department of antiquities.

However, when he later found that Gaston Maspero placed little value on them and left them open to the elements in a yard behind the museum to deteriorate, he angrily demanded that they all be returned, forcing Maspero to pick the 12 best examples for the museum to keep and return 48 to Petrie, who sent them to London for a special showing at the British Museum. Resuming work, he discovered the village of the Pharaonic tomb-workers.

=== Palestine, Tell Hesi and Wadi Rababah ===
In 1890, Petrie made the first of his many forays into Palestine, leading to much important archaeological work. His six-week excavation of Tell el-Hesi (which was mistakenly identified as Lachish) that year represents the first scientific excavation of an archaeological site in the Holy Land. Petrie surveyed a group of tombs in the Wadi al-Rababah (the biblical Hinnom) of Jerusalem, largely dating to the Iron Age and early Roman periods. Here, in these ancient monuments, Petrie discovered that two different types of cubit had been used as units of length.

=== Amarna ===
From 1891, he worked on the temple of Aten at Tell-el-Amarna, discovering a 300-square-foot (28 m^{2}) New Kingdom painted pavement of garden and animals and hunting scenes. This became a tourist attraction but, as there was no direct access to the site, tourists wrecked neighbouring fields on their way to it. This made local farmers deface the paintings, and it is only thanks to Petrie's copies that their original appearance is known.

=== Discovery of the 'Israel' or Merneptah stele ===
In early 1896, Petrie and his archaeological team were conducting excavations on a temple in Petrie's area of concession at Luxor. This temple complex was located just north of the original funerary temple of Amenhotep III, which had been built on a flood plain. They were initially surprised that this building which they were excavating was also attributed to Amenophis III since only his name appeared on blocks strewn over the site...Could one king have had two mortuary temples? Petrie dug and soon solved the puzzle: the temple had been built by Merneptah or Merenptah, the son and successor of Ramesses II, almost entirely from stone which had been plundered from the temple of Amenophis III nearby. Statues of the latter had been smashed and the pieces thrown into the foundations; fragments of couchant stone jackals, which must have once formed an imposing avenue approaching the pylon, and broken drums gave some idea of the splendour of the original temple. A statue of Merneptah himself was found—the first known portrait of this king....Better was to follow: two splendid stelae were found, both of them usurped on the reverse side by Merneptah, who had turned them face to the wall. One, beautifully carved, showed Amenophis III in battle with Nubians and Syrians; the other, of black granite, was over ten feet high, larger than any stela previously known; the original text commemorated the building achievements of Amenophis and described the beauties and magnificence of the temple in which it had stood. When it could be turned over, an inscription of Merneptah was revealed, recording his triumphs over the Libyans and the Peoples of the Sea; [Wilhelm] Spiegelberg [a noted German philologist] came over to read it, and near the end of the text he was puzzled by one name, that of a people or tribe whom Merenptah had victoriously smitten-"I.si.ri.ar?" It was Petrie whose quick imaginative mind leapt to the solution: "Israel!" Spiegelberg agreed that it must be so. "Won't the reverends be pleased?" was his comment. At dinner that evening Petrie prophesied: "This stele will be better known in the world than anything else I have found." It was the first mention of the word "Israel" in any Egyptian text and the news made headlines when it reached the English papers.

During the field season of 1895/6, at the Ramesseum, Petrie and the young German Egyptologist Wilhelm Spiegelberg became friends. Spiegelberg was in charge of the edition of many texts discovered by his British colleague, and Petrie offered important collections of artefacts to the University of Strasbourg. In 1897, the Kaiser-Wilhelms-Universität Straßburg gratefully conferred to Petrie the title of doctor honoris causa, and in June 1902 he was elected a Fellow of the Royal Society (FRS). He was elected to the American Philosophical Society in 1905.

=== Hu and Abadiya cemeteries ===
From 1889 to 1899, Petrie directed a team excavating over 17 cemeteries containing numerous graves between Hu and Abadiya, Egypt. The dig team included Beatrice Orme, David Randall-MacIver, Arthur Cruttenden Mace, Henrietta Lawes and Hilda Petrie. Predynastic, Old Kingdom, Middle Kingdom and Roman graves were excavated and published at 'Diospolis Parva'.

== Discovery of the Proto-Sinaitic script ==
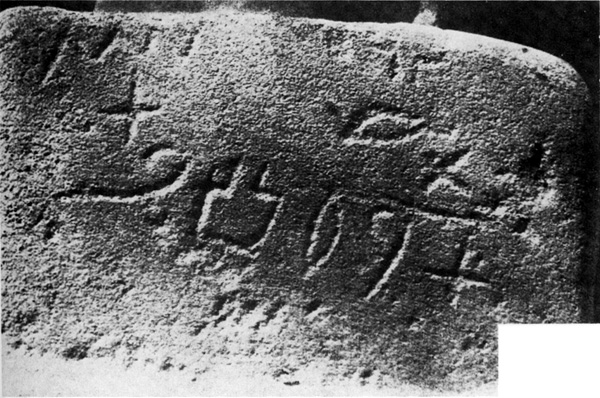
A specimen of Proto-Sinaitic script containing a phrase which may mean 'to Baalat'. The line running from the upper left to lower right reads mt l b^{c}lt.

In the winter of 1904-5, Petrie and his team (among which we find Currelly, Capitain Weill, Lieutenant Frost, Miss Eckenstein) were conducting a series of archaeological studies in the Sinai Peninsula centered around the site of Serabit el-Khadim, a lucrative turquoise mine used during the Twelfth and Thirteenth Dynasty and again between the Eighteenth and mid-Twentieth Dynasty. As they were thoroughly exploring and studying the temple of Hathor and the surrounding mining area, they discovered amongst, the Egyptian texts, a significant series of foreign inscriptions. Having been joined by his wife Hilda, herself also an egyptologist, Petrie realized the script was wholly alphabetic and not the combination of logograms and syllabics characteristic of Egyptian script proper. He thus assumed that the script showed a script that the turquoise miners had devised themselves, using linear signs that they had borrowed from hieroglyphics. He published his findings in London the following year. He had discovered and correctly identified the character of the Proto-Sinaitic script, the ancestor of almost all alphabetic scripts.

== Later life ==
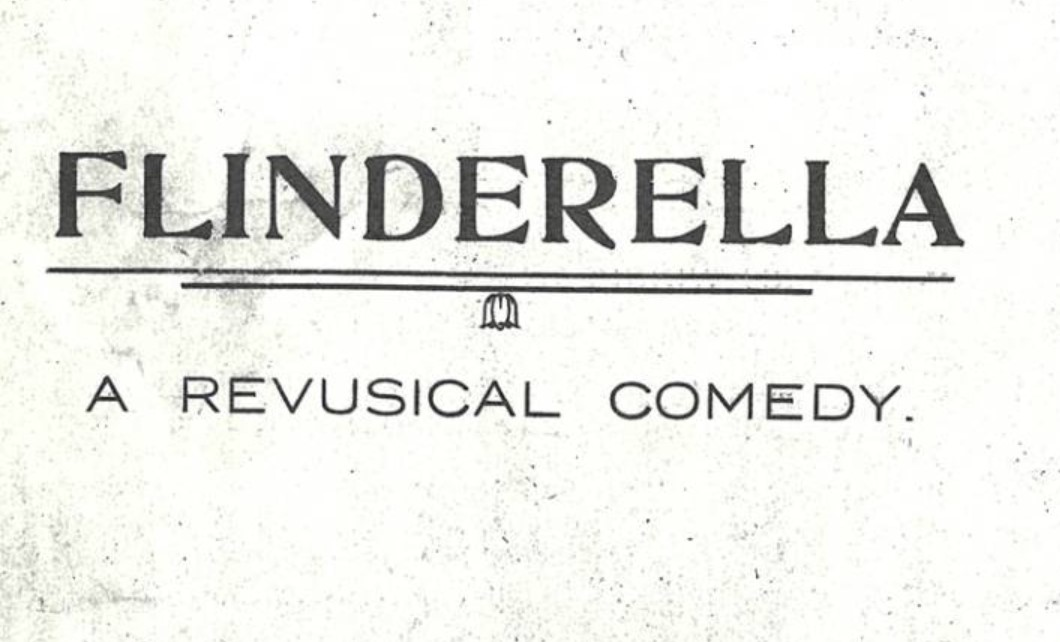
A second performance was given on 25 April 2024.

In the 1923 Birthday Honours, Petrie was knighted for services to British Archaeology and Egyptology. Students of UCL commemorated the investiture by writing and performing a musical play. A hundred years later, the questions had changed: "Between investigations on eugenics, decolonial practice, and calls for repatriation, what has become of Flinderella?"

=== Palestine: Jemmeh and Ajjul ===
The focus of his work shifted permanently to Palestine in 1926. From 1927 until 1938, he excavated in Palestine under the auspices of the American School of Research. he discovered ruins of ten cities in Tell el-Hesi. He began excavating several important sites in the south-west of Palestine, including Tell Jemmeh and Tell el-Ajjul.

=== Luxor and the novel excavation system ===
In parallel with his work in Palestine, Petrie became interested in early Egypt. In 1928, while digging a cemetery at Luxor, this proved so huge that he devised an entirely new excavation system, including comparison charts for finds, which is still used today.

=== Move to Jerusalem ===
In 1933, on retiring from his professorship, he moved permanently to Jerusalem, where he lived with Lady Petrie at the British School of Archaeology, then temporarily headquartered at the American School of Oriental Research (today the W. F. Albright Institute of Archaeological Research).

== Death and preservation of head ==
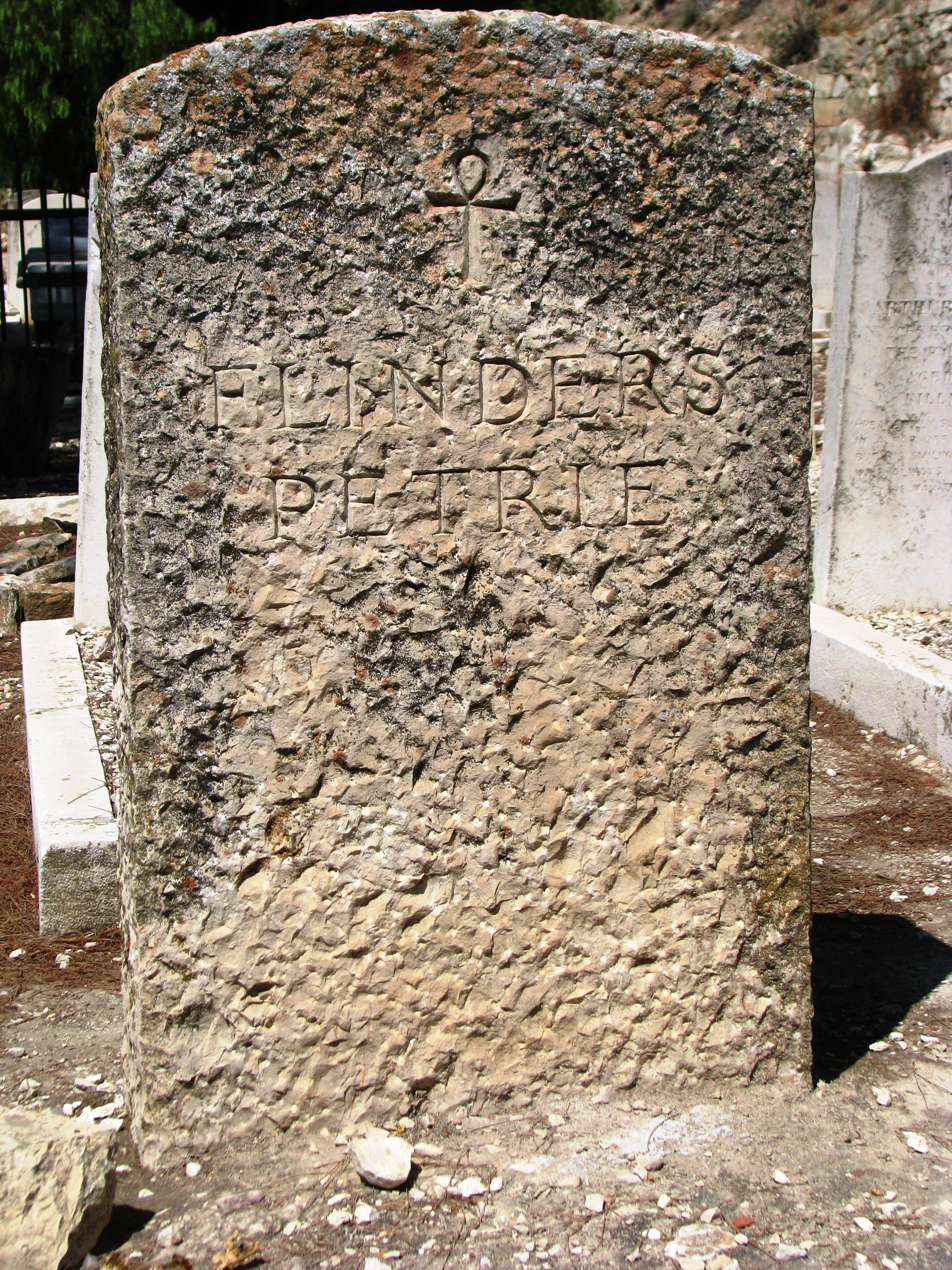
Petrie's headstone in the Protestant Cemetery, Jerusalem (2009)

Flinders Petrie died in Jerusalem on 29 July 1942. (The date is sometimes given as 28th, but Margaret Drower's biography says Lady Petrie sent a telegram to their daughter on 28th saying "Father weaker". The following day, she went to the hospital and was with him when he died that evening.)

His body was interred in the Protestant Cemetery on Mount Zion, but he donated his head (and thus his brain) to the Royal College of Surgeons of London. World War II was then at its height, and the head was delayed in transit. After being stored in a jar in the college basement, its label fell off and no one knew to whom the head belonged. However, it was eventually identified, and is now stored, but not displayed, at the Royal College of Surgeons.

There is a popular legend that Hilda brought back her husband's head in a hat box from Jerusalem after the war. But letters in the Petrie Museum archive illustrate that this legend is not true.

== Personal life ==
Petrie married Hilda Urlin (1871–1957) in London on 26 November 1896. The couple had two children, John (1907–1972) and Ann (1909–1989). The family originally lived in Hampstead, London, where an English Heritage blue plaque has been placed on the building in which they lived at 5 Cannon Place. John Flinders Petrie became a noted mathematician, who gave his name to the Petrie polygon.

== Legacy ==
=== Scientific excavation methods ===
Flinders Petrie's painstaking recording and study of artefacts set new standards in archaeology. He wrote: "I believe the true line of research lies in the noting and comparison of the smallest details."

=== Relative dating through pottery ===
By linking styles of pottery with periods, he was the first to use seriation in Egyptology, a new method for establishing the chronology of a site. Regarding the pre-Dynastic period in Egypt, Petrie used the following numbering method, to be compared with the modern classification:

- Naqada I (Amratian)= Petrie Sequence Dates SD 31–37
- Naqada II (Gerzean) = SD 38–62
- Naqada III (Semainean) = SD 63–76

=== Teacher and mentor ===
Petrie was also responsible for mentoring and training a whole generation of Egyptologists, including Howard Carter, who discovered the tomb of Tutankhamun. On the centennial of Petrie's birth in 1953, his widow Hilda Petrie created a student travel scholarship to Egypt.

=== Egypt findings ===
Many thousands of artefacts recovered during excavations led by Petrie can be found in museums worldwide.

=== Petrie Medal for archaeology ===
The Petrie Medal was created in celebration of Petrie's seventieth birthday, when funds were raised to commission and produce 20 medals to be awarded "once in every three years for distinguished work in Archaeology, preferably to a British subject". The first medal was awarded to Petrie himself (1925), and the first few recipients included Sir Aurel Stein (1928), Sir Arthur Evans (1931), Abbé Henri Breuil (1934), J.D. Beazley (1937), Sir Mortimer Wheeler (1950), Alan Wace (1953), and Sir Leonard Woolley (1957).

=== Racist views ===
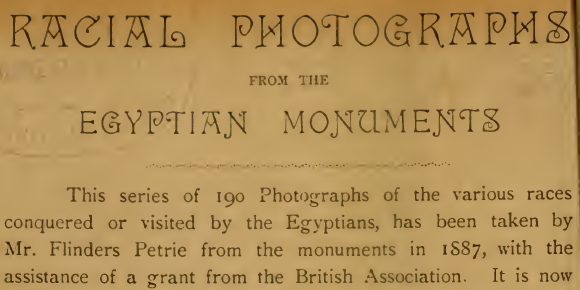

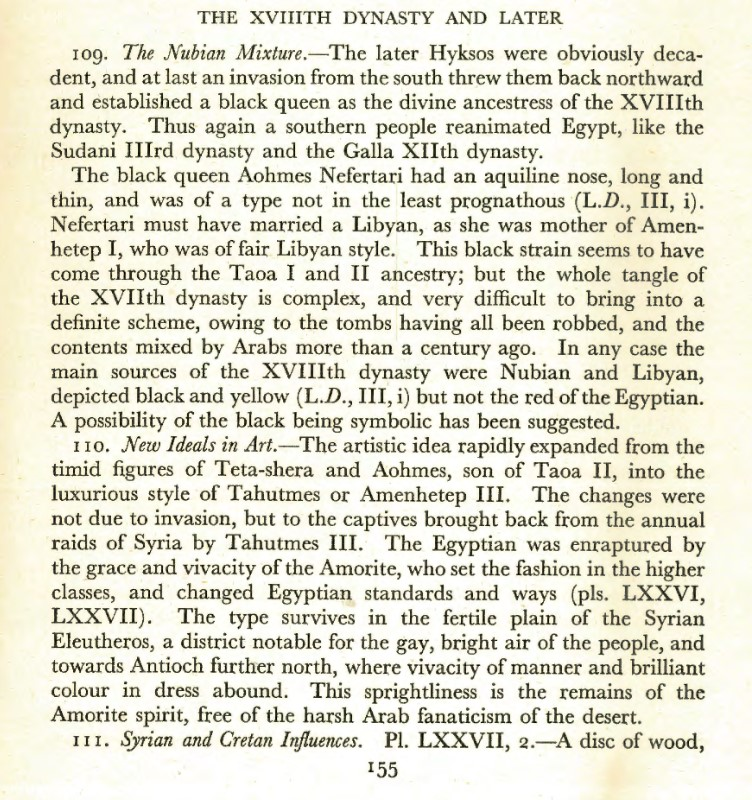

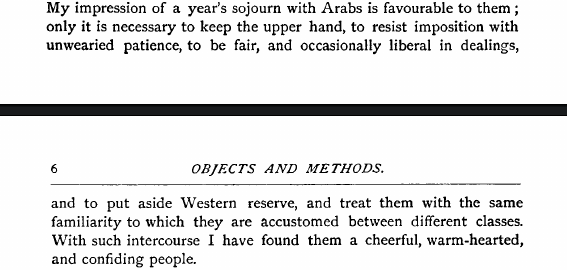
"The Pyramids and Temples of Gizeh"

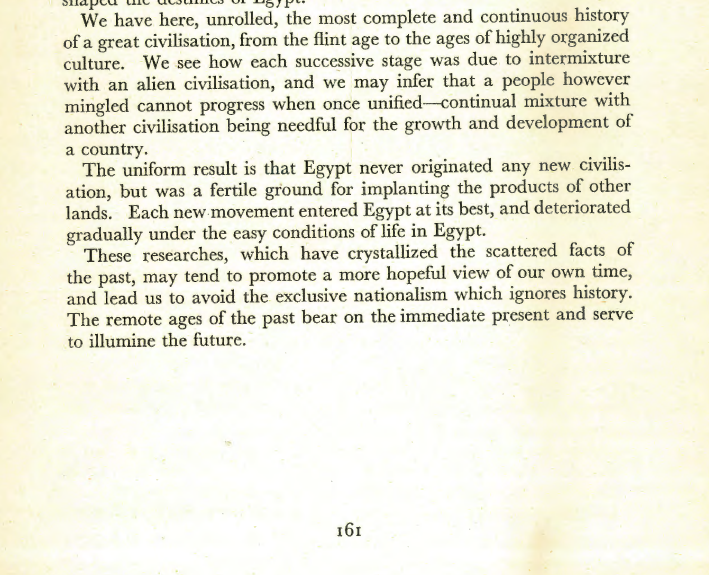
In "The Making of Egypt," Petrie pushes pseudoscience but praises diversity.

Petrie remains controversial for his pro-eugenics and racist views, and was a dedicated believer in the superiority of the Northern peoples over the Latinate and Southern peoples. In his 1906 sociological series "Question of the day", he expressed these views, ascribing social problems of England to racial degeneration brought on by communism, trade unionism, and government assistance to people groups he found inferior. His racist views spilled over into his academic opinions. Believing that society is the product of racial biology, he contended that the culture of Ancient Egypt was derived from an invading Caucasoid "Dynastic Race", which had entered Egypt from the south in late predynastic times, conquered the "inferior, exhausted mulatto" natives, and slowly introduced the higher Dynastic civilisation as it interbred with them. With relation to some of his earlier conclusions in 1895, where Petrie had written: "the Egyptians were largely formed from Libyan immigrants to begin with; the basis of the race apparently being a mulatto of Libyan-negro mixture judging from the earliest skeletons at Medum." Petrie also engaged in fierce controversies with the British Museum's Egyptology expert E. A. Wallis Budge, who contended that the religion of the Egyptians was not introduced by invaders, but was essentially identical to that of the people of northeastern and central Africa; however, most of their colleagues judged Petrie's opinion to be more scientific.

=== Palestinian archaeology ===
His involvement in Palestinian archaeology was examined in the exhibition "A Future for the Past: Petrie's Palestinian Collection".

=== Memorial ===
In August 2012, more than a hundred people gathered at Petrie's grave, to commemorate the 70th anniversary of his death. His headstone is marked only with his name and an ankh symbol, the Egyptian hieroglyph for "life".

== Published work ==
A number of Petrie's discoveries were presented to the Royal Archaeological Society and described in the society's Archaeological Journal by his good friend and fellow archaeologist Flaxman Charles John Spurrell. Petrie published a total of 97 books.

- Tel el-Hesy (Lachish). London: Palestine Exploration Fund.
- "The Tomb-Cutter's Cubits at Jerusalem," Palestine Exploration Fund Quarterly, 1892 Vol. 24: 24–35.

=== Contributions to the Encyclopædia Britannica, 11th ed. ===
- "Abydos (Egypt)". Encyclopædia Britannica (11th ed.). 1911.
- "Egypt". Encyclopædia Britannica (11th ed.). 1911.
- "Pyramid". Encyclopædia Britannica (11th ed.). 1911.
- "Weights and Measures". Encyclopædia Britannica (11th ed.). 1911.

=== Selected works ===
- Naukratis, Pt. I, Egypt Exploration Fund, 1886
- Tanis, Pt. I, Egypt Exploration Fund, 1889
- Egyptian decorative art, London, 1895
- Naqada and Ballas, 1895
- The Royal Tombs of the First Dynasty, 1900–1901
- The Religion of Ancient Egypt (1906)
- Migrations, Anthropological Inst. of Great Britain and Ireland, 1906.
- Janus in Modern Life, G. P. Putnam's Sons, 1907.
- "Neglected British History". Proceedings of the British Academy, 1917–1918. 8: 251–278. November 1917.
- Eastern Exploration – Past and Future London: Constable and Company Ltd., 1918.
- Some Sources of Human History, Society for Promoting Christian Knowledge, 1919.
- The Status of the Jews in Egypt, G. Allen & Unwin, 1922.
- The Revolutions of Civilization, Harper & Brothers, 1922.
- Gaza I–V, to up 1931
- The Making of Egypt, 1939

=== Bibliographies ===
- A Bibliography of Sir William Matthew Flinders Petrie JANE, 1972

== Collections ==
In addition to Petrie's collection in the museum named after him, University College London Special Collections holds correspondence between Petrie and John Sebelien, and Petrie to Ernest Arthur Gardner.

== Gallery ==
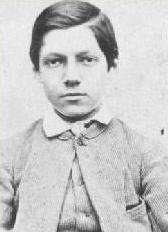
Flinders Petrie, 12 years old, c. 1865.

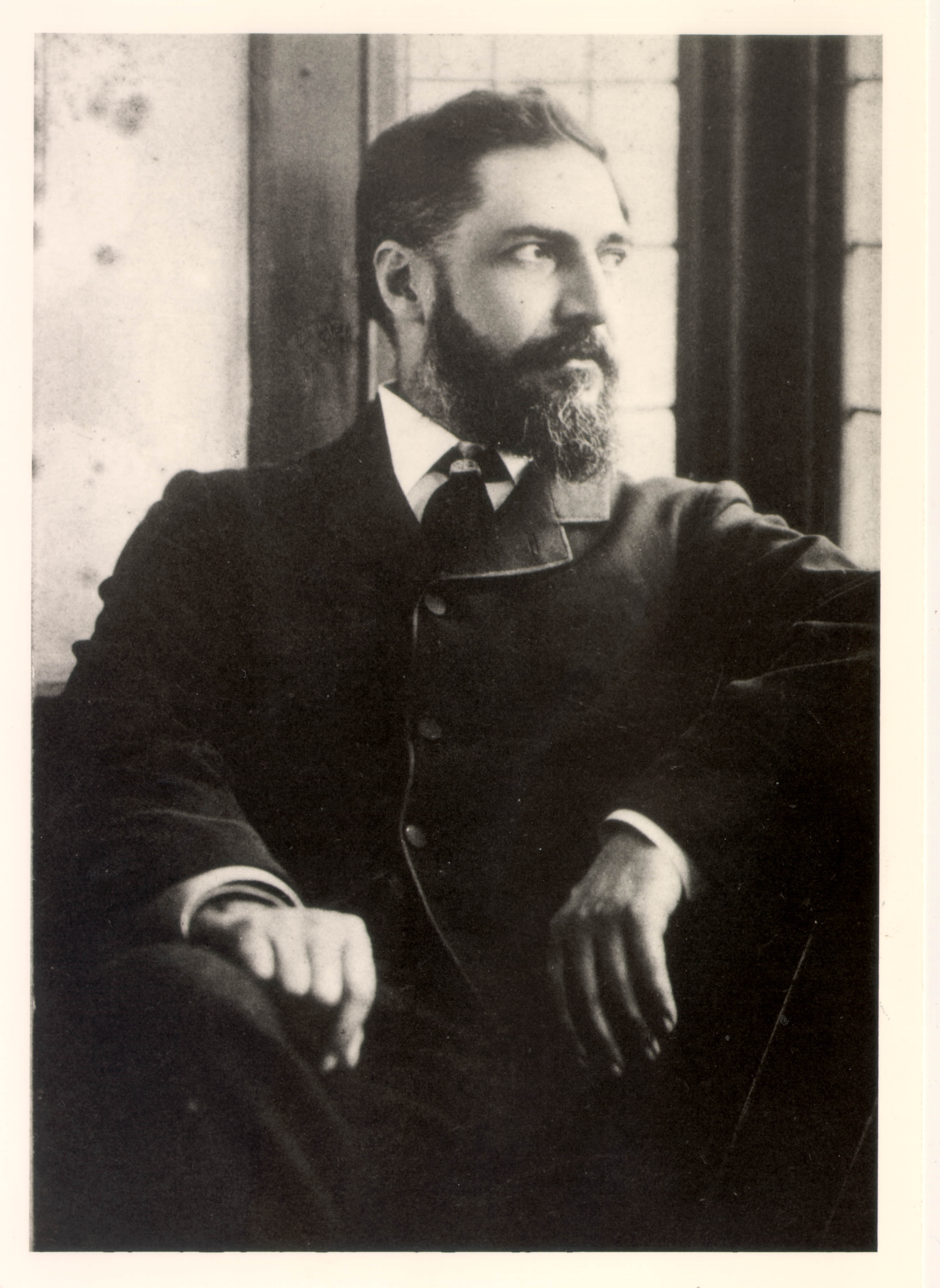
Flinders Petrie, as a young man, n.d.

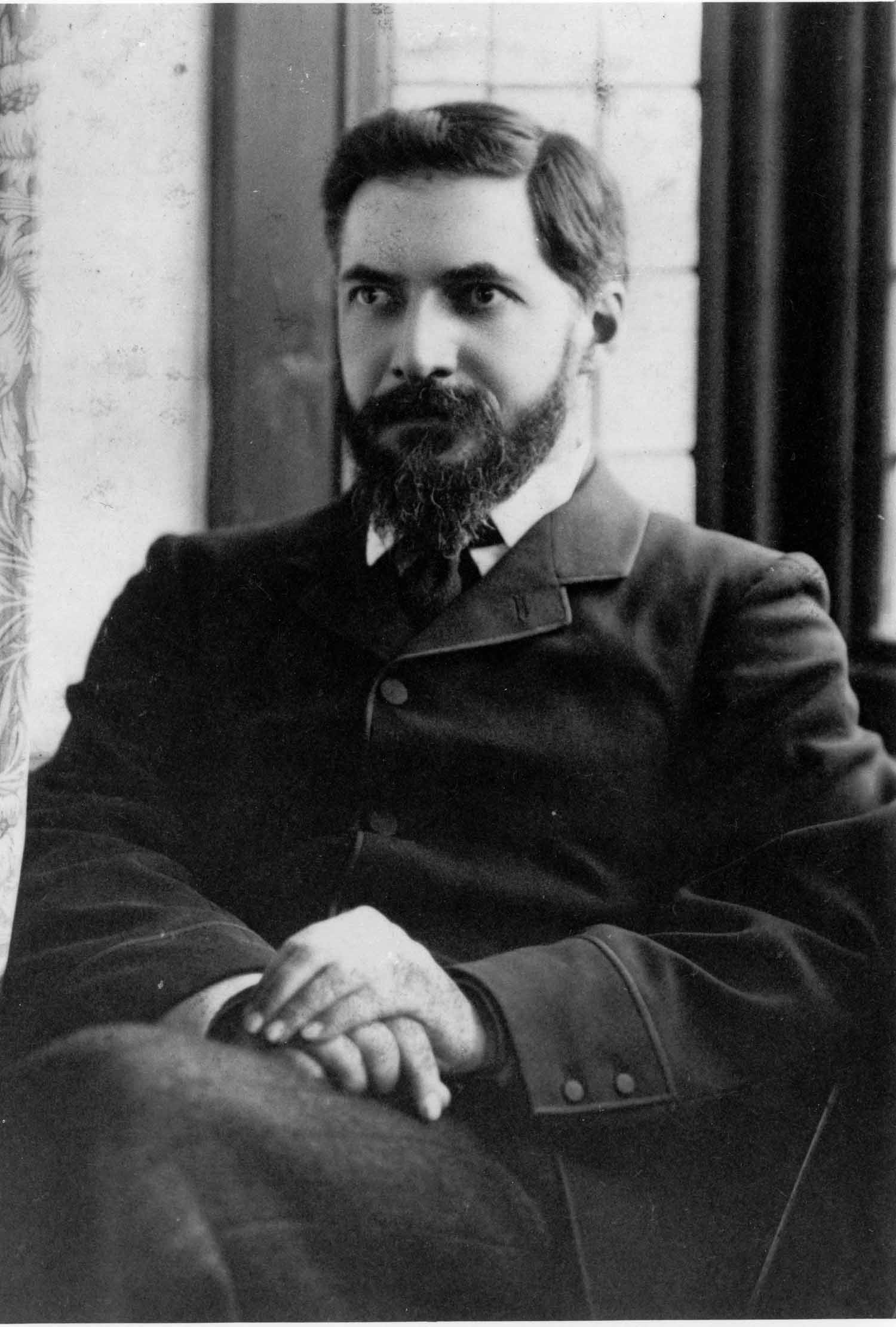
Flinders Petrie, c. 1886.

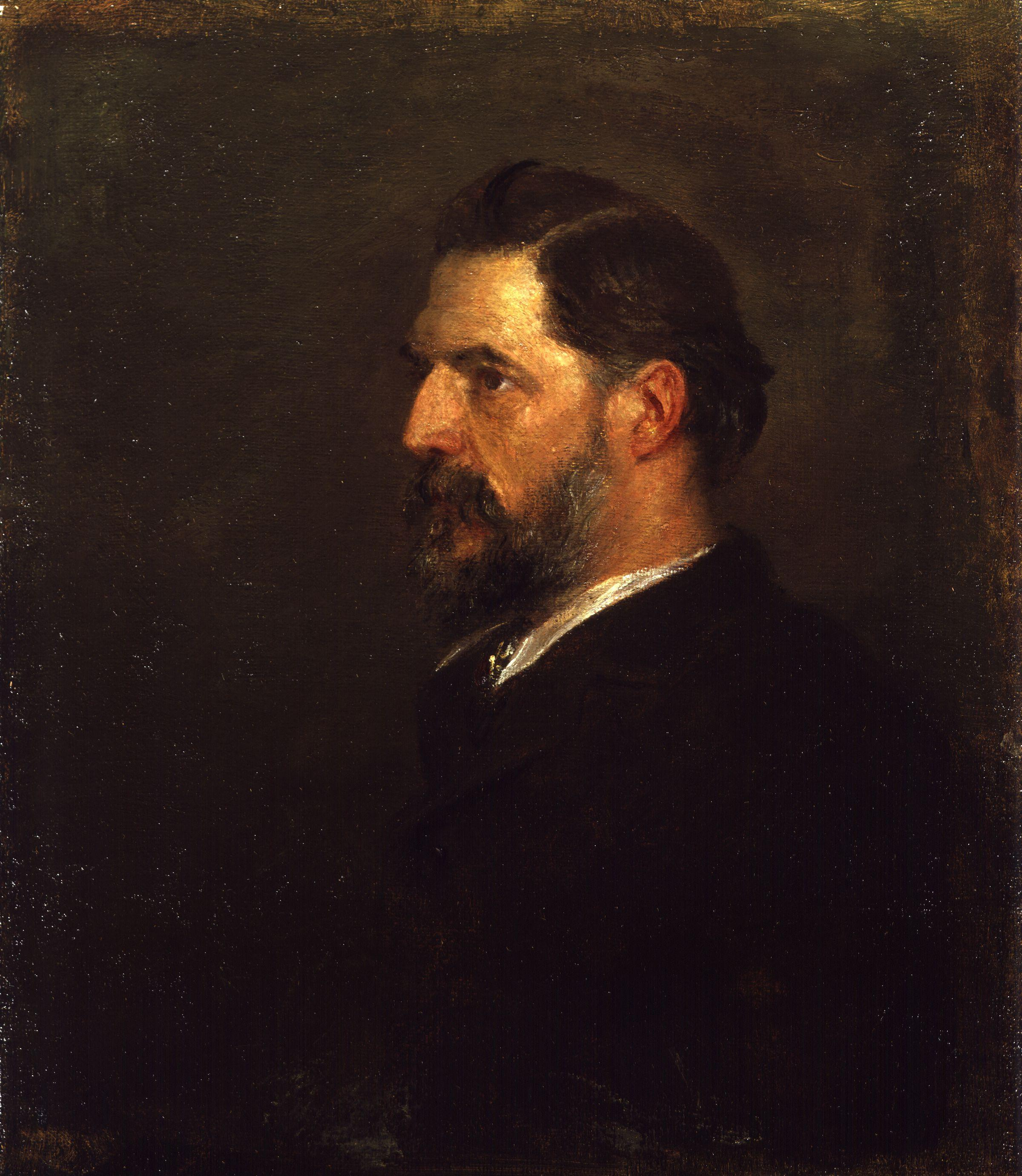
Flinders Petrie, by George Frederic Watts, 1900.

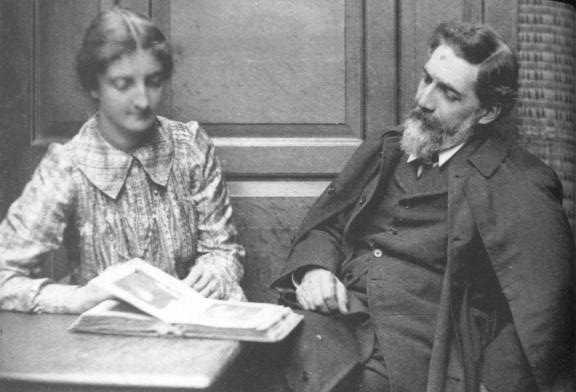
Flinders Petrie and Hilda Petrie in 1903.

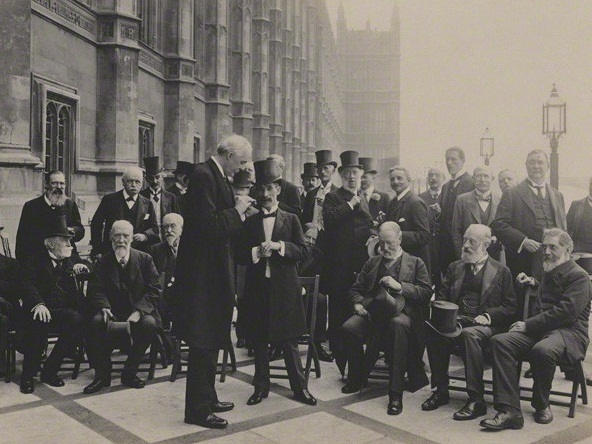
Flinders Petrie, Luncheon Party at the House of Commons, 1908.

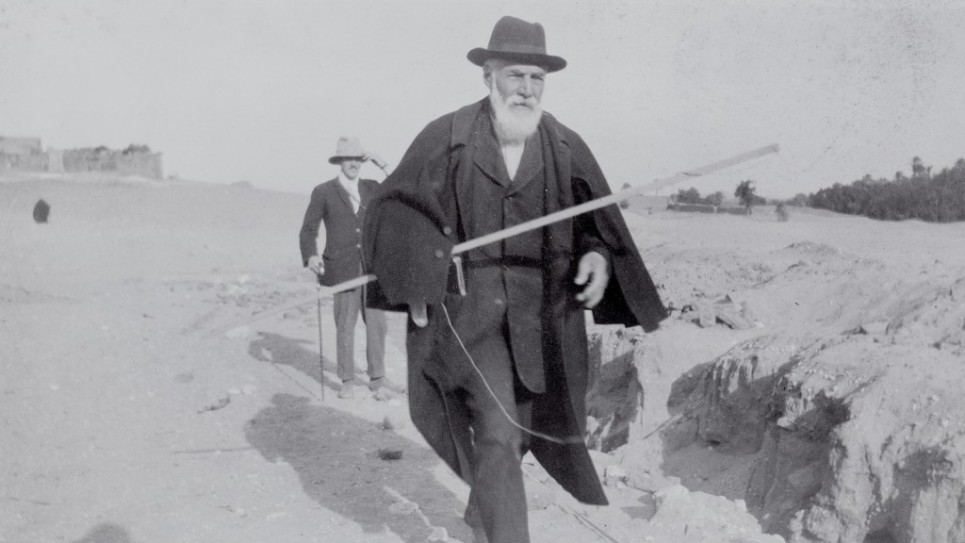
Petrie at Abydos, Egypt, 1922.

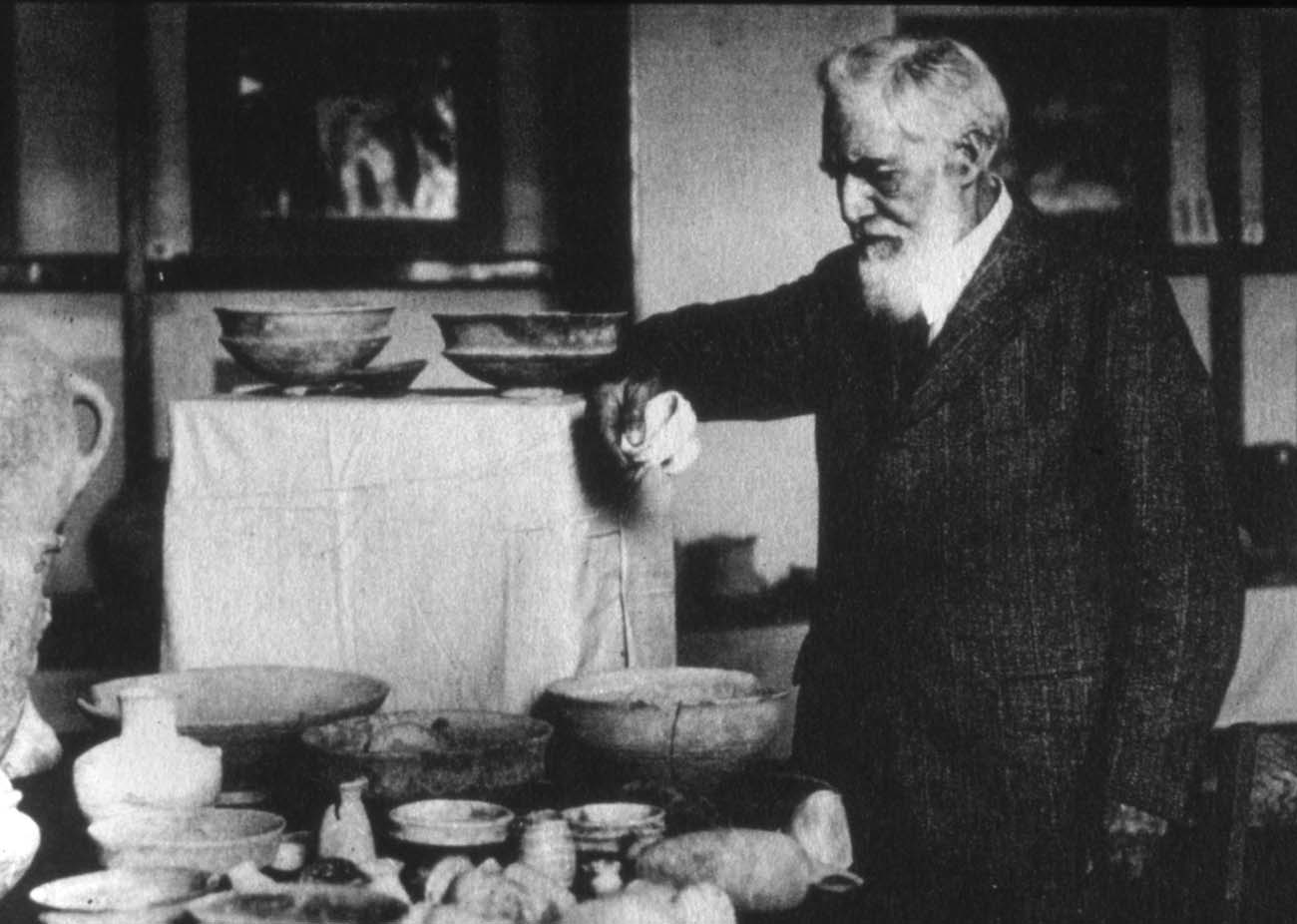
Petrie Exhibiting Material from Tell Fara in London.

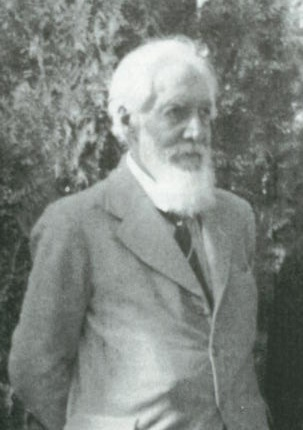
Sir William Matthew Flinders Petrie, in Jerusalem, ca. late 1930s.

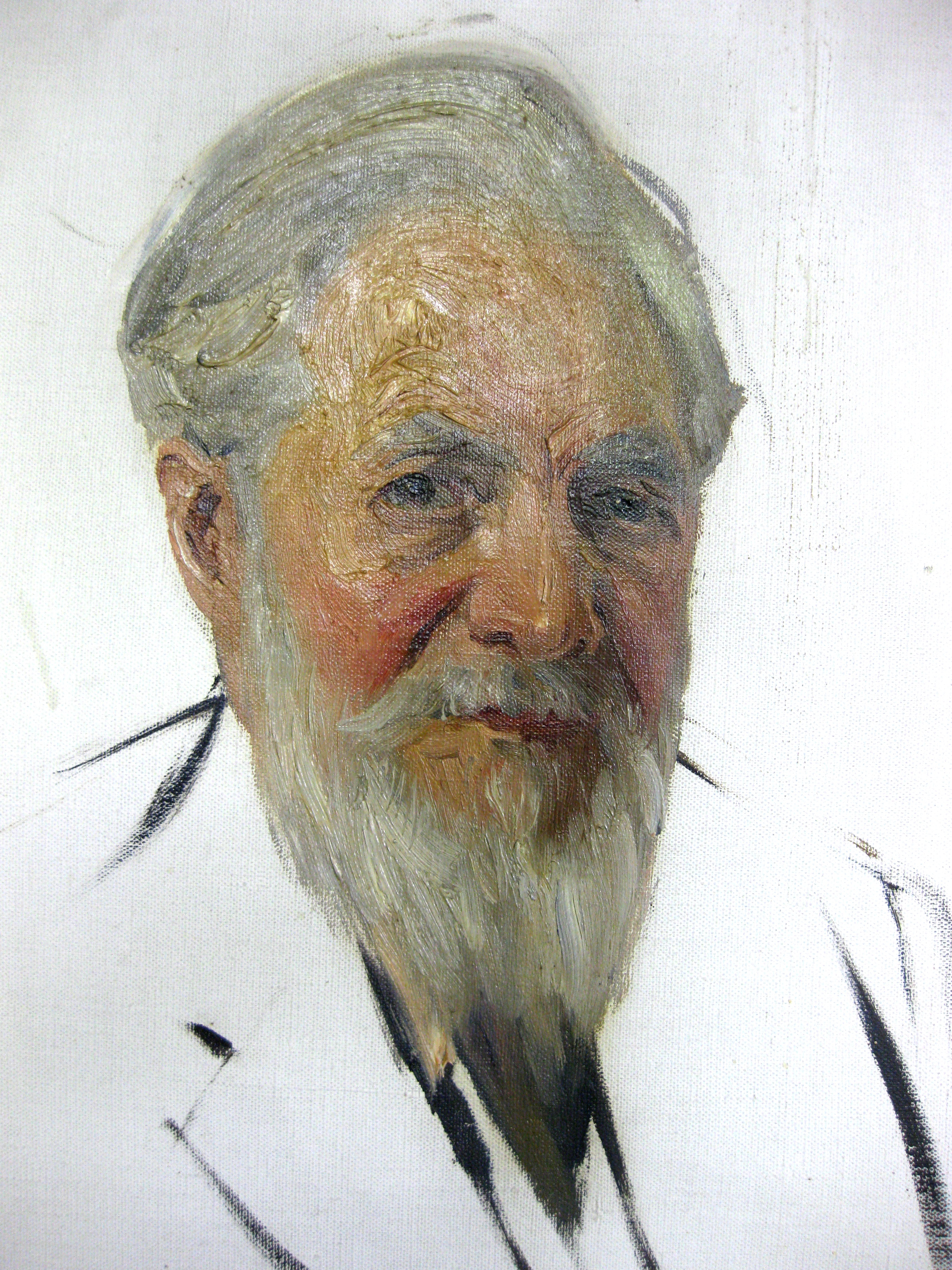
Flinders Petrie, by Ludwig Blum. Painted in Jerusalem in 1937.
