= Henrietta Lawes =

British artist and archaeologist (1861–1947)

Henrietta 'Hetty' Lawes
- Born: October 1861; Sindlesham, Berkshire
- Died: 11 March 1947 (aged 85); Wokingham, Berkshire
- Occupations: Artist and archaeologist
- Organization(s): University of Reading, Reading Museum
- Known for: Assisting with Hu excavations with Egyptologists Hilda and Flinders Petrie.

Henrietta 'Hetty' Lawes (October 1861 - March 1947) was a British artist and archaeologist, best known for illustrating Egyptian artefacts and assisting with the excavations at Hu, Egypt, led by Egyptologists Hilda Petrie and Flinders Petrie in 1899.

Lawes later bequeathed numerous Egyptian artefacts and books about Egypt to the Ure Museum of Greek Archaeology at the University of Reading, and Reading Museum.

Her first cousin was the suffragette and women's rights activist, Emmeline Pethick-Lawrence.

== Early life ==
Henrietta Lawes was born in October 1861 in Sindlesham, Berkshire. Her father was Joseph Lawes (1829-1902), the owner of Caversham Mill. Lawes' first cousin on her mother's side was Emmeline Pethick-Lawrence. Lawes' sister, Jessie, was a suffragette who was later arrested on a deputation to Parliament in June 1909, along with her cousin Emmeline.

== Art studies ==
Lawes studied art as a mature student at the Reading School of Art on Valpy Street, from 1890. She gained her Art Master's Certificate in 1897, and was awarded a prize for her artwork at the University of Reading Extension College. She was the treasurer of University College Reading's 'Vacations Sketching Club', and later the 'Talbot Art Club'.

== Egypt expedition ==
Between November 1898 - March 1899, Lawes worked on the Hu excavation in Egypt, with Hilda and Flinders Petrie. Along with archaeologist Beatrice Orme, she assisted with excavations and drew pottery. Flinders noted that:

Miss Orme & Miss Lawes mark pots & skeletons & look after the things. So our part of seven goes on very smoothly so far.

Lawes' catalogued finds were displayed at University College London after the expedition.

== Later life ==
In the 1900s, Lawes continued with her artwork as part of the Berkshire Art Society, displaying works at Reading Museum and Art Gallery in 1901 and 1902. One work in particular, 'Market Day at Nagh Hamadeh', was particularly well-received by the public. In 1904, she returned to Egypt with her cousin Emmeline. During the 1920s, she lived in Tilehurst, Berkshire, with her sister Jessie. Lawes was part of the Berkshire Archaeological Society. Lawes died on 11 March 1947, whilst living at The Cedars, Wokingham. She bequeathed numerous antiquities to the Ure Museum at Reading University, and to Reading Museum. She left effects of £4300 8s 1d, to her nephew Charles Cecil Lawes, a retired farmer, and Edwin George Carter, General Manager of the Thames Valley Trustee Savings Bank.
