= Johnson Matthey Technology Review =

- Discipline: Platinum group metals
- Language: English
- Edited by: Jonathan J. Butler

Publication details
- Former name: Platinum Metals Review
- History: 1957–present
- Publisher: Johnson Matthey Plc
- Frequency: Quarterly
- Open access: Yes
- Impact factor: 1.296 (2018)

Standard abbreviations
- ISO 4: Johnson Matthey Technol. Rev.

Indexing
- Johnson Matthey Technology Review
- CODEN: JMTRAP
- ISSN: 2056-5135
- Platinum Metals Review
- CODEN: PTMRA3
- ISSN: 0032-1400 (print); 1471-0676 (web)
- LCCN: 59037460
- OCLC no.: 45130790

Links
- Journal homepage; Online access; Online archives; Ingentaconnect open access issues

Johnson Matthey Technology Review, known as Platinum Metals Review before 2014, is a quarterly, open access, peer-reviewed scientific journal publishing reports on scientific research on the platinum group metals and related industrial developments.

== History ==
The journal was established in 1957 under the name Platinum Metals Review and was published by Johnson Matthey and Co., with the support of the Rustenburg Platinum Mines. This was done in the hopes of increasing the availability of information on the properties of Platinum and to link both academic and industrial research with "the aims of finding practical solutions to the material problems of modern technology (McDonald/Hunt)". From the July 2004 issue onward, it was published in electronic format only. In 2014 the journal was relaunched as Johnson Matthey Technology Review.

== Aims and scope ==
The journal included reviews of research, books, and academic conferences, as well as primary results in the form of brief reports. It also reviewed what it considered to be notable aspects of patents and relevant scientific literature. Occasionally articles on the history, geological occurrences, and exploitation of platinum group metals were also published.

While between 2016 and October 2022 the journals content was published as CC BY-NC-ND 4.0, the journal is now published under CC-BY 4.0 from January 2023 onward, in accordance with the definition of open access given by the Budapest Open Access Initiative.

== Abstracting and indexing ==
Currently, Johnson Matthey Technology Review was abstracted and indexed by:

- Chemical Abstracts Service
- CAS SciFinder
- Web of Science
- Science Citation Index Expanded
- Journal Citation Reports
- ProQuest Current Contents
- ProQuest SciSearch
- SciTech Premium Collection
- Technology Research Database
- Scopus
- CNKI
- EBSCO

While it was still known as Platinum Metals Review, it was abstracted and indexed by:

- Chemical Abstracts Service
- Chemical Engineering and Biotechnology Abstracts
- Compendex
- Corrosion Abstracts
- Current Contents/Physical, Chemical & Earth Sciences
- Environment Abstracts
- Metals Abstracts/METADEX
- Metal Finishing Abstracts
- Science Citation Index Expanded
- Scopus
- World Textile Abstracts
