= Percival Norton Johnson =

British industrialist (1792–1866)

Percival Norton Johnson (1792–1866) was the founder of Johnson Matthey, the United Kingdom's largest precious metals business.

== Career ==
Having trained in his father's business as an assayer, Percival Johnson established his own firm in 1817. He specialised in the assaying and refining of precious metals particularly gold imported from Brazil: he perfected a method of extracting the Palladium from the gold therefore improving the gold's colour. He became a Fellow of the Royal Society in 1846. He went into full partnership with George Matthey, a former apprentice, in 1851. His expertise in refining earned his business the appointment of Assayer to the Bank of England in 1852.

He was also active in silver-mining and in 1854 moved to Stoke Fleming in Devon where he had mining interests. He retired in 1860 and died in 1866.

== Family ==
He married Elizabeth Lydia Smith in 1817: they had no children. He married a second time, to Georgina Elizabeth Ellis, in 1858.
