= George Matthey =

George Matthey (1825–1913) was an English metallurgist, known for work on the refining of platinum. He became a partner in the metals firm Johnson & Matthey in 1851, and was elected a Fellow of the Royal Society in 1879.

== Early life and background ==
He was born on 8 May 1825, a younger (third or fourth son) of John Matthey and his wife Elizabeth Green; his grandfather Simon Matthey was Swiss, from Le Locle, an immigrant to Great Britain around 1790. A Simon Matthey of 21 Artillery Place, Finsbury Square, has a directory entry in 1814 as a merchant, and died in 1815 aged 73; at the same address, in 1817, John Matthey is in business as a merchant. George Matthey's father John was a stockbroker and dealer in foreign exchange.

Matthey was educated at a school described as Arragon House, Twickenham, possibly at Aragon House, 247 New King's Road, Parsons Green where there was a school of that name from the early 19th century. He was taught there by a Mr. Sandor.

== Platinum metallurgist ==
Matthey was taken on as a teenaged apprentice by Percival Norton Johnson at his Hatton Garden precious metals business in London; Johnson and John Matthey were on good terms, and George's apprenticeship, with a chance at the firm also for his brother Edward, were in return for capital investment. George Matthew initially worked on assays, under William John Cock (1813–1892). He moved to platinum production in 1845, when Cock retired for health reasons.

In 1850/1 Matthew made a key deal for platinum ore with Anatoly Demidov, 1st Prince of San Donato, from a mine in the Urals. Up to that point the sole commercial source had been from the Chocó Department in Colombia. This business success gained Matthew a partnership with Johnson.

At the 1855 Paris Exposition, Johnson & Matthey exhibited a platinum boiler developed with William Petrie. While there, Matthey and Cock met Paul François Morin, a French chemist, industrialist and politician; and through Morin contacted Henri Étienne Sainte-Claire Deville and Jules Henri Debray. In 1857 Johnson & Matthey took up a patent on a furnace design by Deville and Debray for platinum refining, using an oxygen and coal gas mixture.

== Johnson, Matthey & Co. ==
Johnson retired in 1860, and the Hatton Garden business was carried on by the partnership of George Matthey, his brother Edward who had entered the firm in 1850, and John Sellon. In 1891, the partnership, now of four members of the Matthey family and two of the Sellon family, was dissolved, and replaced by Johnson, Matthey and Co. Limited; George Matthey was the initial chairman of the limited company.

== Physical standards ==
From 1874, Matthey assisted Deville in the development of the international prototype metre, cast in a platinum-iridium alloy. The manufacture of the initial International Prototype of the Kilogram is credited to Matthey and Ambroise Barbe Alfred Collot (1827–1900), a French maker of precision instruments.

== Residences ==
Matthey had Cheyne House at 18 Cheyne Walk built to a design by Norman Shaw in 1875–7. He also had a house Rosemount in Eastbourne, on which Shaw worked 1880–1.

== Family ==
Matthey married in 1853 Charlotte Ann Davies. Of their children:

- Richard Davies Matthey (1858–1929) went into Johnson & Matthey, and was Assayer to the Royal Mint.
