= William Flockhart =

Scottish chemist (1808–1871)

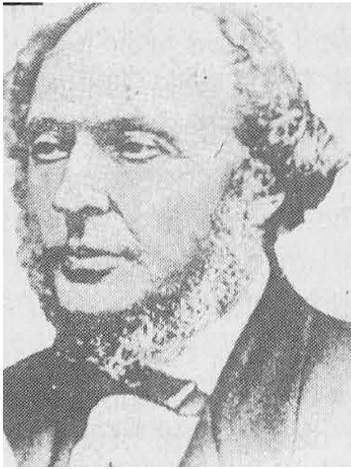
- Born: Annacroich, Kinross-shire
- Baptised: 30 November 1808
- Died: 24 August 1871; Edinburgh
- Resting place: Warriston Cemetery; 58°58'10.9"N, 3°11'47.5"W
- Education: Licenciate of the Royal College of Surgeons Edinburgh
- Occupation: chemist or pharmacist
- Employer(s): founding partner of Duncan, Flockhart and Company
- Known for: supplying chloroform for the first human use to James Young Simpson

William Flockhart, L.R.C.S.E. (1808 – 1871) was a Scottish chemist, a pharmacist who provided chloroform to Doctor (later Sir) James Young Simpson for his anaesthesia experiment at 52 Queen Street, Edinburgh on 4 November 1847. This was the first use of this chemical on humans when Simpson tried it on himself and a few friends, and then used it for pain relief in obstetrics, and surgery. This changed medical practice for over a century, according to the British Medical Journal.

== Career ==
Flockhart had joined John Duncan (also from Kinross-shire, who was 28 years his senior), as a partner in 1833, having started as an apprentice surgeon-apothecary and qualifying as a licenciate of the Royal College of Surgeons Edinburgh in 1830, when he was 22 years old. He did not practise as a surgeon, but with Duncan, worked closely with other doctors in Edinburgh on experimental drugs, which they then refined to improve in purity, following the medical experiments' results. They were both among the nine founder members of the Northern British Branch of the Pharmaceutical Society (in 1841) and joined the Edinburgh Merchant Company. The second annual dinner of the Pharmaceutical Society included a toast 'to strangers present' by Flockhart, and three years later he was elected president. In his inaugural speech he highlighted the issues on unregulated production, of poisons for example, and the risks from a lack of quality controls, and thus he proposed a 'Universal Phamacopoeia for Great Britain'. In December 1861, Flockhart was also elected to the Edinburgh Chamber of Commerce.

Duncan and Flockhart had premises at 52 North Bridge, Edinburgh (now the Balmoral Hotel) which has a plaque to the pharmacists, dedicated in 1981, by the International Association for the Study of Pain.

The retail pharmacy business under Flockhart's management flourished and another branch at 139 Princes Street, Edinburgh opened in 1846. From 1855 to 1865, Flockhart managed the business and it moved to 6 North Bridge. Duncan, Flockhart and Company manufacturing partnership later extended to a factory at 1 Constitution Street, Leith. When Duncan died, Flockhart continued to partner with his son Doctor James Duncan, and the firm extended rapidly and grew its business on the back of the growing demand for chloroform and other drugs or analgesics.

Flockhart died at Annacroich, after sudden onset of severe stomach pains, although medical colleagues came from Edinburgh to his aid, in August 1871, aged 62, and was buried at Warriston Cemetery, Edinburgh, near to where James Young Simpson is also buried. His death announcement appeared in the Stonehaven Journal.

His son (also) William Flockhart took over the business of Duncan, Flockhart and Company Limited with James Duncan and he lived at 4 Gayfield Square, Edinburgh. The chemist company that Duncan and Flockhart had begun continued to operate in various forms in North Bridge, Edinburgh up until 1976, and later merged into large international pharma companies.

== First supply of chloroform for human use ==
That Flockhart supplied Simpson's self-experiment on 4 November 1847, was not the original plan, but his method for ensuring the chemical's purity was still broadly being used in the 1960s. Another name for it, in his time, was a 'perchloride of formyle', which had been planned by Dr. Simpson to come from David Waldie, another Scottish doctor/chemist from Linlithgow, based in Liverpool, but the laboratory suffered a fire. The process of making it could be dangerous; once one of their chloroform retorts exploded but Flockhart and Duncan both wore spectacles, which had protected their eyes.

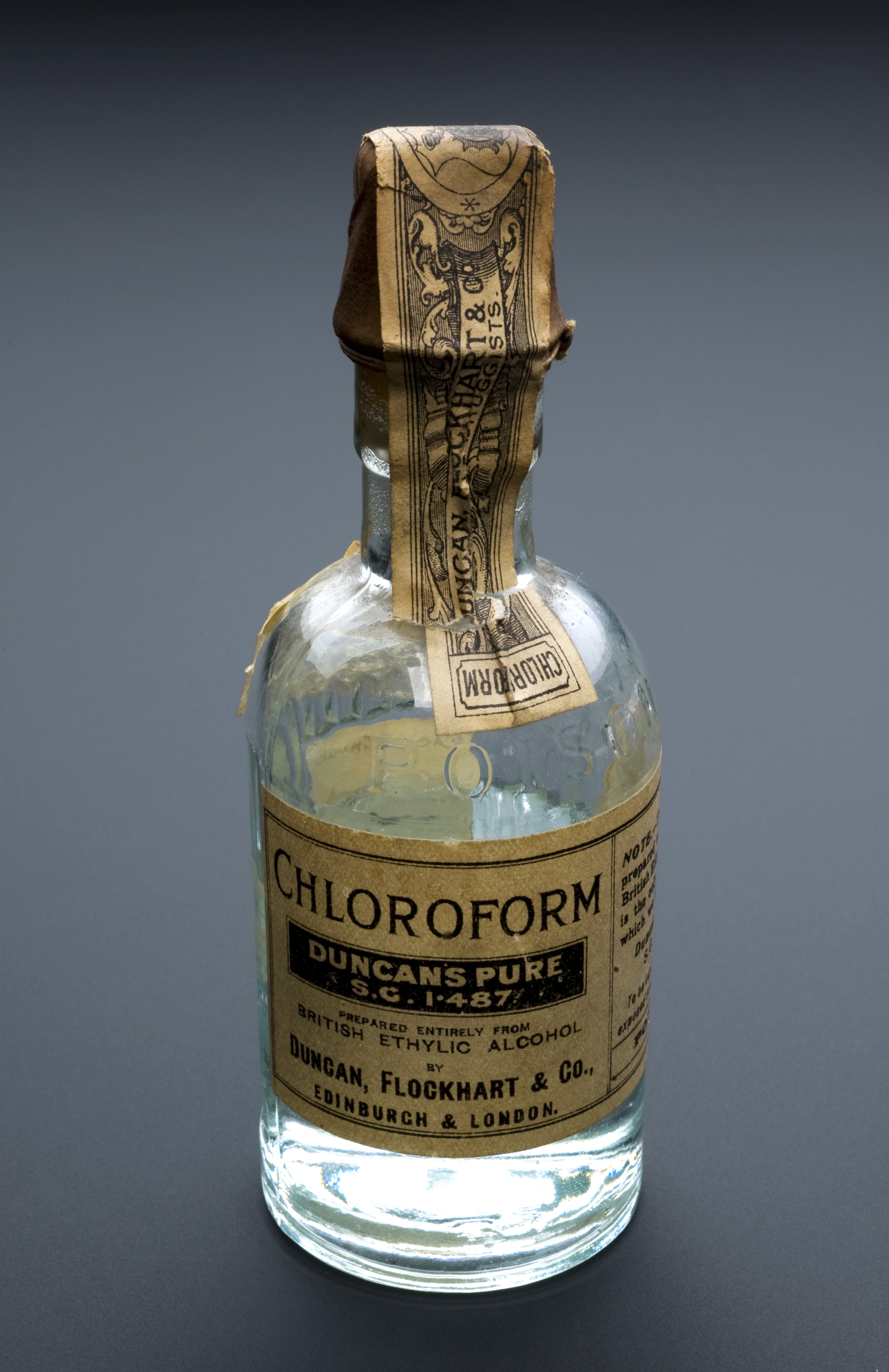
Duncan Flockhart & Co Bottle of chloroform, United Kingdom, 1896-1945 Wellcome L0058271

The circumstances and different opinions on how Flockhart came to supply the surgeon with this drug is discussed in the Pharmaceutical Historian including statements by Simpson's daughter that Flockhart and his partner worked until 2 a.m. to prepare the first perchloride of formyle for her father's trial. The success of the doctor's experiment was communicated widely such that within three months demand was already high for this new anaesthetic and the firm were exporting to England. Flockhart's product was exhibited in the London 1851 Exhibition, and that year Simpson paid Flockhart to supply it to Florence Nightingale. The total sales across the market was estimated as 750,000 doses a week by 1895.

From 1862 to 1875 the partners were Chemists and Druggists in Ordinary to Queen Victoria, supplying to Balmoral Castle, and she used chloroform in childbirth.

The firm extended to London and became the main supplier of chloroform in Britain, including to its armed forces, which continued during both World Wars. Duncan, Flockhart and Company was also used for sourcing reference samples on chloroform quality by drug firms in the United States.

At the 1947 centenary of the chloroform use experiment, the company's contribution and Flockhart's role was noted in the press.

== Family and memorial ==
Flockhart was born at Annacroich, Kinross-shire near Loch Leven, baptised on 30 November 1808, the sixth child of seven, to William Flockhart and his wife Euphemia née Mudie. His brother Robert, a surgeon on the ship 'HMS Brisk' died of fever near Sierra Leone (aged 25); and he had previously worked with Dr Knox of Edinburgh on experiments with writer Walter Scott.

When Flockhart married on 31 October 1860, at the age 52, his wife Jane Henderson was twenty-five years younger (born 1833). They then lived at Seaforth Cottage, 29 York Road, Edinburgh. Three of their children died in infancy, but their first son William born 1861 and daughter Jane Edith outlived their parents.

Flockhart died on 24 August 1871, aged 62 years.

Flockhart's burial site is at 58°58'10.9"N, 3°11'47.5"W in Warriston Cemetery, Edinburgh and has a memorial grey marble or granite obelisk with the inscription on the front plinth (North Face) which reads:

' IN MEMORY OF

WILLIAM FLOCKHART

L.R.C.S.E

OF ANNACROICH KINROSS-SHIRE

CHEMIST IN EDINBURGH

WHO DIED 24TH AUGUST 1871

AGED 62 YEARS

AND

JANE HENDERSON

HIS WIFE

WHO DIED 2ND DECEMBER 1891

AGED 58 YEARS'.

Family memorial

On other faces of the plinth are inscriptions (on West face) in memory of three children who died in infancy: John George (born 1860) died 19 October 1864, aged 23 months; Euphemia died 27 December 1868, aged 3 weeks; Isabella Mary died 6 January 1869 aged 4 years. Children of William and Jane Flockhart. And (on East face - son) William Flockhart of Annacroich died 21 September 1924, aged 63 years and Jane Edith Flockhart his sister died 24 November 1930.

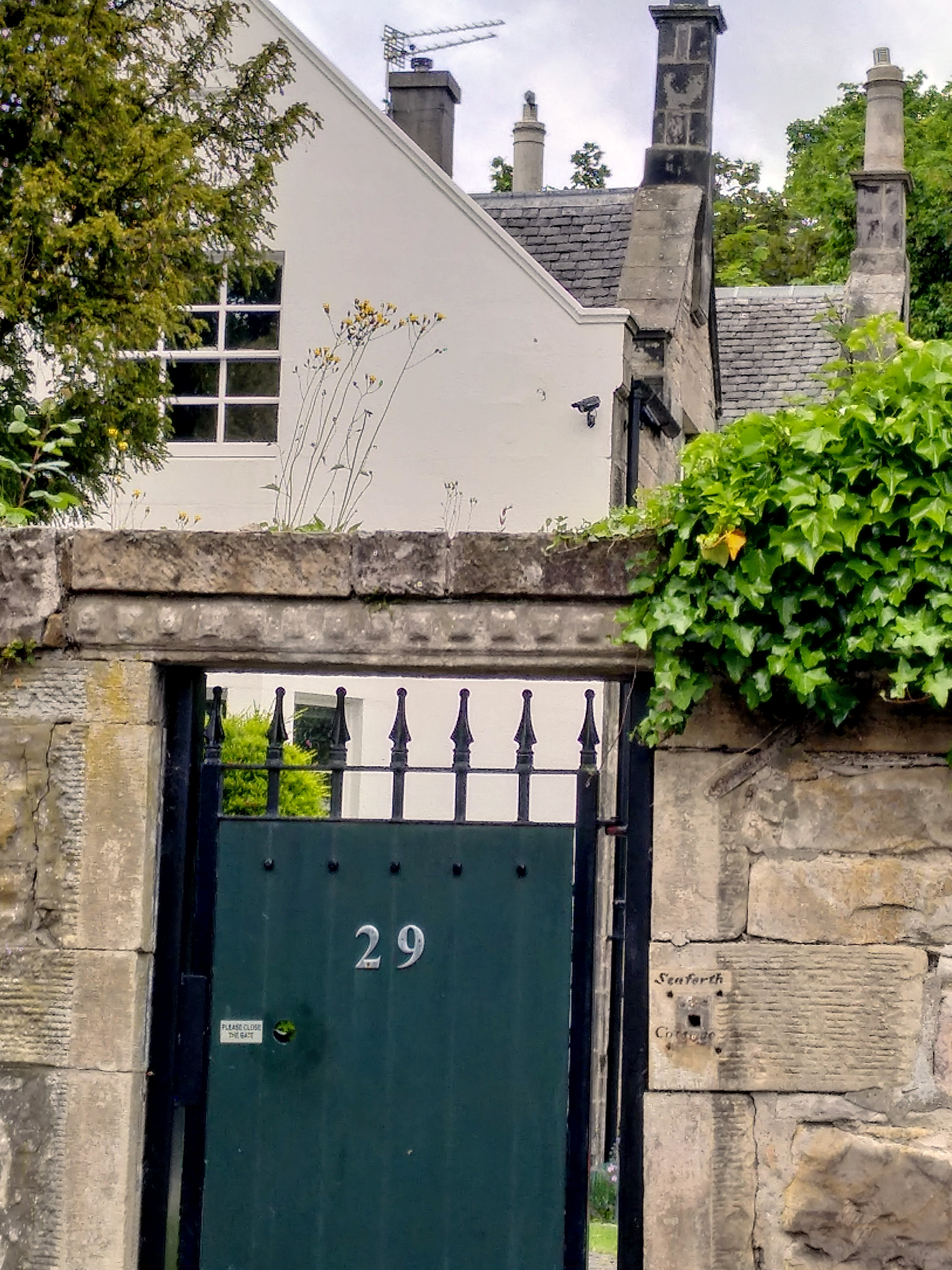
Seaforth Cottage 29 York Road Edinburgh

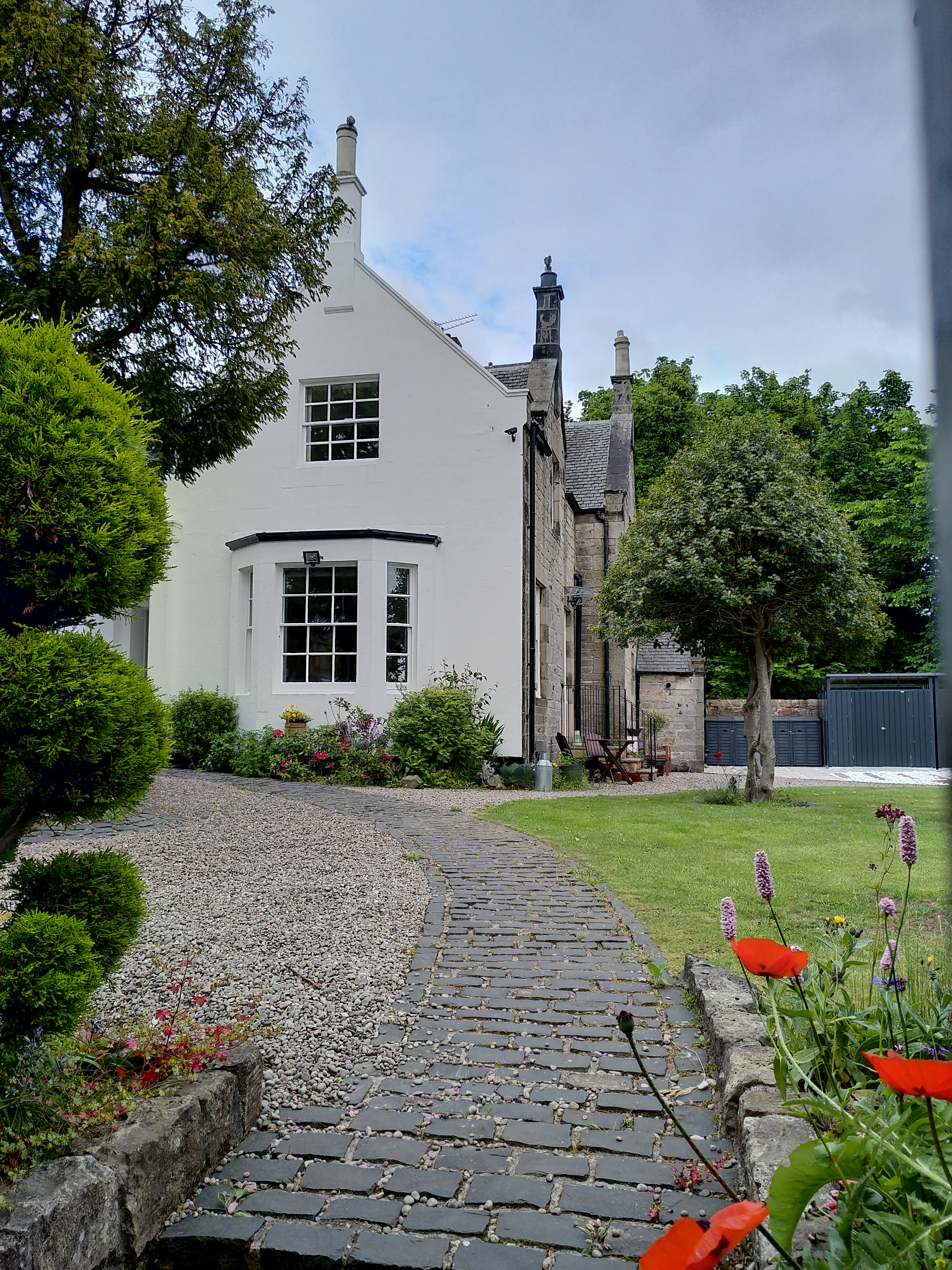
Seaforth Cottage 29 York Road - house

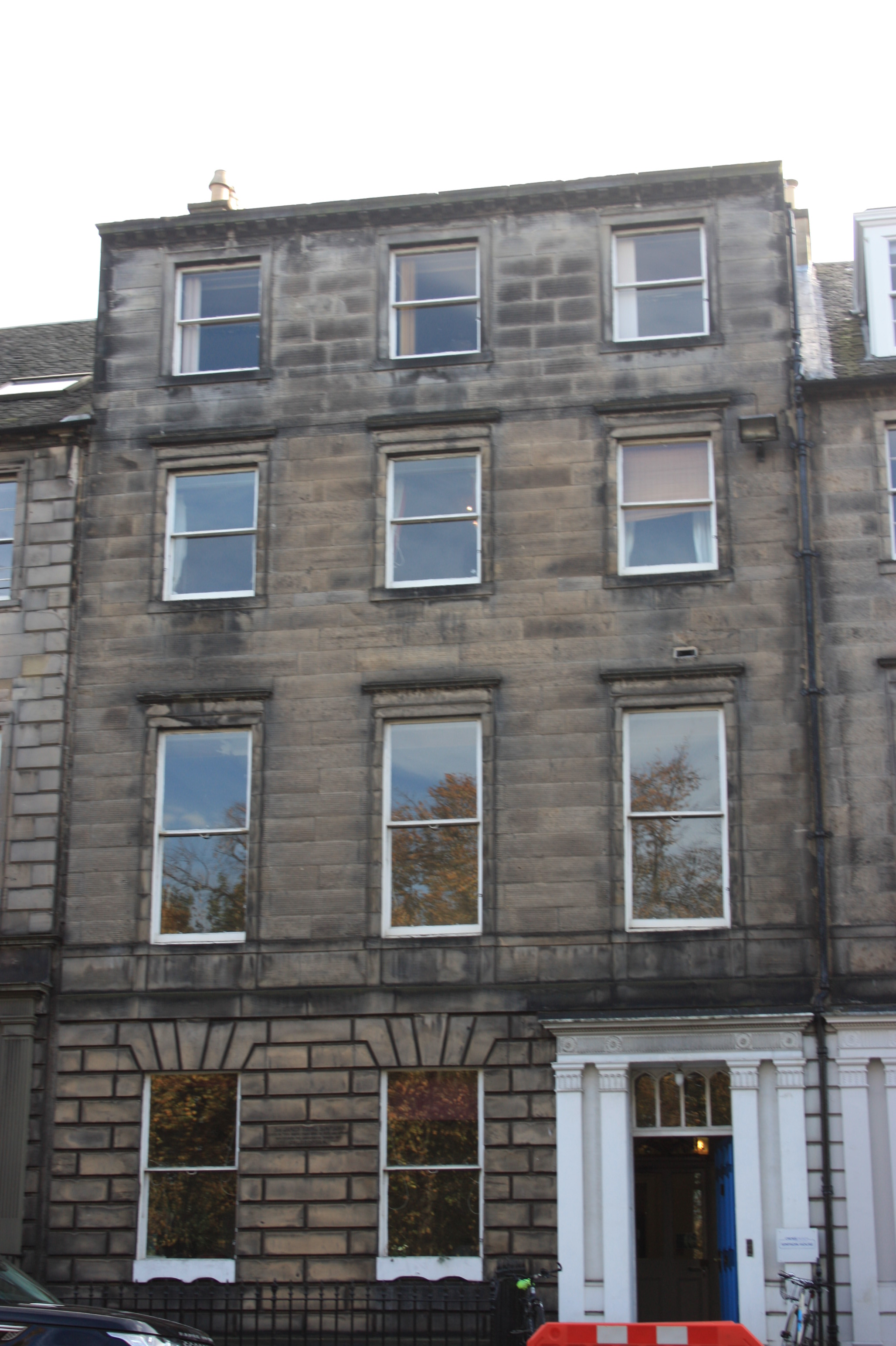
52 Queen Street, Edinburgh where Flockhart's chloroform was tried by Dr James Young Simpson

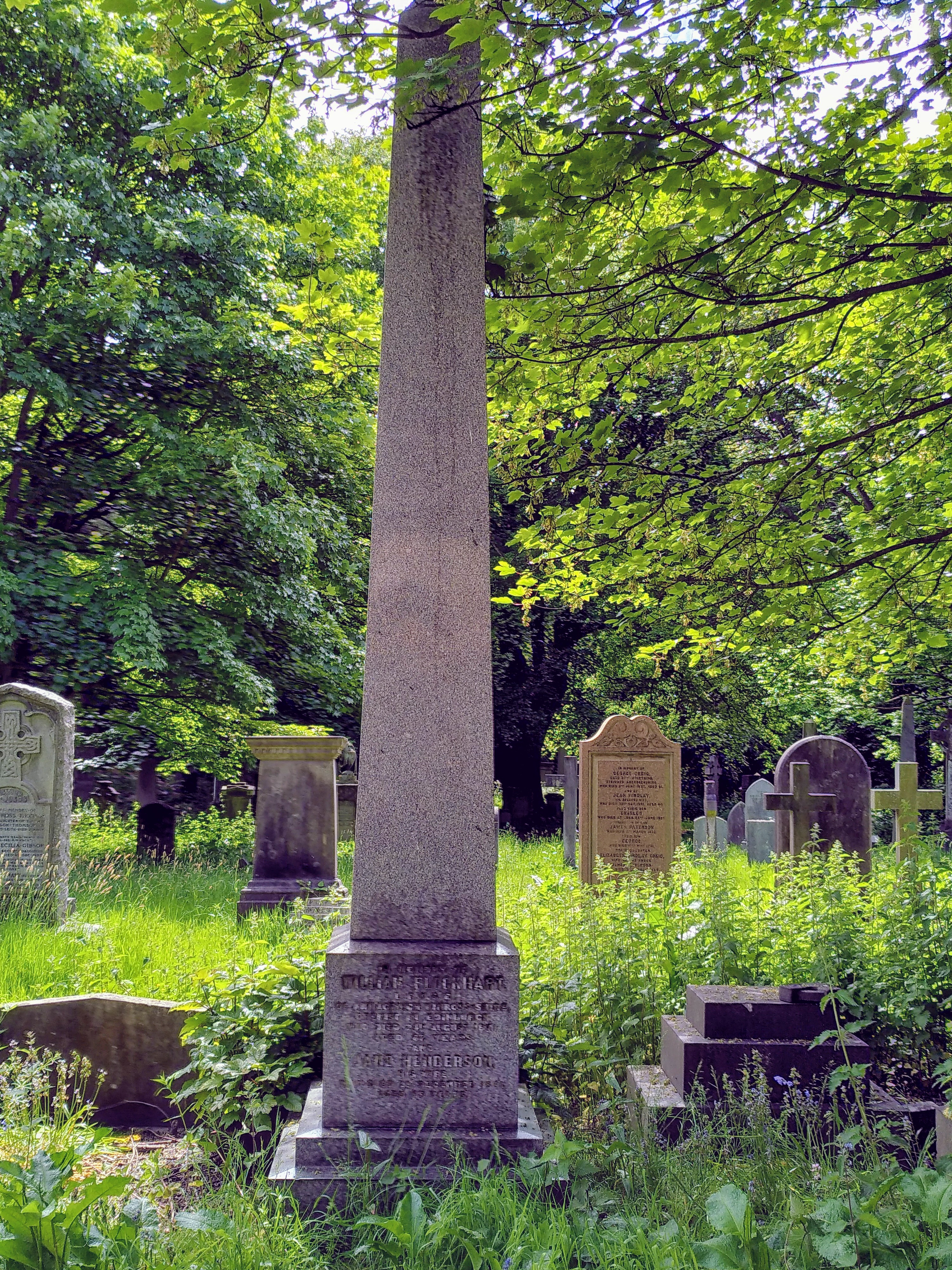
William Flockhart grave in Warriston Cemetery Edinburgh

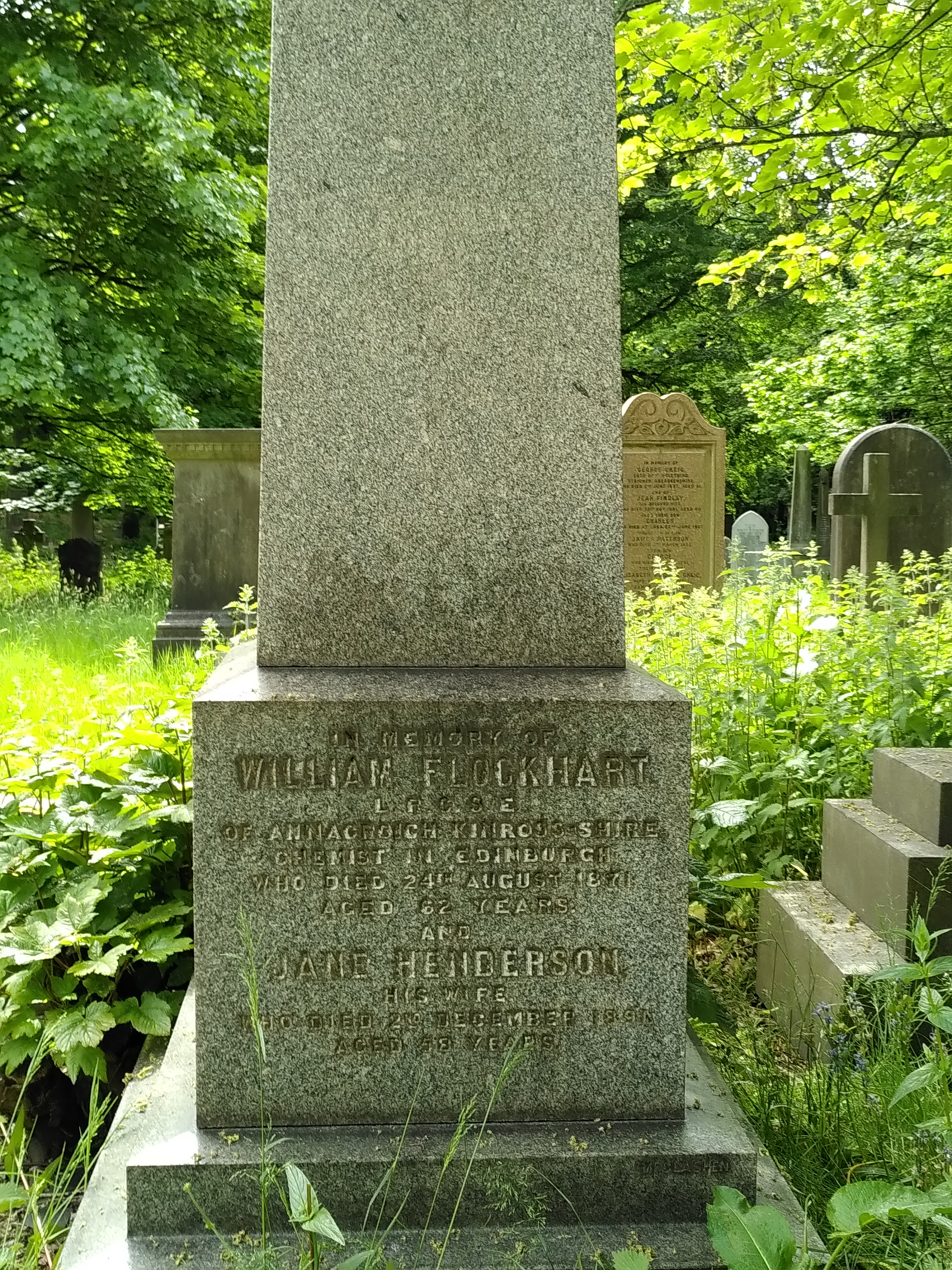
William Flockhart Grave front plinth with inscription

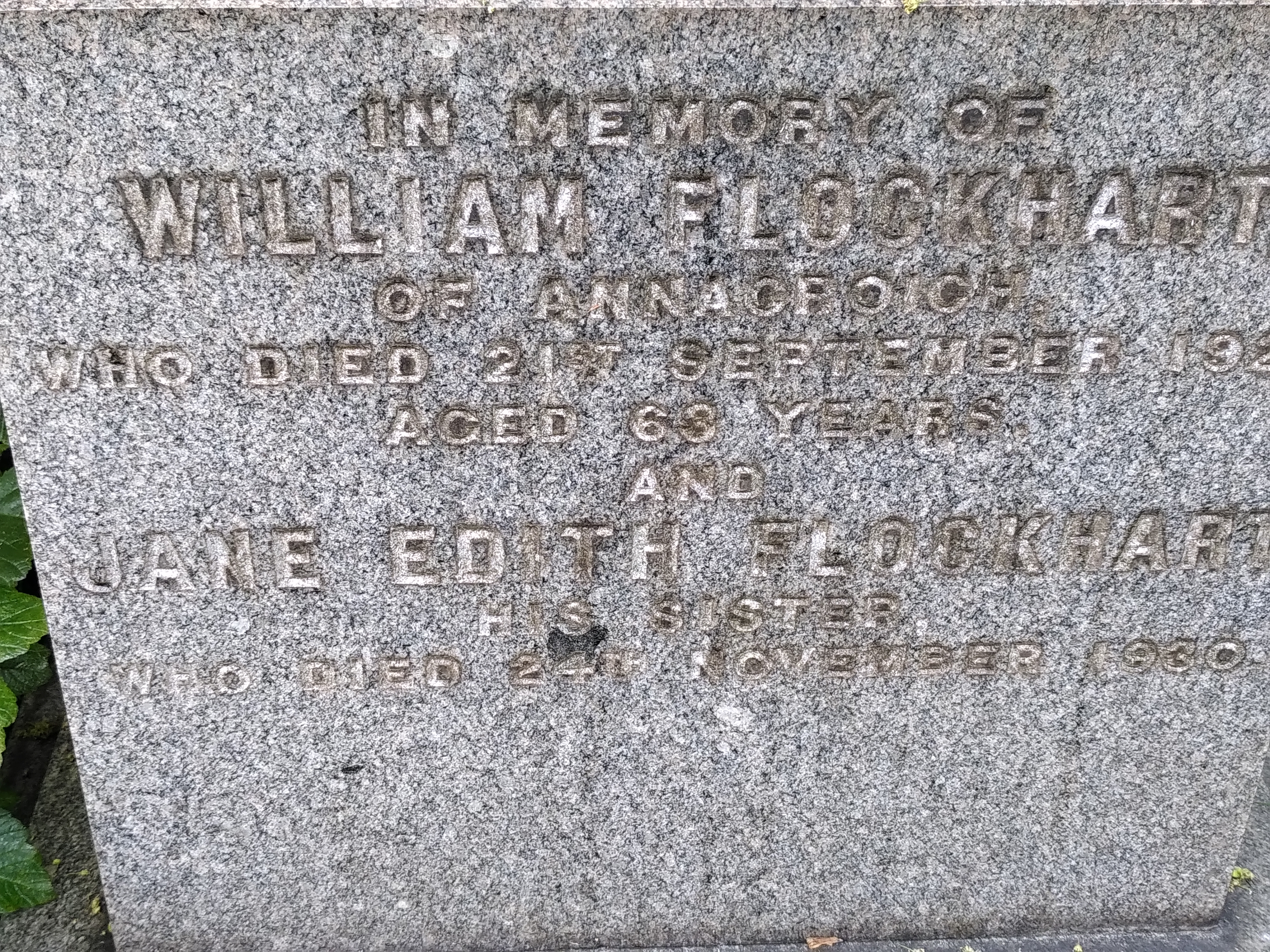
William Flockhart memorial, East face - inscription is in memory of William Flockhart (son) 1924, Jane Edith Flockhart (daughter) 1930

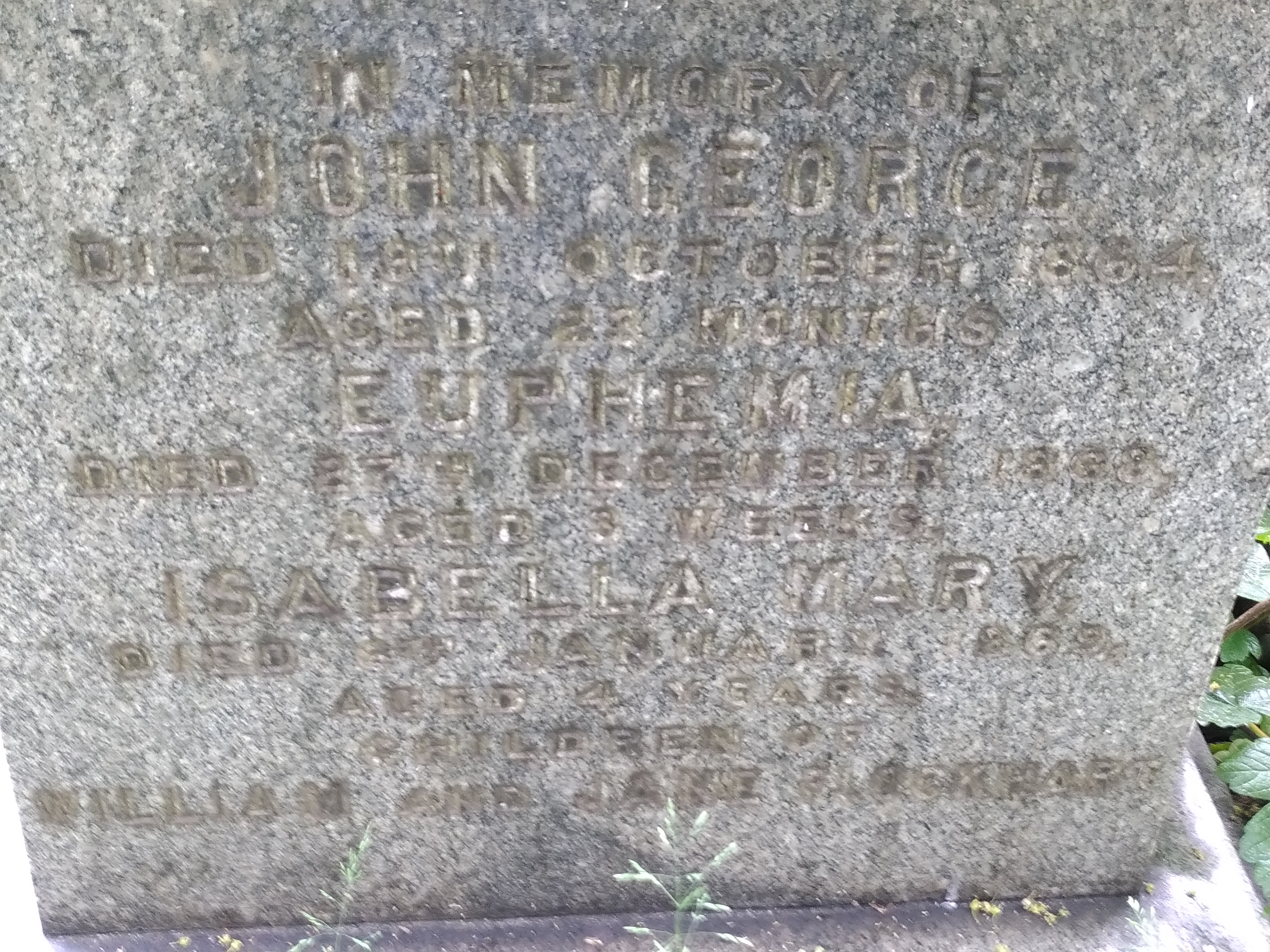
William Flockhart Memorial West face - inscription in memory of three children who died young: John George 1864, Euphemia 1868, Isabella Mary 1869.

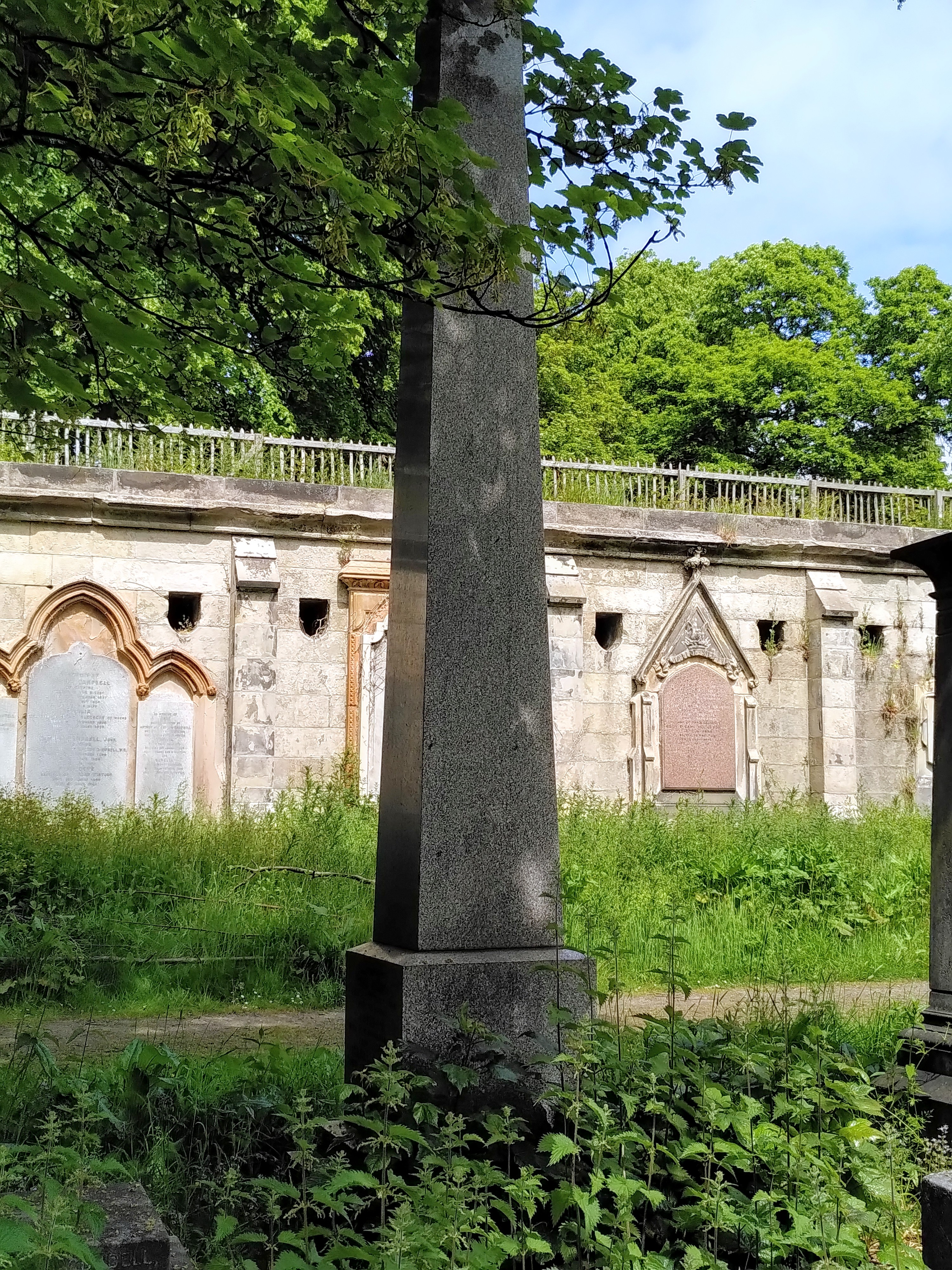
William Flockhart memorial (south east face) Warriston Cemetery Edinburgh

== See also ==
- Chloroform
- James Young Simpson
- James Duncan (surgeon)

== External resources ==
- Family papers archive at the National Records of Scotland re the family home at Annacroich https://discovery.nationalarchives.gov.uk/details/c/F19704
- British Medical Journal video about the legacy of James Young Simpson including Flockhart's role (via History Scotland)
- Museums and Galleries Edinburgh has an original wax stamp of Flockhart's including his address https://www.edinburghmuseums.org.uk/stories/auld-reekie-retold-surgeon-pharmacist-and-obstetrician
