= Johnson Matthey =

British multinational chemicals and sustainable technologies company

Johnson Matthey plc
- Type: Public limited company
- Traded as: LSE: JMAT; FTSE 250 component
- Industry: Chemicals; Precious metals
- Founded: 1817; 209 years ago (London, England)
- Founders: Percival Norton Johnson; George Matthey
- Headquarters: London, England, UK
- Key people: Patrick Thomas (Chairperson); Liam Condon (CEO)
- Products: Emission control catalysts, industrial catalysts, absorbents, process technologies, fine chemicals, active pharmaceutical ingredients, chemical products, medical device components, colours, coatings, fuel cell technology, battery technology
- Revenue: ▲£12,573 million (2026)
- Operating income: ▼£161 million (2026)
- Net income: ▼£(96) million (2026)
- Number of employees: 10,644 (2025)
- Website: matthey.com

Johnson Matthey plc is a British multinational speciality chemicals and sustainable technologies company headquartered in London, England. It is listed on the London Stock Exchange and is a constituent of the FTSE 250 Index.

== History ==
=== Early years ===
Johnson Matthey traces its origins to 1817, when Percival Norton Johnson set up business as a gold assayer in London. In 1851 George Matthey became a partner in the business, and its name was changed to Johnson & Matthey. The following year the firm was appointed official assayer and refiner to the Bank of England. The company had branches in the cities of Birmingham and Sheffield to supply the jewellery and silverware and cutlery trade with raw materials and ancillary supplies, such as silver solder and flux, which it manufactured.

In 1874, the company was commissioned to manufacture the kilogram reference standard, made from 90% platinum and 10% iridium, and held in the Bureau International des Poids et Mesures (International Bureau of Weights and Measures), and copies of it for international distribution. Johnson Matthey similarly also produced the International Prototype Metre and its copies.

=== 20th century ===
Beginning in 1957, the company published the journal Platinum Metals Review with the support of the Rustenburg Platinum Mines.

In the 1960s Johnson Matthey formed a subsidiary, Johnson Matthey Bankers (JMB), which took its seat in the London Gold Fixing. In the early 1980s the bank expanded its activities outside the bullion business and started making high-risk loans. Bank assets more than doubled between 1980 and 1984, and loans became concentrated to a few borrowers, including Mahmoud Sipra and his El Saeed group, Rajendra Sethia and ESAL Commodities, and Abdul Shamji. The quality of some of these loans turned out to be worse than expected, such as the £21 million lent to Abdul Shamji of Gomba Holdings (the then owner of Puddle Dock and the Mermaid Theatre in London). The size of the loans grew to exceed the level of the bank's capital. (Shamji was sentenced to 15 months in prison for lying about his assets during a High Court inquiry into the bank's collapse.)

Because JMB was one of five members of the London Gold Fixing, Bank of England officials were worried that if it became insolvent confidence in the other bullion banks would be undermined, and panic could spread to the rest of the British banking system. To prevent a wider banking crisis the Bank of England organised a rescue package on the evening of 30 September 1984, purchasing JMB for £1. Most of JMB's business was subsequently sold to Mase Westpac.

=== 21st century ===
In 2008 Johnson Matthey acquired Argillon, a business specialising in catalysts, for €214 million.

In October 2010 Johnson Matthey acquired InterCAT, a supplier of fluid catalytic cracking additives for the petroleum refining industry, for $56.2 million. Also in 2010 Johnson Matthey opened a new £34 million European emission control catalyst plant in Skopje, (North Macedonia), which produced catalysts for both light- and heavy-duty vehicles.

The company was one of the first FTSE 100 companies to produce an integrated annual report and won the Best Annual Report in the FTSE 100 in the ICSA Hermes Transparency in Governance Awards in 2012, which recognised how sustainability issues were 'described in a way that clearly links them to business strategy and performance, rather than leaving them in a silo or on the sidelines.'

In 2014, the company was shortlisted for Business in the Community's Responsible Business of the Year Award for its Sustainability 2017 programme.

In 2015, Johnson Matthey sold its gold and silver refining operations to Asahi Holdings, Inc., a Japanese firm.

In May 2025, the company agreed to sell its Catalyst Technologies arm to Honeywell for £1.8 billion. The value of the sale represents 80 per cent of the company's market value. The sale is expected to be completed in the first half of 2026.

== Operations ==
Johnson Matthey is organised into three main businesses: Clean Air, Hydrogen Technologies, and Platinum Group Metals Services.

== Factories ==
=== Europe ===
In 2009, Johnson Matthey opened a catalyst manufacturing plant in North Macedonia. It was expanded in 2012 and went on to become the largest exporter in North Macedonia.

In August 2018, Johnson Matthey started the construction of a new factory in Gliwice in Poland. The plant covers an area of approximately 23,000 m^{2} and is costing about PLN 450 million. The project will create about 400 new jobs. The plant consists of two production lines which will manufacture a range of catalysts.

== Environmental performance ==
In December 2008 US subsidiary Johnson Matthey Inc was fined $2.25 million for a felony violation of the United States Clean Water Act, after admitting to violating the act at its Salt Lake City precious metals refining facility. The violation related to the selective screening of wastewater samples for compliance analysis. Following the charge Johnson Matthey Inc contributed $750,000 to the National Fish and Wildlife Foundation and entered a three-year compliance agreement with the US Environmental Protection Agency.

== See also ==
- Gold
- Platinum
- Silver
- Johnson Matthey Technology Review
