= Extramural medical education in Edinburgh =

Medical education system

Extramural medical education in Edinburgh began over 200 years before the university medical faculty was founded in 1726 and extramural teaching continued thereafter for a further 200 years. Extramural is academic education which is conducted outside a university. In the early 16th century it was under the auspices of the Incorporation (later Royal College) of Surgeons of Edinburgh (RCSEd) and continued after the Faculty of Medicine was established by the University of Edinburgh in 1726. Throughout the late 18th and 19th centuries the demand for extramural medical teaching increased as Edinburgh's reputation as a centre for medical education grew. Instruction was carried out by individual teachers, by groups of teachers and, by the end of the 19th century, by private medical schools in the city. Together these comprised the Edinburgh Extramural School of Medicine. From 1896 many of the schools were incorporated into the Medical School of the Royal Colleges of Edinburgh under the aegis of the RCSEd and the Royal College of Physicians of Edinburgh (RCPE) and based at Surgeons' Hall. Extramural undergraduate medical education in Edinburgh stopped in 1948 with the closure of the Royal Colleges' Medical School following the Goodenough Report which recommended that all undergraduate medical education in the UK should be carried out by universities.

== Medical teaching to 1726 ==
Medical education in Edinburgh is considered to have started in 1505 when the Incorporation of Barber Surgeons gained their Seal of Cause or Charter, which requested that, as was common practice elsewhere in Europe. a condemned man should be dissected each year in order that the surgical apprentices might learn anatomy. The Incorporation appointed James Borthwick as a teacher of anatomy in 1647 and he, with Thomas Kincaid, instructed students in botany and pharmacy at the Incorporation's physic garden at Curryhill House. A Royal Patent to teach anatomy was granted in 1694 and this led to the Incorporation building the first Surgeons Hall on the site of Curryhill House in what is now Surgeons’ Square. Opened in 1697 this included an anatomical theatre where public anatomy dissections were performed. Among those participating in such dissections in the early 18th century were Archibald Pitcairne and Alexander Monteith.

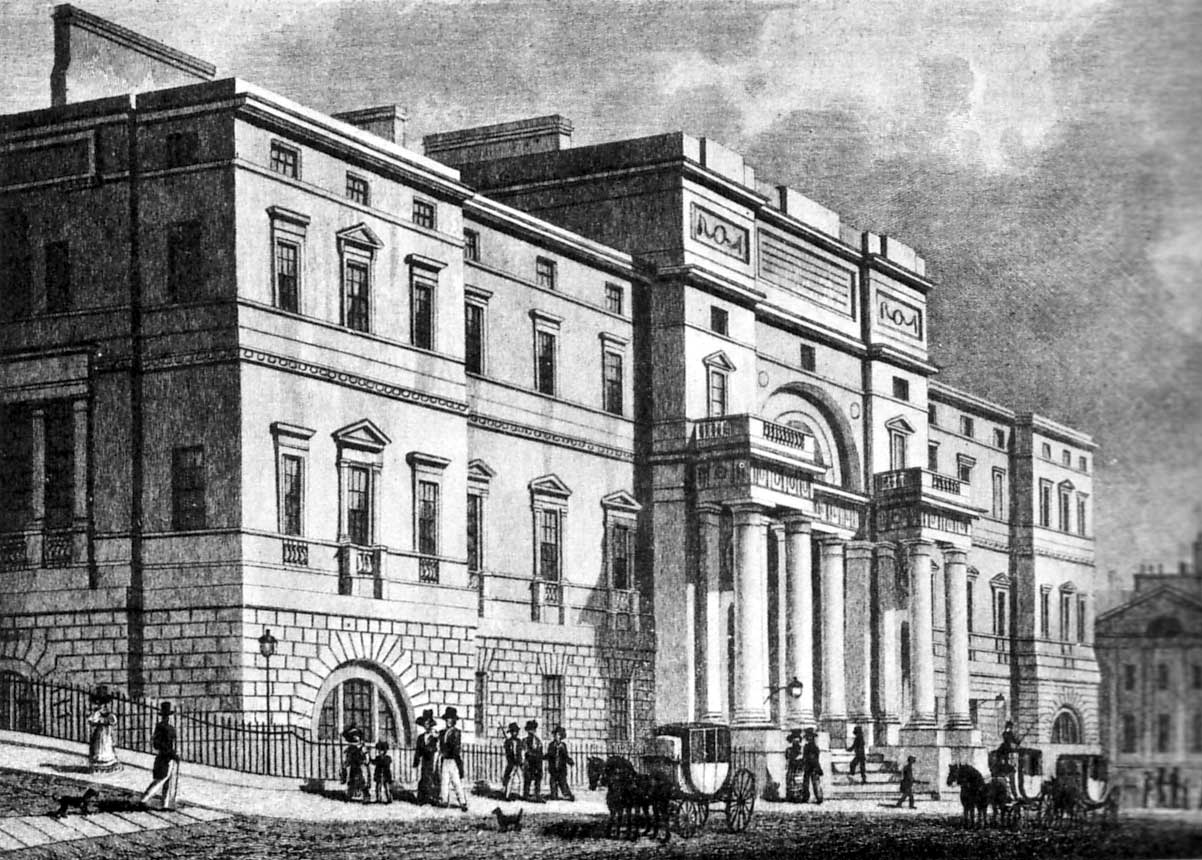
East facade of the Old College, University of Edinburgh

== The Faculty of Medicine established ==
The University of Edinburgh, founded in 1582, did not begin to teach medical topics until the early 18th century, with the appointment of Robert Eliot as Professor of Anatomy. John Monro, an Edinburgh surgeon, who had obtained his medical degree at Leiden University in Holland, returned to Edinburgh with a view to setting up a medical school within the university and with an associated teaching hospital on the Leiden model. With the local support of Lord Provost George Drummond, and national support from the Earl of Ilay, Monro saw his ambition fulfilled starting with the appointment of his son, Alexander Monro primus, as Professor of Anatomy in 1719. Monro at first taught extra-murally at Surgeons Hall moving his classes to the university in 1725. The appointment of Leiden medical graduates Drs John Innes, Andrew Plummer, John Rutherford and Andrew Sinclair as university professors in 1726 marked the foundation of the university medical school, which was soon teaching a broad medical curriculum and conferred medical degrees by examination. Until this time the only way to obtain a medical degree in the British Isles was from the Universities of Oxford or Cambridge. Under the terms of the Test Acts these were only open to communicant members of the Church of England. Courses could take up to 12 years and did not include hospital clinical teaching. The Edinburgh medical school was open to all faiths, lectures were in English, bedside teaching was included in the curriculum and it was cheaper than European universities or Oxford or Cambridge. These combined to make Edinburgh popular for those seeking a medical degree, who came initially from within the British Isles but increasingly from the then British Empire.

The associated teaching hospital, opened in 1729, was initially situated opposite the top of Robertson's Close off what is now Infirmary Street. At first this had only six beds increasing to eight. The hospital was awarded a Royal charter in 1736, the first voluntary hospital to achieve this accolade. By this time it was too small to meet the demands and a new Royal Infirmary of Edinburgh (RIE) was built next to Surgeons' Hall. This building, designed by William Adam and opened in 1741, could house 228 patients and was at that time the largest voluntary hospital in the British Isles.

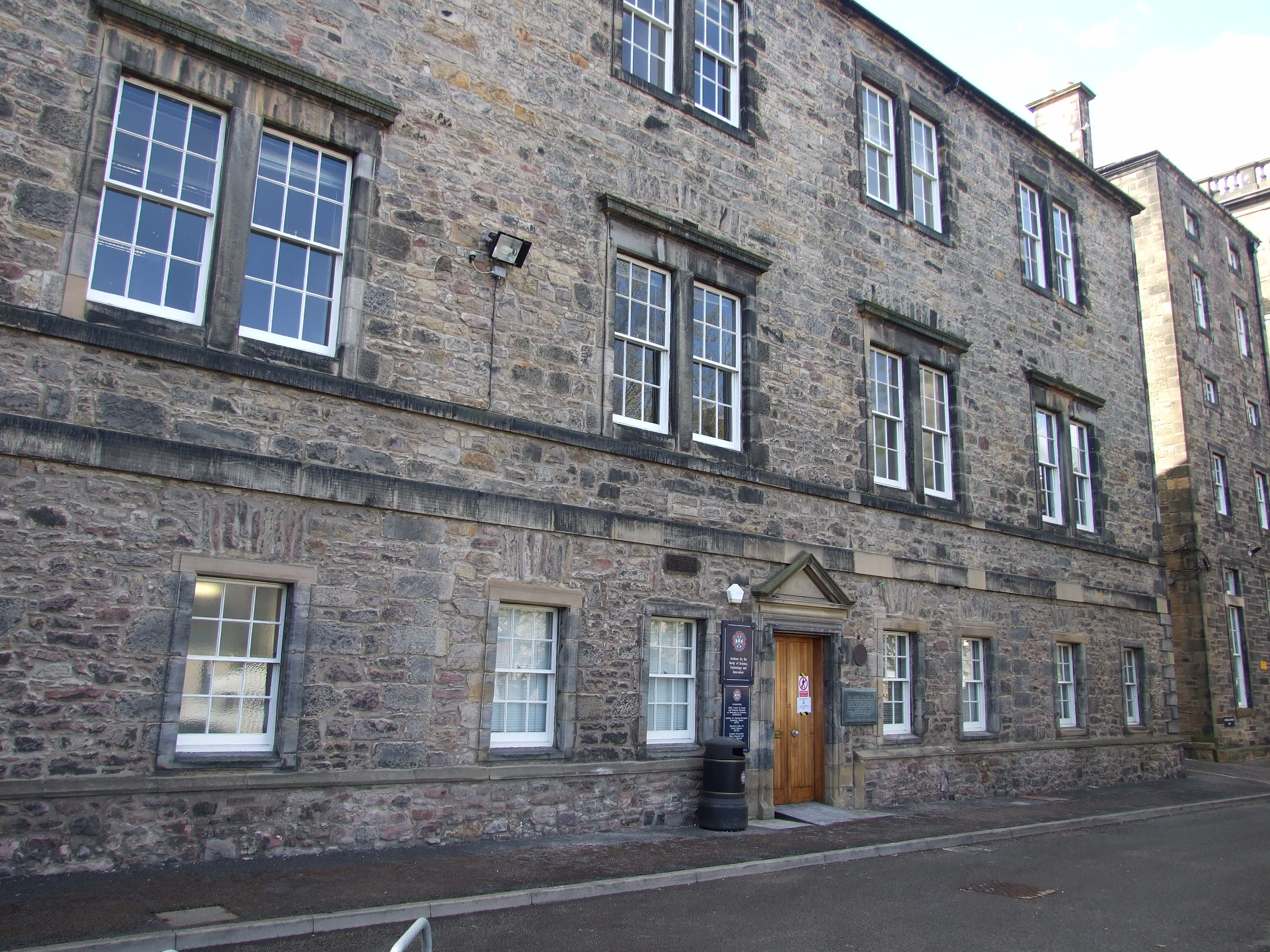
Old Surgeons' Hall, Surgeons Square, built in 1697. - geograph.org.uk - 1283610

== Extramural teaching in the 18th century ==
Edinburgh's attraction as a medical teaching centre was further enhanced by the growing reputation of Alexander Monro primus. Yet in the first 25 years of the medical faculty an average of only three students per year opted to progress to graduate MD. Many chose to sit for the qualification of Licentiateship of the RCSEd which became available from 1770, while others went into practice with no formal institutional qualification. For all these groups the kudos of having studied at Edinburgh could enhance their status and career progress.

Extramural teaching resumed in the late 18th century. James Rae, a surgeon who became president of the RCSEd, lectured on anatomy, surgery and dentistry at Surgeons' Hall from 1772. From 1779 John Aitken began to teach classes in anatomy, physiology, surgery and midwifery at the Anatomical Theatre in Surgeons' Square, which was probably in Old Surgeons' Hall. The surgeon John Bell taught anatomy in his house in the square from 1787 and was joined then succeeded by his brother Charles Bell, later professor of surgery at the University of London. Their classes attracted large number of students as they taught surgical anatomy in contrast to Alexander Monro secundus, the university professor of anatomy, who was not a practising surgeon.

Extramural teaching of materia medica was carried out in the Royal Public Dispensary which had been established by Andrew Duncan in 1776. In 1805 John Abercrombie was appointed to the staff and established a large teaching practice there.

== Extramural teaching in the 19th century ==
In the first part of the 19th century extramural teaching centred on Surgeons Square. This was bounded on its south side by Old Surgeons' Hall, which was sold to the Royal Infirmary in 1832 and served as a cholera hospital and then a fever hospital before being acquired by the University of Edinburgh. Extramural teaching took place in the large detached houses on the east and west sides of the square. Number one Surgeons' Square on the north side was built as a teaching facility with a lecture theatre. In the latter half of the century teaching also took place in buildings near the university, chiefly in Brown Square, Argyle Square, Chambers Street and the new Surgeons' Hall. Extramural teaching expanded rapidly from 1855 when the university was forced into recognising extramural classes as counting towards its medical degrees. James Syme had written to the Town Council in 1840 requesting such recognition and when the university refused the matter was taken to court and eventually to the House of Lords who found in favour of recognition of extramural classes. This recognition was further expanded in 1858 by the Commissioners appointed as regulators of the university curriculum under the Universities (Scotland) Act, 1858.

From 1896 many of these small medical schools were incorporated into the Medical School of the Royal Colleges, which from 1896 became by far the largest teaching establishment in the extramural school.

Many of the lecturers in the extramural school taught there in the early part of their careers. Many would go on to become well known in later life in substantive posts or academic chairs. A full list of lecturers was compiled by John Comrie and published in his History of Scottish Medicine.

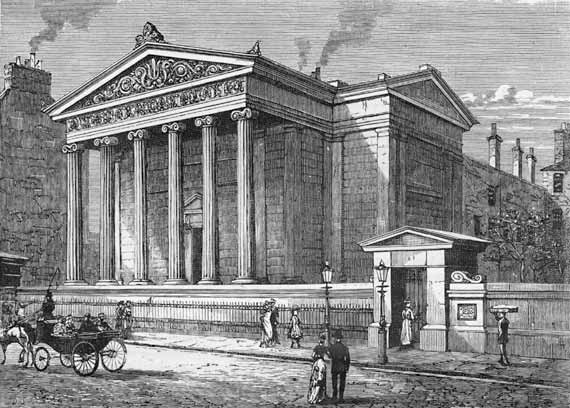
Surgeons Hall, Edinburgh; the main location for extramural medical teaching. Etching 1840.

=== Surgeons' Hall ===
Extramural teaching continued at Surgeons Hall throughout the century. By 1860 a broadly based curriculum of medical subjects was taught and, after the House of Lord's judgement, these were recognised by universities as counting toward the degrees of MB, CM. Despite the fact that these classes took place at Surgeons' Hall, a variety of medical subjects were taught. This was by far the largest of the extramural schools of medicine in Edinburgh.

In the latter half of the century lecturers included:

- William Tennant Gairdner, Daniel Rutherford Haldane, George William Balfour, James Warburton Begbie (Medicine)
- Andrew Douglas Maclagan, Robert Edmund Scoresby-Jackson (Materia medica)
- Joseph Lister, Patrick Heron Watson, John Duncan, James Dunsmure, James Spence, Joseph Bell, Thomas Annandale (Surgery)
- Thomas Grainger Stewart (Diseases of children)
- John Struthers (Anatomy)

- Diarmid Noel Paton, William Rutherford Sanders, James Bell Pettigrew, Arthur Gamgee (Physiology)
- R Haldane, Thomas Grainger Stewart, John Wylie (Pathology)
- William Walker, Douglas Argyle Robertson (Diseases of the Eye)
- Robert Spittal (Medical acoustics)
- John Smith (Dental Surgery)
- Alexander Keiller, James Mathews Duncan (Midwifery)
- David Skae (Mental Illness)
- Henry Littlejohn (Medical Jurisprudence)

=== John Bell's House, Surgeons' Square ===
John Bell's house was on the south east corner of the square but did not have a number. It was built specifically for the teaching of anatomy and surgery and was thought to have been the first house in Edinburgh designed for this purpose. John Bell, had begun to lecture there in 1787 and was joined by his brother Charles Bell who succeeded him in 1799. When Charles Bell left for London in 1804 anatomy was taught by John Allan and then, from 1824 by William Cullen grand-nephew of the eminent physician William Cullen. From 1825 the house was used to store the anatomical collection of Charles Bell, which had been purchased by the RCSEd, and its final use was as a lock hospital, for the nearby Royal Infirmary.

=== 9 Surgeons' Square ===
Number nine Surgeons' Square, known as John Gordon's house, was situated on the south-west corner of the square just to the west of Old Surgeons' Hall. John Gordon, a surgeon at the Royal Infirmary, gave lecture courses here on anatomy and physiology from 1808 until his death in 1818 aged 32 years. His textbook A System of Anatomy was published in 1815. John Thomson, the extramural professor of surgery at the RCSEd, bought the house and gave lectures on surgery there from 1818 and later also lectured there on the practice of physic. His lecture course was taken over by his son William Thomson from 1830 until his appointment as Professor of Physic at the University of Glasgow in 1841.

William Sharpey taught anatomy in the house from 1831 until he was appointed Professor of Anatomy and Physiology at the University of London. He was assisted as a lecturer by Allen Thomson until the latter's appointment to the Chair of Physiology at the University of Edinburgh. Others who lectured here in the 1830s included John William Turner and, who lectured on anatomy and James Young Simpson who lectured on midwifery.

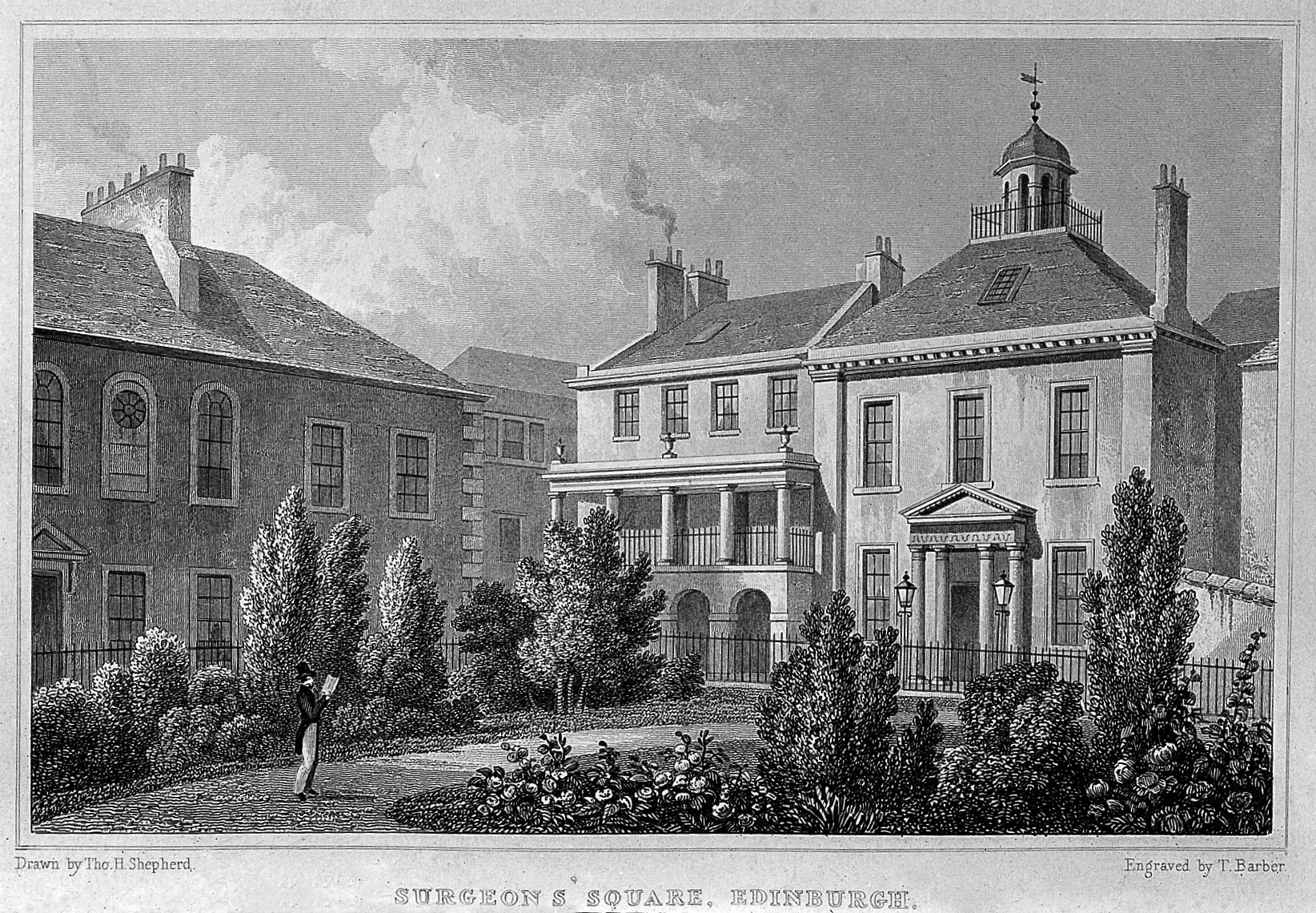
Surgeon's Square, Edinburgh in 1828. Thomas Shepherd. (Wellcome L0001728EA). Old Surgeons' Hall is on the left. The building in the centre is number 10 Surgeons' Square, the anatomy school of John Barclay and Robert Knox.

=== 10 Surgeons' Square ===
Number ten, in the south-west corner of Surgeons' Square, had been built for use as a lecture theatre for the physician Andrew Duncan senior. The anatomist John Barclay bought the building in 1800 and began to teach anatomy. The house also contained a dissection room. His classes proved extremely popular and by the time he retired in 1825 he was teaching some 300 students per year. After Charles Bell left Edinburgh in 1808 and Alexander Monro secundus retired from anatomy teaching at the university the same year, Barclay became the most popular anatomy teacher in Edinburgh. His popularity was further enhanced by the unpopularity of Alexander Monro tertius, who had succeeded his father in the university chair. Barclay had amassed a large collection of comparative anatomy specimens used for teaching and this collection was bought by the RCSEd to form the Barclay collection in their museum. Barclay was succeeded in his anatomy school by Robert Knox. Knox catalogued the Barclay collection and the Charles Bell collection as curator of the Surgeons' Hall museum. The greatly enlarged collection was housed from 1832 in the new Surgeons' Hall which had been built to accommodate it. Knox was also a gifted anatomy teacher in marked contrast to Alexander Monro tertius at the university. Knox's classes were made more attractive by offering anatomical dissection under his supervision. As the demand for bodies for dissection exceeded supply, the serial killers William Burke and William Hare sold the bodies of their victims to Knox's anatomy school. After Burke was hanged for these crimes Knox was exonerated by a committee of 'distinguished citizens' and continued to teach at 10 Surgeons' Square until 1833. At the height of his popularity as a teacher in 1826, Knox attracted over 500 students to his anatomy classes, the largest number ever seen in the British Isles. William Fergusson assisted Knox with anatomy teaching until 1840 when he was appointed professor of surgery at King's College London and later became sergeant-surgeon to Queen Victoria.

=== 1 Surgeons' Square ===
The land at the north side of Surgeons' Square was owned by the engraver William Home Lizars who in 1825 built an anatomy school with a lecture theatre for his brother John Lizars a local surgeon. John Lizars taught anatomy and surgery and was succeeded by Peter David Handyside, Henry Lonsdale and James Spence. The building was later used as a museum, as a school, as part of the University Settlement and latterly as a nursery school. It is one of only three buildings still standing in the square in 2020.

=== 3 Surgeons' Square ===
David Craigie taught anatomy from 1818 and later taught clinical medicine and practice of medicine. He later became president of the RCPE. From 1835 chemistry was taught by Andrew Fyfe who later went on to become professor of chemistry at the University of Aberdeen. From 1845 chemistry was taught here by Thomas Anderson, who went on to lecture in Glasgow where he drew the attention of Joseph Lister to the works of Louis Pasteur and supplied Lister with his first sample of carbolic acid, from which Lister developed antiseptic theory.

=== Brown Square ===
Brown Square was built as a residential development in 1763 and demolished in the late nineteenth century. The Brown Square School of Medicine was established by James Syme, later Professor of Surgery in the university. Syme taught anatomy and surgery and was joined in the school by John Macintosh who taught medicine and midwifery and John Argyll Robertson who taught materia medica. When Syme resigned from the school his anatomy class was continued by Alexander Jardine Lizars, later professor of anatomy in the University of Aberdeen. The school closed in 1836 when the teaching was transferred to 11 Argyle Square.

=== 11 Argyle Square ===
The Argyll Square school was active early in the 1830s and expanded when teaching activity from Brown Square was transferred. It was known mainly as an anatomy school where the subject was taught by Peter Handyside, Alexander Keiller, Alexander Jardine Lizars and John Struthers, both of whom later became professors of anatomy at the University of Aberdeen.

Lecturers in other subjects included:

Thomas Wood (practice of medicine); John Lizars (surgery); Dr Marr (midwifery); David Skae (medical jurisprudence); J A Robertson (materia medica).

=== Marshall Street ===
The School of Medicine and Pharmacy was located her in the latter years of the century. Lecturers included:

Alexander Johnstone (botany); J R Paterson (chemistry); E Urquhart (materia medica and pharmacy); Dr Matheson (midwifery); Dr Matheson and Alexander Keiller (medicine).

=== Minto House, Chambers Street ===
Minto House, a large town house owned by the Elliot family was bought by James Syme in 1829 and converted into a small surgical teaching hospital with an operating theatre and lecture room. There Syme taught surgery as did his assistants Alexander Peddie, later President of the Royal College of Physicians of Edinburgh and John Brown, whose account of the work of the hospital is described in his novel Rab and his Friends. The hospital closed in 1852. Minto House was demolished in 1873 and 'new' Minto house was built on the site, becoming numbers 18-20 Chambers Street. Number 20 Chambers Chambers Street also housed a medical school.

=== New Minto House, 20 Chambers Street. ===
In 1878 a medical school was opened with the anatomical teaching done by James Cossar Ewart, later Professor of Natural History at the University of Aberdeen. He was succeeded as anatomy lecturer by Johnston Symington later Professor of Anatomy at Queen's College, Belfast, and he in turn was succeeded by the surgeon Alexander Miles. In 1895 the anatomy dissecting room was taken over by the Edinburgh School of Medicine for Women, New Minto House was subsequently bought by the University of Edinburgh.

=== Edinburgh School of Medicine for Women, Surgeons' Square ===
Sophia Jex-Blake, a pioneer of medical education for women, founded the school in 1886. Most of its teaching took place in Surgeons' Square, with clinical teaching at Leith Hospital.as the RIE still continued to refuse access to women students. With competition from the College of Medicine for Women and beset with financial problems, the school closed in 1898.

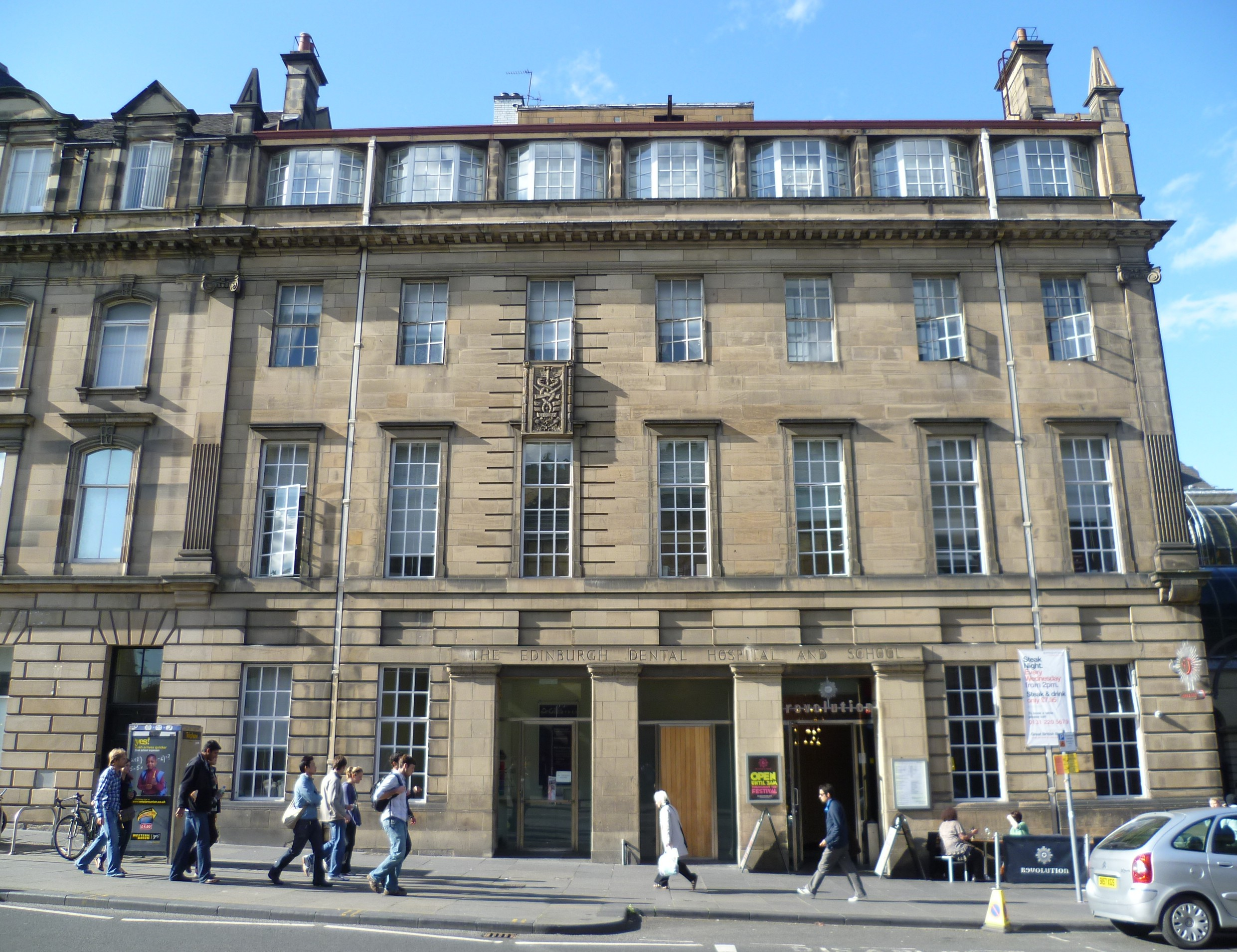
30 Chambers Street, Edinburgh. The building which housed the College of Medicine for Women was demolished and replaced in 1927 by this building, the former Edinburgh Dental Hospital

=== Edinburgh College of Medicine for Women, 30 Chambers Street ===
The Edinburgh College of Medicine for Women was founded in 1989 by The Scottish Association for the Medical Education of Women, one of whose leading members was John Inglis, father of Elsie Inglis. This was at a time when women were not admitted to university medical schools in the UK. Clinical teaching was initially at Glasgow Royal Infirmary as the RIE still did not accept women for clinical teaching in its wards. By July 1892 the college had sufficient funds and sufficient influence to have two wards in the RIE opened to the women medical students. The college moved to new premises in 1908 and merged with the School of Medicine of the Royal Colleges in 1916.

Lecturers included:

- John W Ballantyne (Midwifery and gynaecology)
- William Craig - (Materia medica)
- James Hodsdon - (Surgery) went on to be knighted and elected president of the RCSEd.
- William Keiller (Anatomy) became Professor of Anatomy at the University of Texas at Galveston.[16]
- Harvey Littlejohn (Public Health) became professor of Forensic Medicine at the University of Edinburgh
- William Ivison Macadam (Chemistry)
- Robert Philip (Medicine) later a pioneer in the treatment of tuberculosis and president of the RCPE
- William Russell (Pathology) later Professor of Medicine at the University of Edinburgh and president of the RCPE

=== Queens' College ===
Queen's College was the first association of extramural lecturers and schools. It was known to be active from 1841 to 1842. Classes were held at several different locations, with most at Brown Square and Argyle Square. From 1841 the lectures were recognised by the Universities of London, Oxford, Cambridge, St Andrews and Aberdeen, the Royal Colleges of Surgeons of England, Edinburgh and Ireland, the Apothecaries Hall, London and the Faculty of Physicians and Surgeons of Glasgow. Lecturers included Robert Knox (11 Argyle Square) - anatomy and surgery; William Campbell (11 Argyle Square) -midwifery; James Marr (3 Surgeons' Square) - midwifery David Skae (11 Argyle Square) -medical jurisprudence; George Atkin (23 Brown Square) - botany.

== Extramural teaching in the 20th century ==
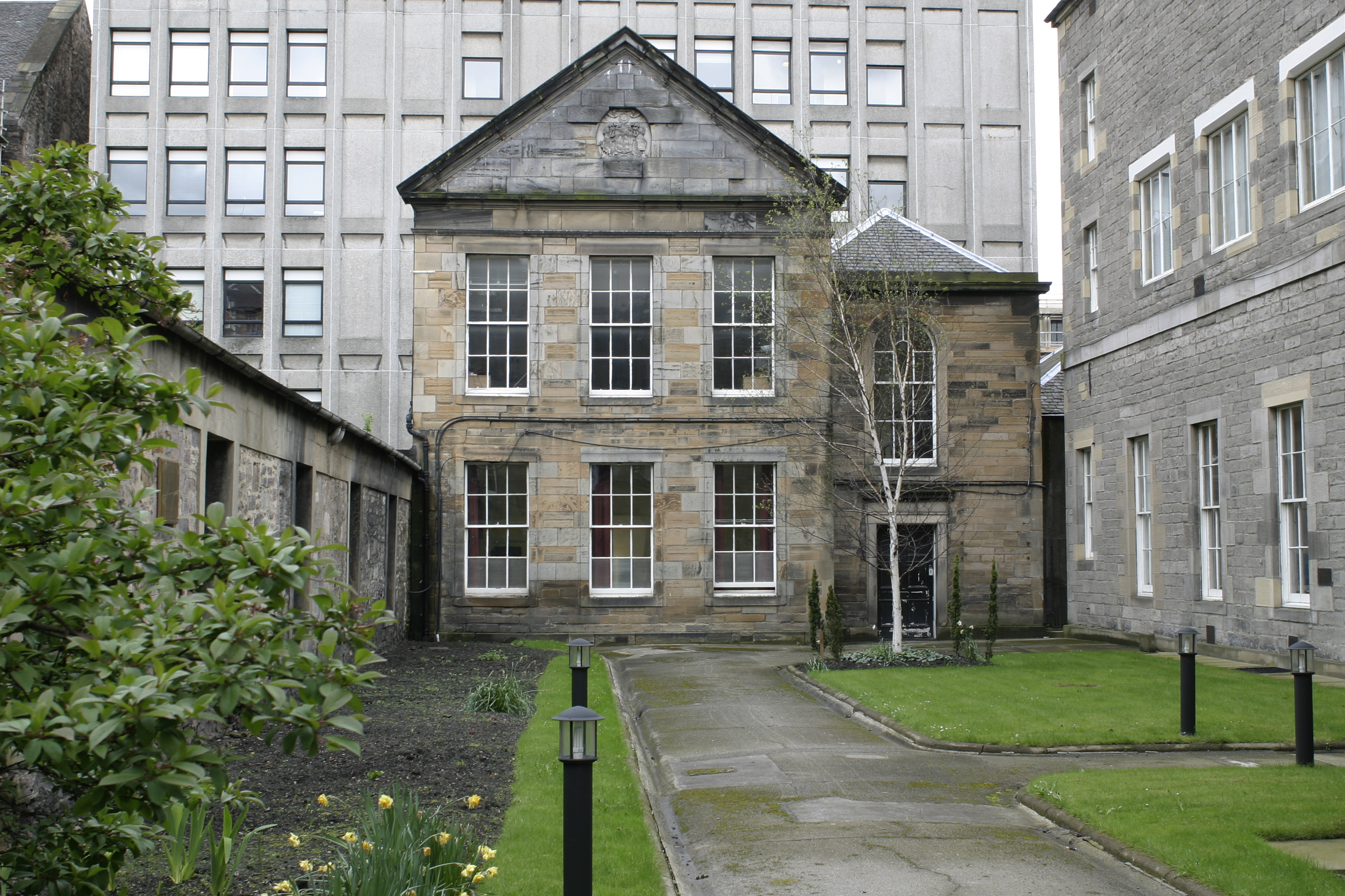
The former School of Medicine of the Edinburgh Royal Colleges

=== The School of Medicine of the Royal Colleges of Edinburgh ===
In the last decade of the nineteenth century an Association of Extramural Teachers was formed with a view to consolidating most of the smaller schools into a single institution under the aegis of the two medical Royal Colleges in Edinburgh. Dr (later Sir) Henry Littlejohn was chairman of the association and a leading figure in the formation of this new school. The first Board of Governors was chaired by Alexander Russell Simpson and included John Duncan, Harvey Littlejohn, David Berry Hart, Noel Paton, and Patrick Heron Watson. In 1894 the Scottish universities agreed that university students could attend half of their classes in the new school as counting towards a degree. From 1896 many of the small medical schools were incorporated into the School of Medicine of the Royal Colleges, which from 1896 became by far the largest teaching establishment in the extramural school. While most of the classes were held in Surgeons' Hall, there was teaching on smaller sites including The New School in Bristo Street, Park Place School., Minto House and 27 Nicolson Square. Clinical teaching was provided at the Royal Infirmary of Edinburgh, Leith Hospital and the Sick Children's Hospital. Clinical teaching continued in local dispensaries enabling students to learn about community care and experience in dispensary practice became part of the medical curriculum in 1890. The Royal Public Dispensary had been founded in 1776, the New Town Dispensary in 1815 and there was also clinical teaching at the Provident Dispensary and the Livingstone Memorial Dispensary.

In session 1896-97 there were 931 students, rising to 1317 the following year and remaining over 1000 until World War I. At the time of its closure in 1948, about 350 students were enrolled. The School attracted many students drawn from marginal groups or those facing educational barriers, initially women and in later years students from the then British Empire and pollical refugees. Many of the students who attended the classes were also registered with the University of Edinburgh and went on to graduate with the degree of MB ChB. The remainder aimed to sit the Triple Qualification, an examination held by the medical Royal Colleges and recognised by the General Medical Council.

The Goodenough Report published in 1944 recommended that all undergraduate medical education in the UK should be carried out by universities. In the face of this the school closed in 1948.

Lecturers included:

- Joseph Ryland Whittaker, Richard James Arthur Berry (Anatomy)
- Agnes Rose MacGregor, Peter MacCallum, Robert Muir (Pathology)
- A Nimmo Smith (Bacteriology)
- James Ormiston Affleck, Byrom Bramwell, William Russel, George Alexander Gibson, Robert William Philip, John Comrie, Douglas Chalmers Watson, Andrew Rae Gilchrist, T R R Todd, David Murray Lyon (Medicine)
- Alexander Pirie Watson, Montagu Cotterill, Charles Walker Cathcart, William James Stuart, John William Struthers, Henry Wade, G L Chiene, James Methuen Graham, Walter Quarry Wood, Walter Mercer (Surgery)
- Robert Johnstone, Benjamin Philip Watson, James Haig Fergusson, Douglas Miller, Clifford Kennedy, Ernest Fahmy (Midwifery/Gynaecology)
- Arthur H H Sinclair, Harry Moss Traquair (Ophthalmology)
- Douglas Guthrie, Ion Simson Hall, G Ewart Martin (Diseases of Ear, Nose and Throat)
- Dawson Turner (Radiology)
