= Alexander Keiller =

Alexander Keiller or Keillor may refer to:

- Alexander Keiller (archaeologist) (1899–1955), Scottish archaeologist who worked at Avebury
  - Alexander Keiller Museum, Avebury
- Alexander Keiller (businessman) (1804–1874), Scottish businessman who founded the Swedish company Göteborgs Mekaniska Verkstad
- Alexander Keiller (physician) (1811–1892), Scottish physician and obstetrician
- Alex Keillor (1869–1960), Scottish footballer
