= John Duncan (surgeon) =

Scottish surgeon

John Duncan FRCSE FRSE
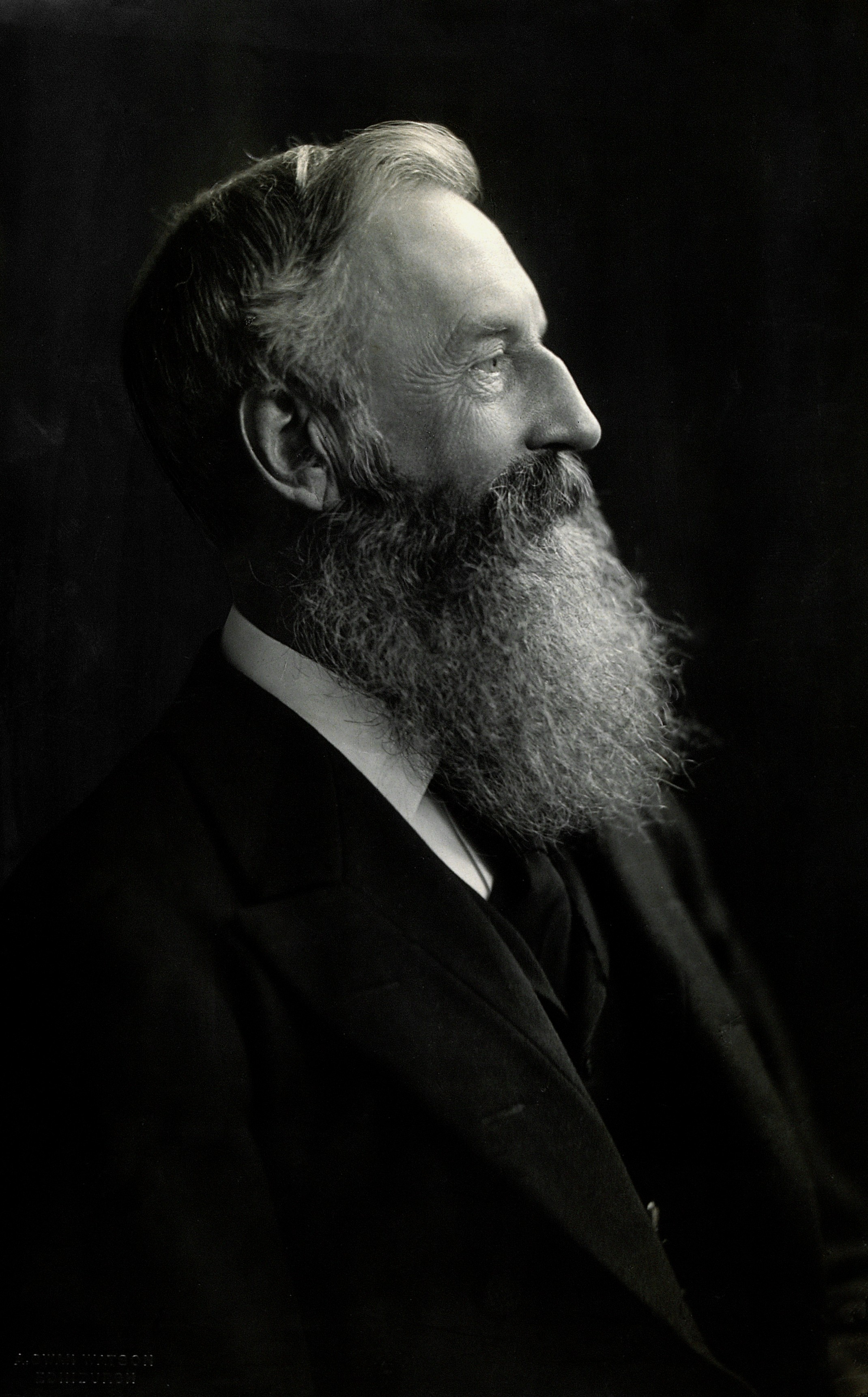
- Photograph by A. Swan Watson. Credit Wellcome Library
- Born: 18 August 1839; Edinburgh, Scotland
- Died: 24 August 1899 (aged 60); Kinloch, Isle of Skye, Scotland
- Education: University of Edinburgh
- Occupation: Surgeon
- Known for: Early use of electricity in surgery; president of the Royal College of Surgeons of Edinburgh
- Spouse: Jemima Thomson (m. 1866)
- Children: 5
- Medical career
- Institutions: Royal Infirmary of Edinburgh

John Duncan, LLD FRCSEd FRSE (18 August 1839 — 24 August 1899) was a Scottish surgeon best known for his surgical teaching at the University of Edinburgh and the Edinburgh Extramural School of Medicine. He was a pioneer of the use of electricity in surgery both for surgical cautery and for tumour necrosis. On the death of his father James Duncan in 1866 he became a director of the major drug manufacturer Duncan Flockhart & Co, which had been founded by his grandfather, also John Duncan (b 1780). He served as President of the Royal College of Surgeons of Edinburgh 1889 to 1891.

== Early life ==
He was born in Edinburgh, the son of Dr James Duncan and his wife Margaret Balfour (1819-1895), then residing at 7 Dundas Street. After schooling at the Royal High School in Edinburgh he studied at the Arts Faculty of the University of Edinburgh.Having graduated MA in 1858 he then transferred to the Faculty of Medicine graduating MD in 1862 with a thesis on paraplegia. He went on to become house surgeon to Professor James Syme in the Royal Infirmary of Edinburgh. He then spent two years in continental Europe studying surgery in Berlin, Vienna and Paris.

A younger John Duncan

== Surgical career ==
He was elected a Fellow of the Royal College of Surgeons of Edinburgh (FRCSEd) in 1864. On his father's death in 1866 he inherited his father's house at 12 Heriot Row and also a large part of his father's general practice, one of the largest in Edinburgh. Intent on a career in surgery he left general practice to devote himself to full-time surgical practice. From 1865 he demonstrated anatomy under Dr Peter Handyside in the Extramural School of Medicine and then taught anatomy and surgery at the university under Professor John Goodsir. He began to teach surgery at the Extramural School in 1871, where he developed a reputation as an excellent teacher, attracting large numbers of students to his classes. From 1875 he was assistant surgeon at the Royal Infirmary of Edinburgh being promoted to senior surgeon in 1887. He also served on the Board of Managers for the Infirmary. In 1890 Dr Henry Alexis Thomson worked with him as his assistant.[8] He retired as a surgeon in 1895, that being the usual practice at the time.

He wrote and lectured on the use of electricity in surgery and was a pioneer of the use of surgical cautery and the use of electrical current to downsize and necrotise vascular tumours.

He was an unsuccessful applicant in 1888 for the chair of surgery at the University of Edinburgh, along with Joseph Bell and Patrick Heron Watson. The successful candidate was John Chiene.

In 1870 he was elected a Fellow of the Royal Society of Edinburgh, his proposer being John Hutton Balfour. In 1870 he was also elected a member of the Aesculapian Club. He was awarded the honorary degree of LLD by the University of St Andrews.

His Edinburgh home was 8 Ainslie Place on the Moray Estate in the west end of Edinburgh's New Town.

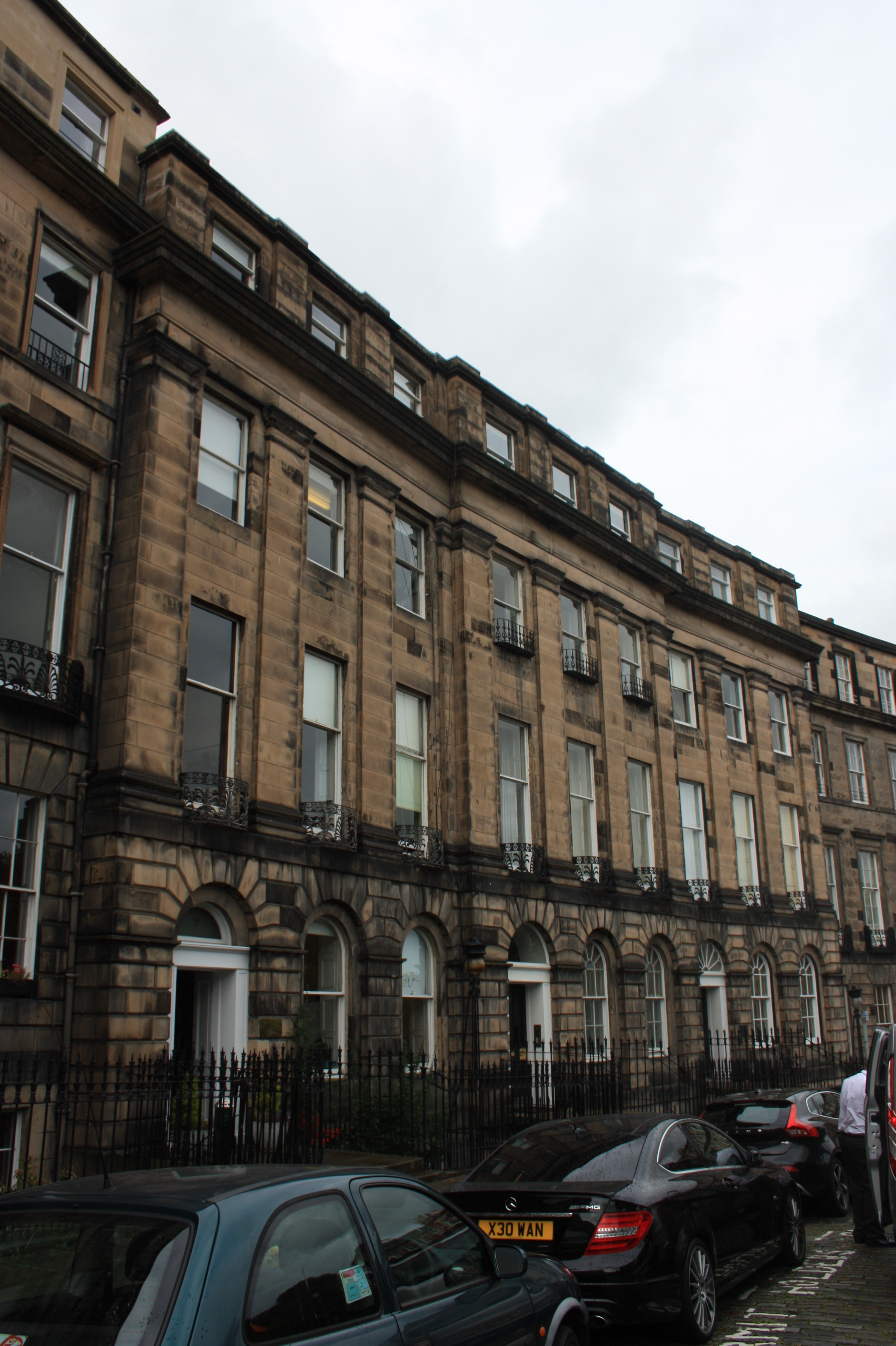
7,8,9 Ainslie Place, Edinburgh

== Death ==
He died at Kinloch Lodge on the Isle of Skye on 24 August 1899, a few days after his 60th birthday and is buried in the Dean Cemetery, Edinburgh.

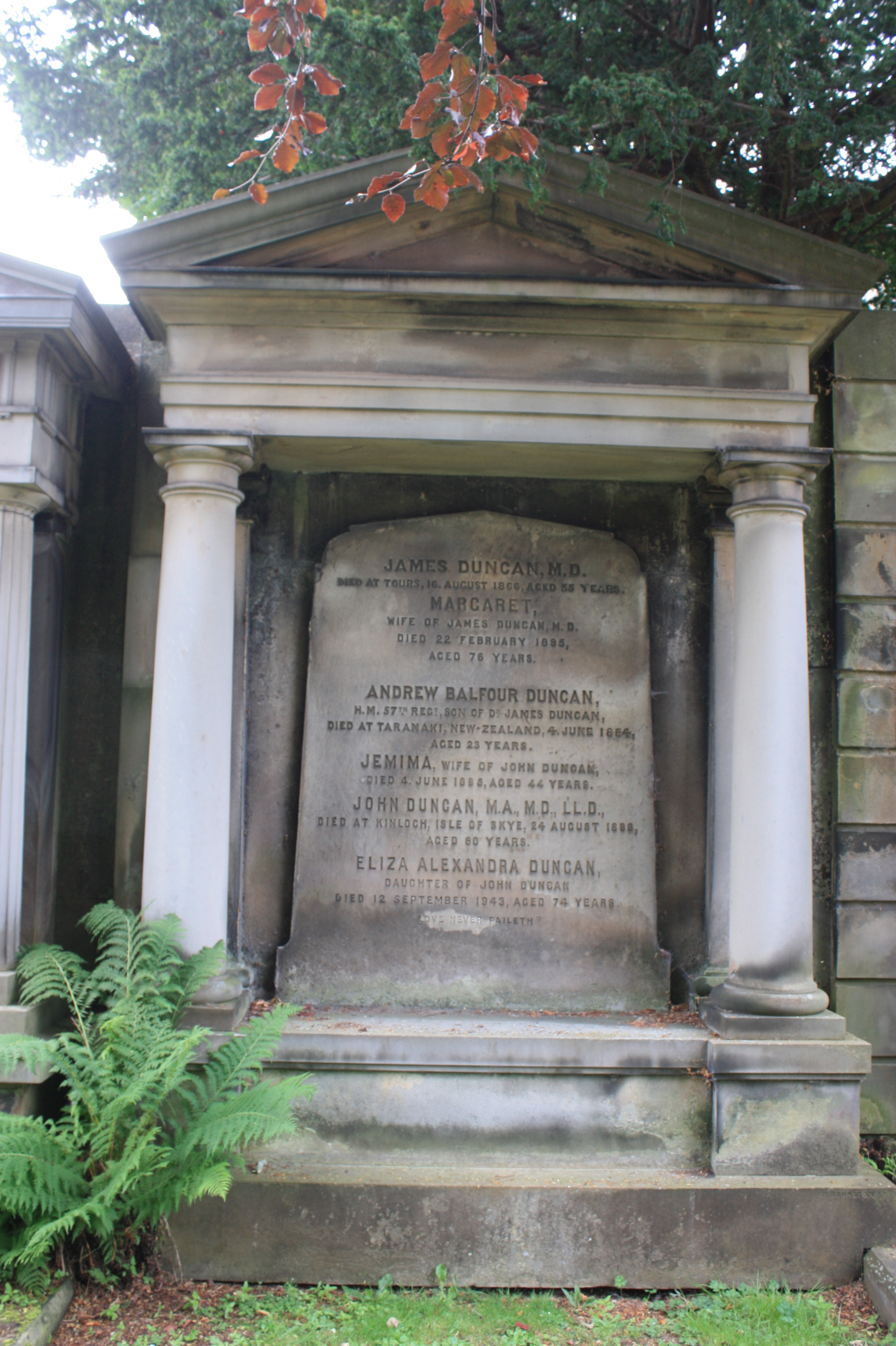
The Duncan grave in Dean Cemetery, Edinburgh

== Family ==
His grandfather John Duncan (b 1780) founded the drug manufacturing firm Duncan, Flockhart & Co, which would later supply chloroform to James Young Simpson. His father James Duncan (1810-1886) inherited the company, becoming a director in addition to pursuing a career as a surgeon in Edinburgh. John Duncan married Jemima Thomson (1841-1885) in 1866 and they had five children: James Duncan (1867-1942), Eliza Alexandra Duncan (1868-1943), Margaret Duncan (1870-1941), Mary Elizabeth Morrison Duncan (b 1872) and Ethel Graham Weir Duncan (1877-1947).

One of his nephews was William James Stuart (1874-1959), who was President of the Royal College of Surgeons of Edinburgh from 1937 to 1939

== Selected bibliography ==
On the Surgical Applications of Electricity: Introduction to a Course of Lectures on Systematic Surgery. Edinb Med J. 1872 Dec; 18(6): 504–521.

Observations on the Surgical Diseases of the Vascular System. Edinb Med J. 1885 Nov; 31(5): 401–411.

Observations on Contemporary French Surgery. Edinb Med J. 1865 May; 10(11): 998–1013.
