= George Wallington Grabham =

Doctor, health administrator (1836–1912)

George Wallington Grabham (1 September 1836–23 July 1912) was a New Zealand medical doctor and health administrator.

== Life ==
Grabham was born in Rochford, Essex, England on 1 September 1836. He was one of at least eleven children born to Sarah (née Fry) and John Grabham. He had at least four sisters including the education reformer Elizabeth Surr. He and three of his brothers went into medicine including Michael Comport Grabham who worked on Madeira.

He was trained in London gaining his MB in 1865 and MD in 1867. He worked at the Bradford Infirmary, the Surrey County Asylum and as the superintendent of the Earlswood Idiot Asylum at Redhill, Surrey from 1870 until 1882. In 1882 he came to New Zealand to take up the position of inspector of hospitals and inspector of lunatic asylums, succeeding Frederick Skae who had died in office. He was the author of the Hospitals and Charitable Institutions Act 1885 recommending the establishment of local control of hospitals by boards or hospital and charitable aid boards as they were known at the time.

During his four years in New Zealand he travelled extensively through the country visiting hospitals and asylums and scrutinising care, maintenance and management. He recommended that some small hospitals be closed but the government, bowing to parochial pressures, did not accept all his recommendations.

In 1886 Grabham returned to England resuming medical practice in Bradford and Witham, Essex.

Grabham married Mary Elizabeth Illingworth in 1863 and they had one son, Arthur Illingworth Grabham. After she died he married his second wife Constance Ethel Joseph Crane in 1894 and they had one son also named George Wallington Grabham.

Grabham died in Essex on 23 July 1912.
