= John Sibbald =

Scottish physician and botanist

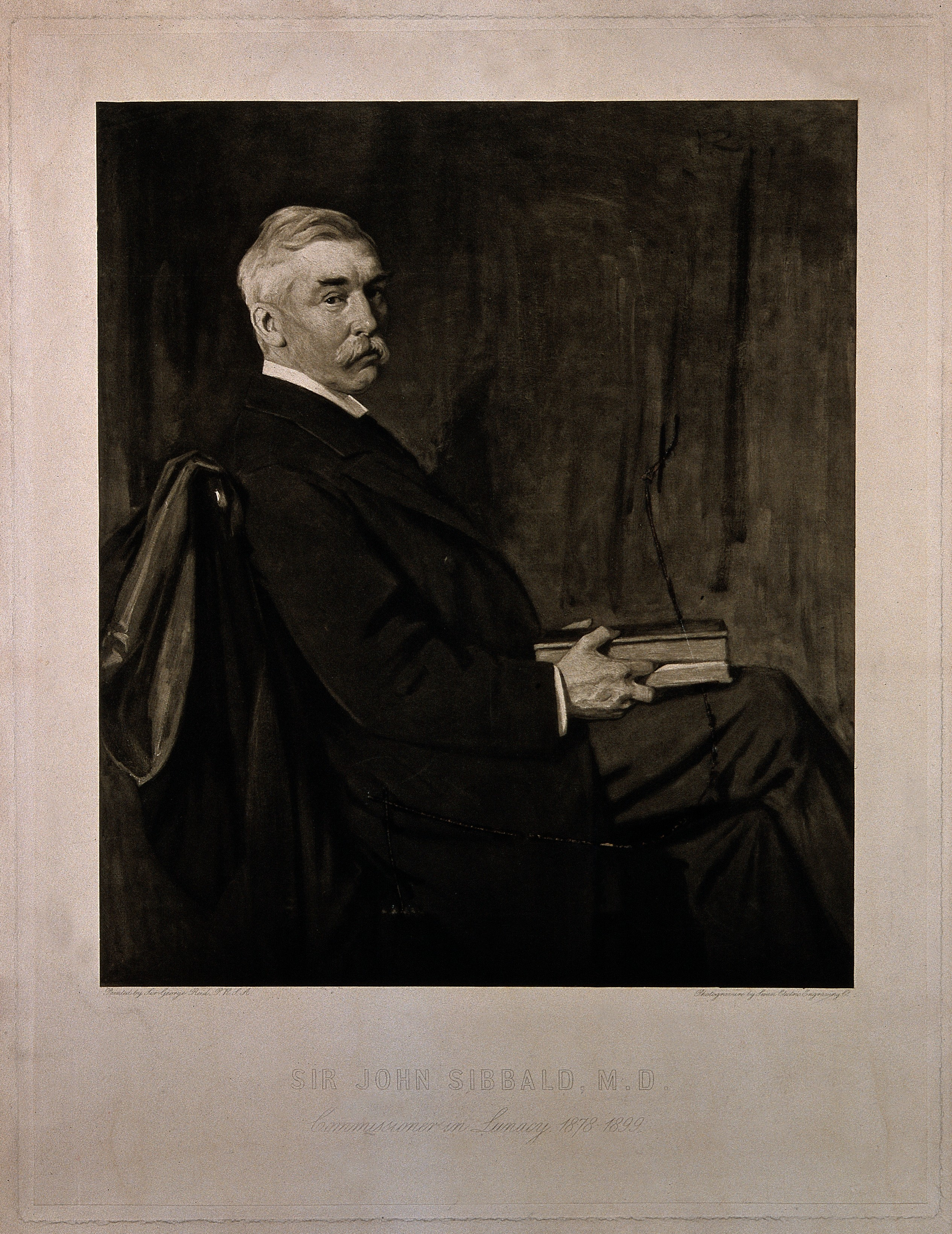
Sir John Sibbald

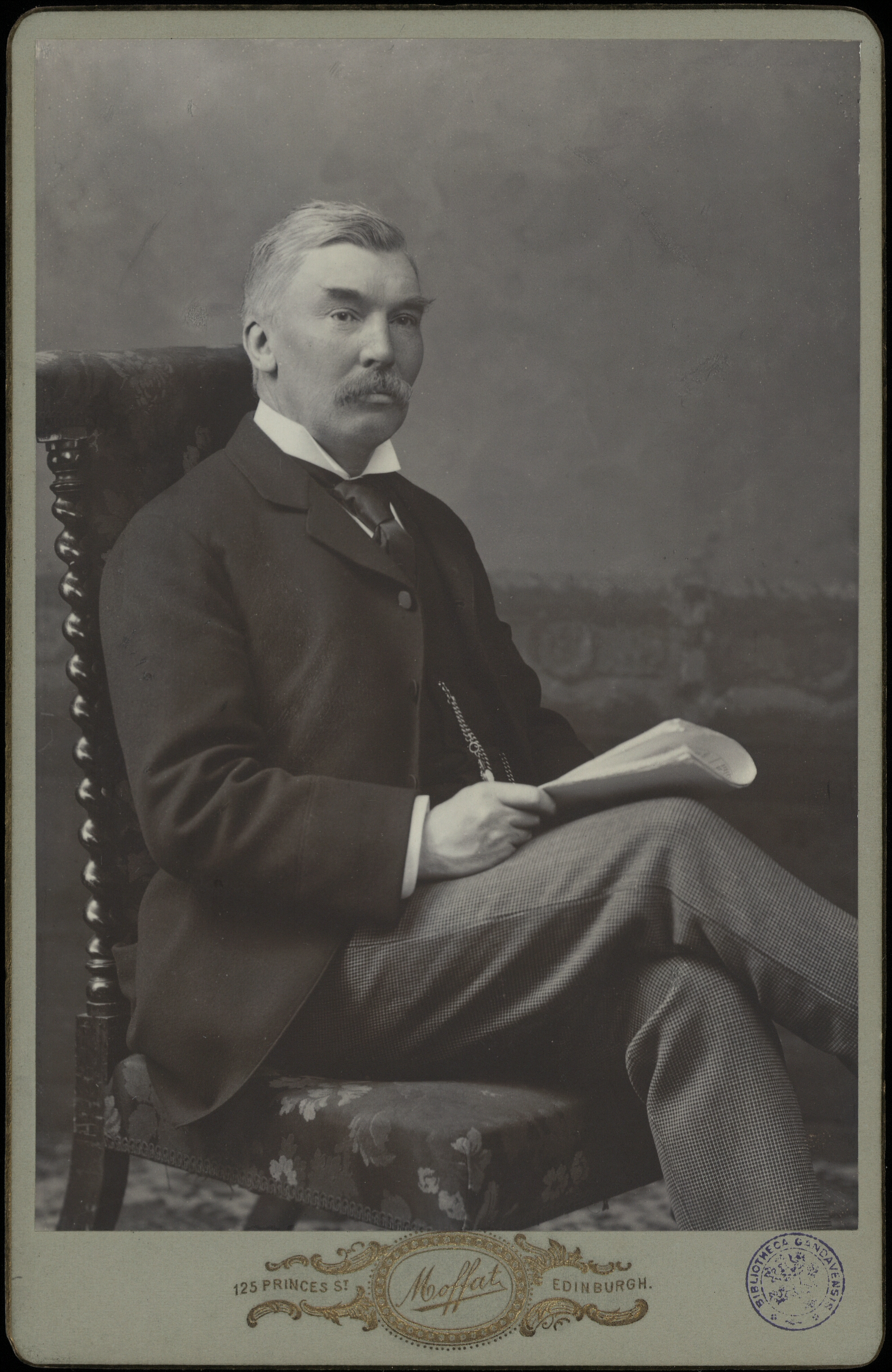
Sibbald (1880s)

Sir John Sibbald FRSE FBSE (24 June 1833 – 20 April 1905) was a 19th-century Scottish physician and amateur botanist. In 1855/56, aged 22, he served as president of the Royal Medical Society.

== Life ==
He was born at 106 Lauriston Place, Edinburgh on 24 June 1833 the son of Jane Graham (1807–1875), from Clonmel, Ireland and William Sibbald (1799–1877).

He was educated at Merchiston Castle School then studied medicine at the University of Edinburgh. His first position was as House Surgeon at Perth Infirmary. He then did postgraduate studies in Paris. Returning to the UK he was assistant to Sir Richard Quain at Brompton Hospital. He obtained his doctorate (MD) from the University of Edinburgh in 1854.

From 1862 to 1870 he was living in Lochgilphead as medical superintendent of Argyll District Asylum. In 1870 he returned to Edinburgh to become deputy superintendent of the Royal Edinburgh Hospital under Dr David Skae. At this time he lived at 16 Dalrymple Crescent in the Grange district.

In 1872 he was elected a Fellow of the Royal Society of Edinburgh. Ironically, this for his contributions to botany rather than medicine. His proposer was John Hutton Balfour. In 1893 he was elected a member of the Aesculapian Club.

From 1879 to 1899 he was Commissioner of Lunacy for Scotland. He was knighted by Queen Victoria in 1899 for his contributions to medicine. He was granted a coat of arms as a Knight Bachelor in 1901 with the motto "Sursum Specto".

He died of throat cancer at home 18 Great King Street, Edinburgh on 20 April 1905.

== Family ==
In 1864, he married Sarah Jane Phelan (b. 1841) daughter of Bernard Paul Phelan of Clonmel (thought to be a second cousin). They had six children.

== Publications ==
- Insanity in its Public Aspect (1877)
- Plans of Modern Asylums (1898)
- Suicide Statistics in Scotland (1900)
