= David Skae =

Scottish physician

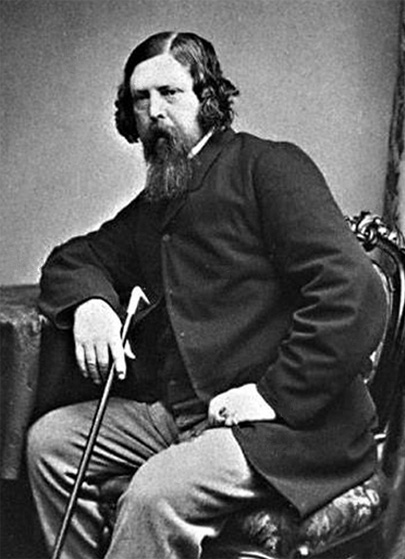
David Skae

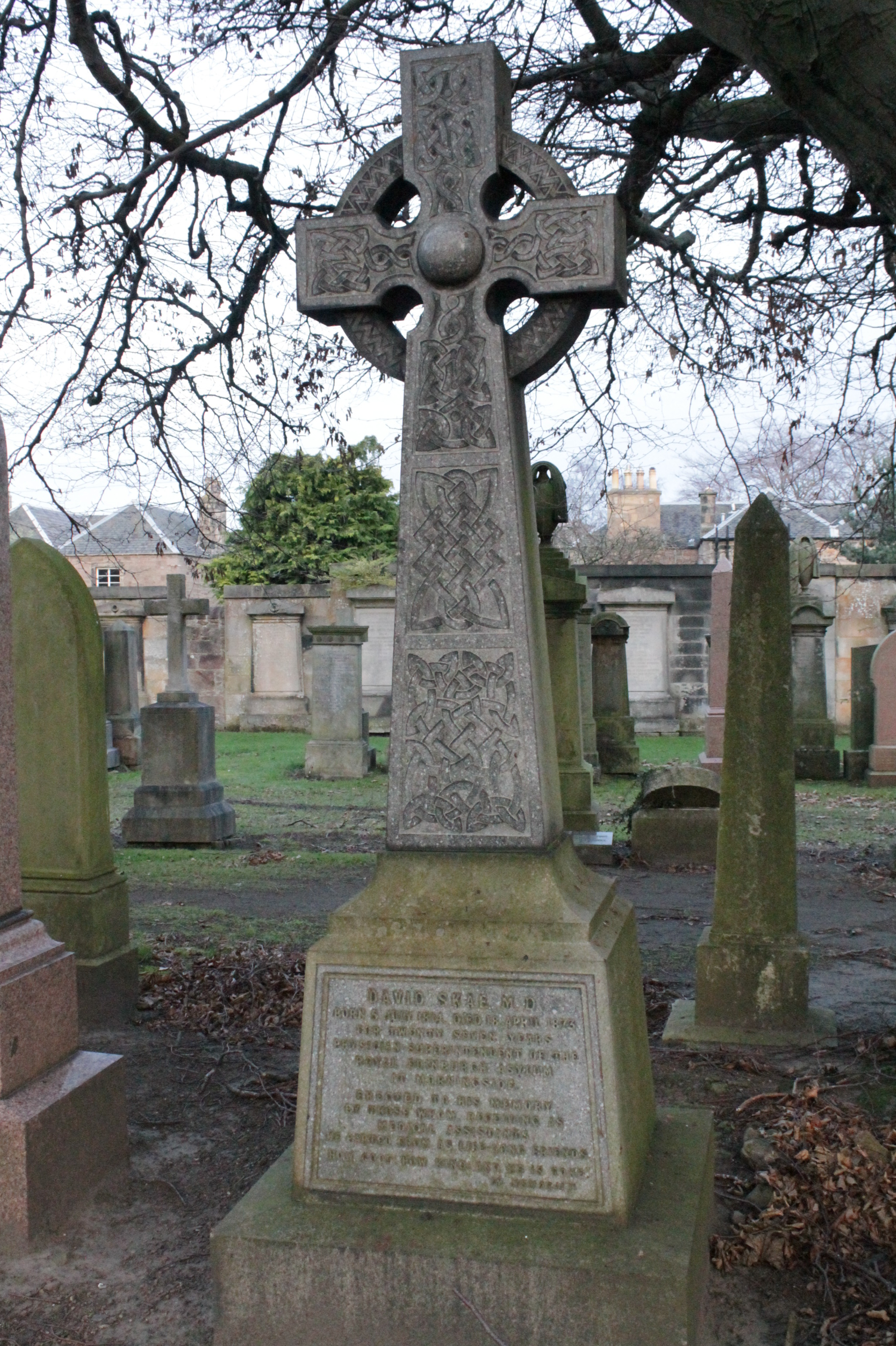
The grave of David Skae, Grange Cemetery

David Skae MD, FRCSEd (5 July 1814 – 18 April 1873) was a Scottish physician specialising in psychological medicine. He has been described as the founder of the Edinburgh School of Psychiatry and several of his assistants and pupils went on to become leading psychiatrists throughout the British Isles.

== Life ==
David Skae was born at 5 Elder Street in Edinburgh the son of David Skae, an architect and builder, and his wife, Helen Lothian. Both parents died whilst David was a child. He was educated by his maternal uncle, the Rev. William Lothian, at St Andrews. At the age of fourteen Skae began his university career, studying liberal arts at the University of St Andrews. At sixteen years of age he left St Andrews to take up a post as a clerk in a lawyer's office in Edinburgh. Shortly thereafter he enrolled as a medical student and in 1835 he qualified as a Licentiate of the Royal College of Surgeons of Edinburgh (LRCSEd). In the following year he was awarded Fellowship of the College (FRCSEd). In 1836 he began to teach in the Edinburgh Extramural School of Medicine and his lectures on medical jurisprudence soon became popular. After delivering fourteen courses of lectures, he began to teach anatomy at the Extramural School where his colleagues included James Young Simpson, Professor James Spence, and William Fergusson. In 1842, St Andrews University awarded him a Doctorate of Medicine.

Meanwhile in 1836 Skae filled the office of surgeon at the Lock Hospital, and wrote several original papers on syphilis. He made insanity his special study, approaching it from the point of view of a student of nervous and mental physiology. In 1846 he obtained the appointment of physician superintendent of the Royal Edinburgh Asylum at Morningside, and held the post till his death, twenty-seven years later. During his tenure of office the institution doubled in size, and he attracted a succession of gifted assistant physicians. From 1853 and up until a few years before his death, he lectured on insanity for medical students in the wards of the asylum. A number of his lectures (some of the very earliest of their kind ever given in Britain) have been collected and are today held within the archives of the Royal College of Physicians of Edinburgh. From 1870 he was assisted by Dr (later Sir) John Sibbald.

In 1873 he was nominated Morisonian lecturer on insanity at the RCPE; but he did not live to complete his term of office.

He died at his official residence at Tipperlinn House in Morningside, Edinburgh, of oesophageal cancer, on 18 April of that year. He is buried in Grange Cemetery in south Edinburgh. The grave stands on the east side of the main eastern path.

== Family ==
He had married Sarah Macpherson, daughter of Major Macpherson of Ayr, and they had children.

His children included Dr Frederick Skae (1842-1881) also an expert in mental health who became the inspector of asylum in New Zealand.

== Works ==
Skae published papers on 'The Treatment of Dipsomaniacs' in 1858, and on 'The Legal Relations of Insanity' (1861 and 1867). His major work was the 'Classification of the Various Forms of Insanity on a Rational and Practical Basis.' He made this topic the subject of an address which he delivered at the Royal College of Physicians, London, on the occasion of his occupying the presidential chair of the Association of Medical Officers of Asylums (9 July 1863); and he further developed it in the Morisonian lectures on insanity, 1873. These lectures were completed and published posthumously by his pupil and successor, Thomas Smith Clouston. Skae's classification is founded upon what he called the 'Natural History of Insanity.' Instead of separating the insane into groups of maniacs, melancholiacs, and so on, Skae proposed that classification should be based on the underlying bodily condition of the patient—puerperal mania, traumatic mania, and so on. Skae's classification was not generally adopted. His definition of insanity was "a disease of the brain affecting the mind".
