= Frederick Skae =

Frederick William Adolphus Skae (14 May 1842– 25 June 1881) was a Scottish born New Zealand psychiatrist and health administrator.

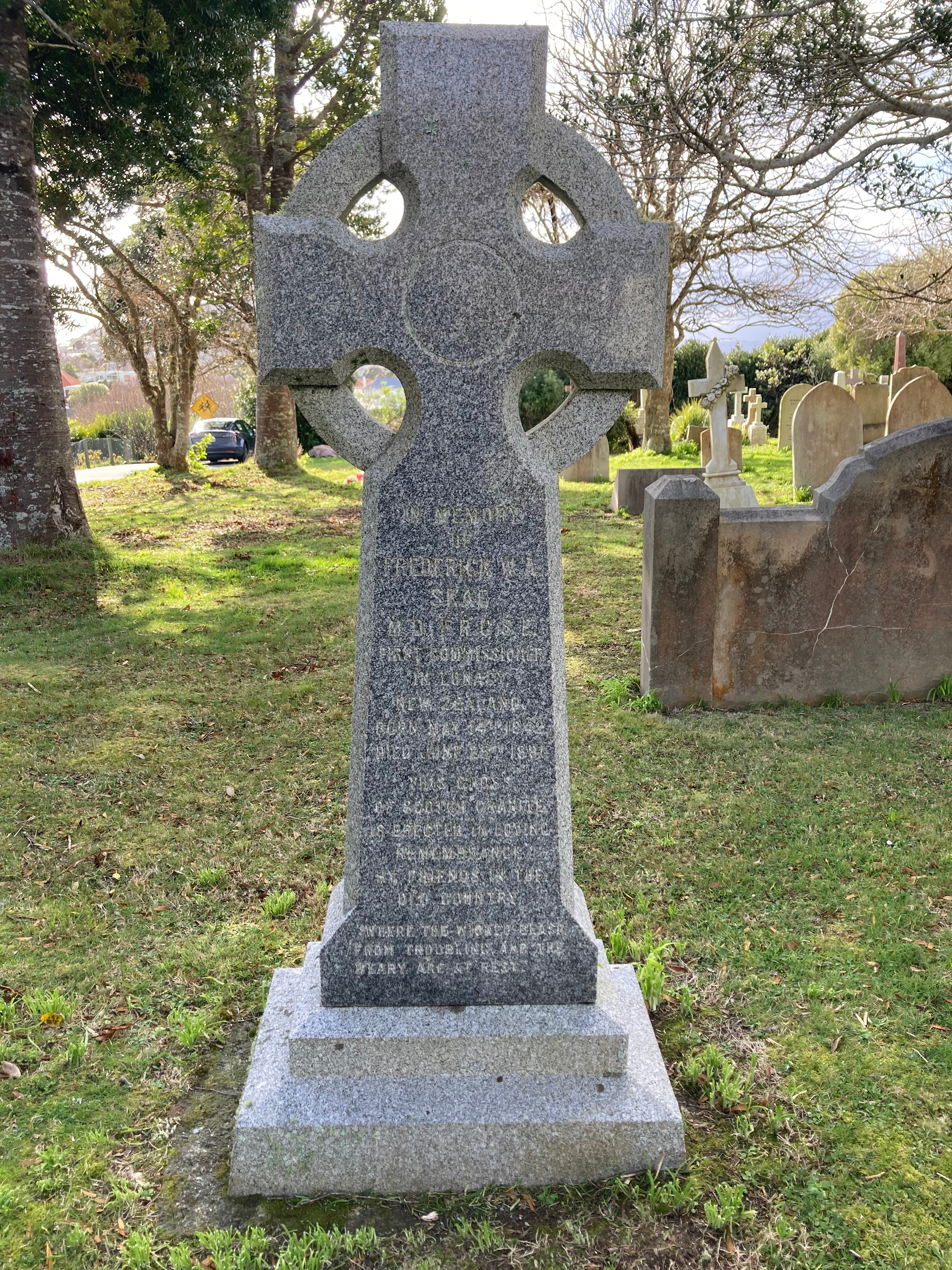
Skae's grave, made of Scottish granite, in churchyard of St Mary's Anglican Church, Kārori, Wellington

Skae was born in Edinburgh, Midlothian, Scotland in 1842, the third son of Dr David Skae who was physician to the Morningside Asylum in Edinburgh. He studied medicine in Edinburgh, graduating with an MD from the University of St Andrews. From 1864 to 1865 he was president of the Royal Medical Society in Edinburgh. After assisting his father he became medical superintendent of the Bellsdyke Asylum in Larbert, Stirlingshire in 1869.

In 1871 a parliamentary commission in New Zealand recommended that a British doctor be appointed to head asylums. After several years delay the government appointed Skae to the position. He emigrated to New Zealand in 1876 to take up the position of inspector of asylums. In 1880 he also became inspector of hospitals and charitable institutions.

During Skae's time at Larbert he had adhered to the prevailing attitude that mental health patients were incurable; chronic patients received little treatment, institutionalisation became the norm and there were never enough beds to meet the demand. However in Scotland, under the provisions of the Poor Law, some patients could be sent to infirmaries and workhouses which relieved overcrowding of asylums.

Skae visited the eight asylums in New Zealand and his reports on the state of asylums were unpopular with the government which did not provide adequate funding. He found extensive overcrowding and his solutions were to try and limit admissions and increase the numbers of patients who could be discharged; as there was no equivalent of the Poor Law workhouses to fall back on Skae proposed boarding out. These solutions had limited success. He also proposed that asylums be removed from suburban areas which lead to asylums being established at Upper Hutt (and later Porirua), and Seacliff.

Asylums had been run by lay superintendent although Skae advocated that they be run by doctors. Medical superintendents were appointed at Sunnyside and at the Dunedin asylum. An exception was made at the Mount View Asylum in Wellington where Skae recommended a layman, James Whitelaw, be made superintendent in 1877. After rumours of ill-treatment, including restraint, a Royal Commission was set up in 1881 to examine the charges and Whitelaw was dismissed. Skae, who was overworked, was also held to be ultimately responsible and was dismissed with six months notice. He was vilified in the press. He died before the six months had elapsed from "mental shock and erysipelas". He was succeeded by George Grabham.

In 1866 he married Henrietta Traill and they had nine children. After her husband's death Henrietta returned to Scotland with their children. Two of their sons also became doctors.
