= James Duncan (surgeon) =

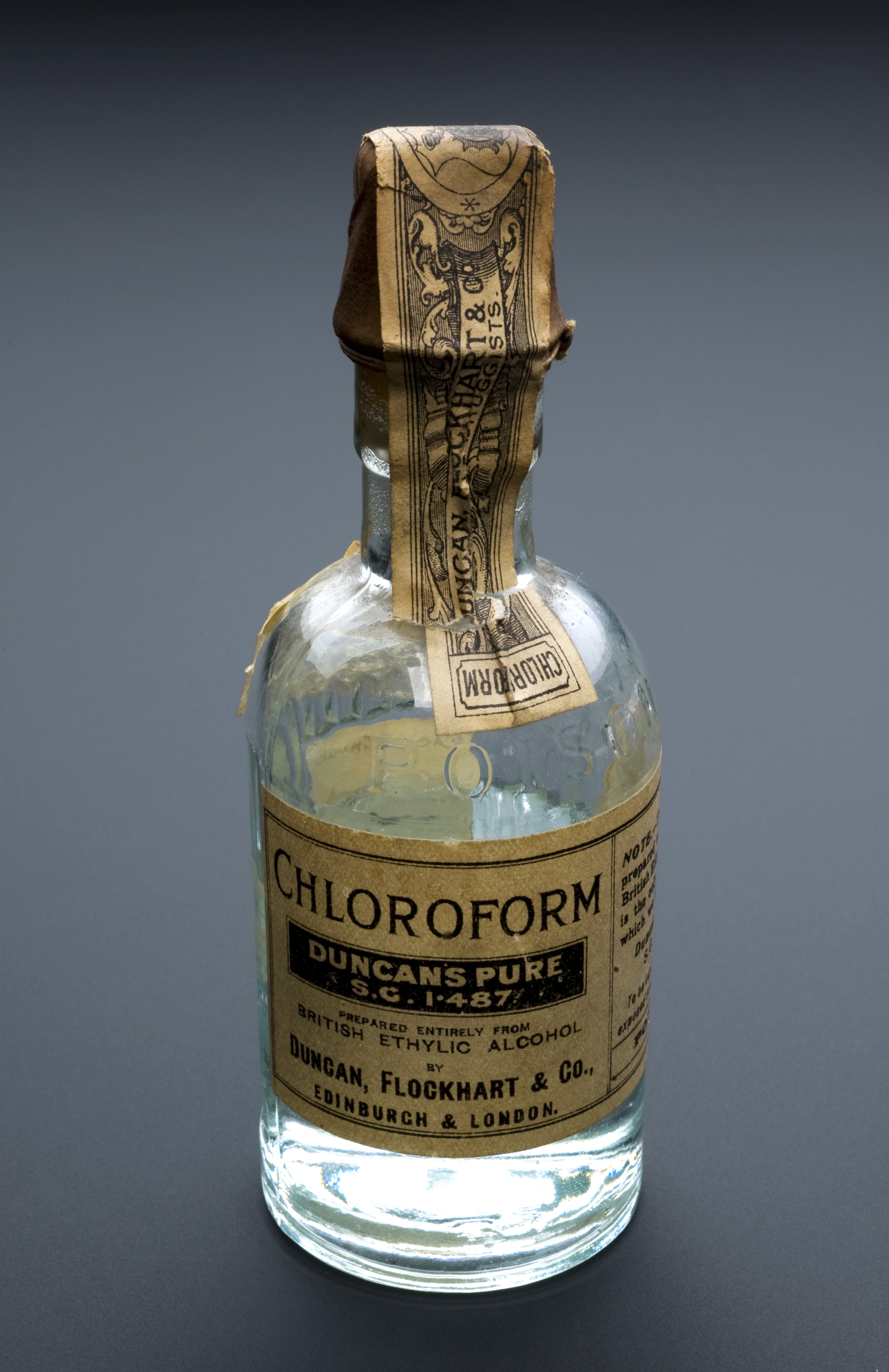
Bottle of Duncan’s chloroform

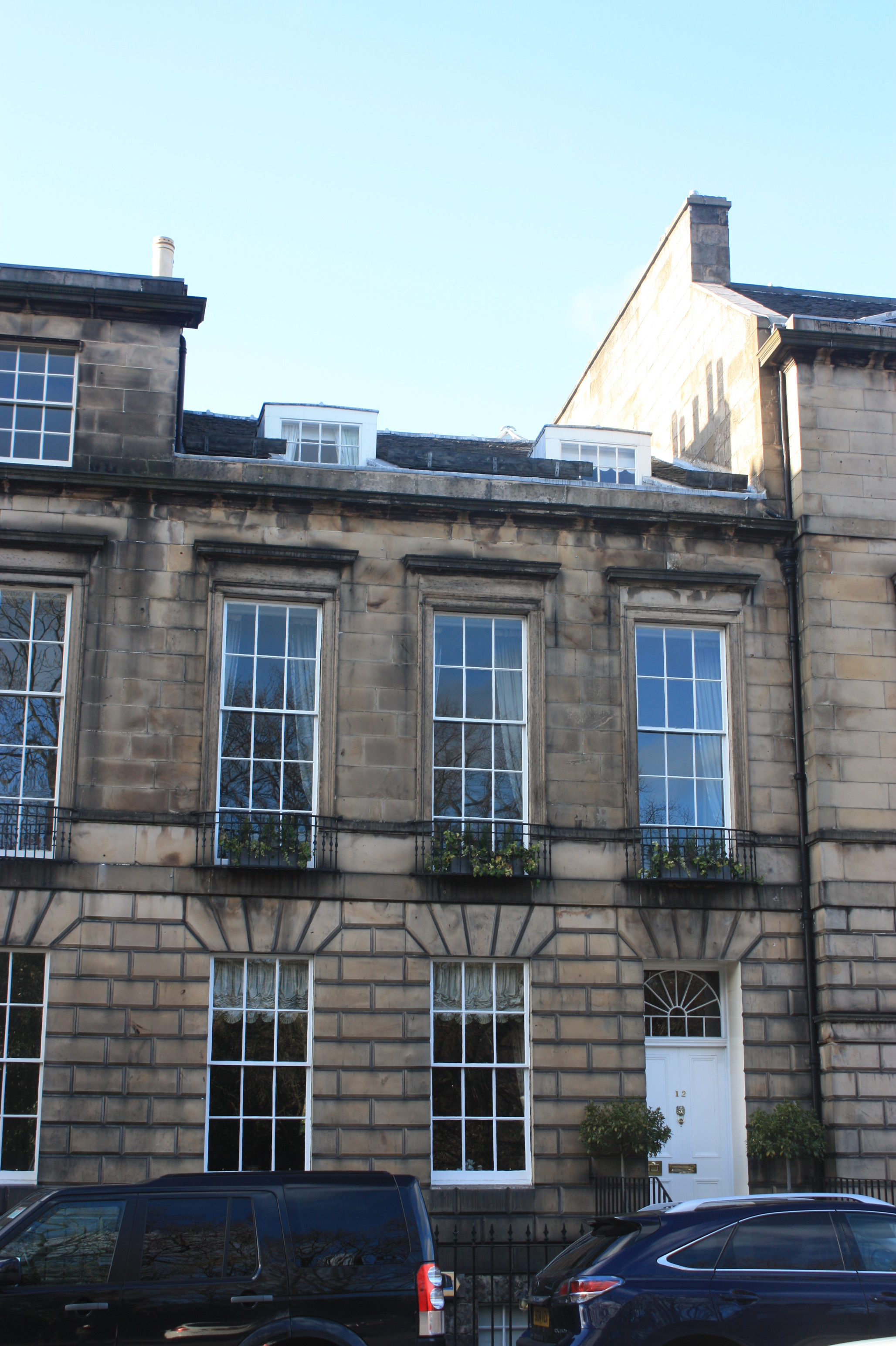
Duncan's house at 12 Heriot Row, Edinburgh

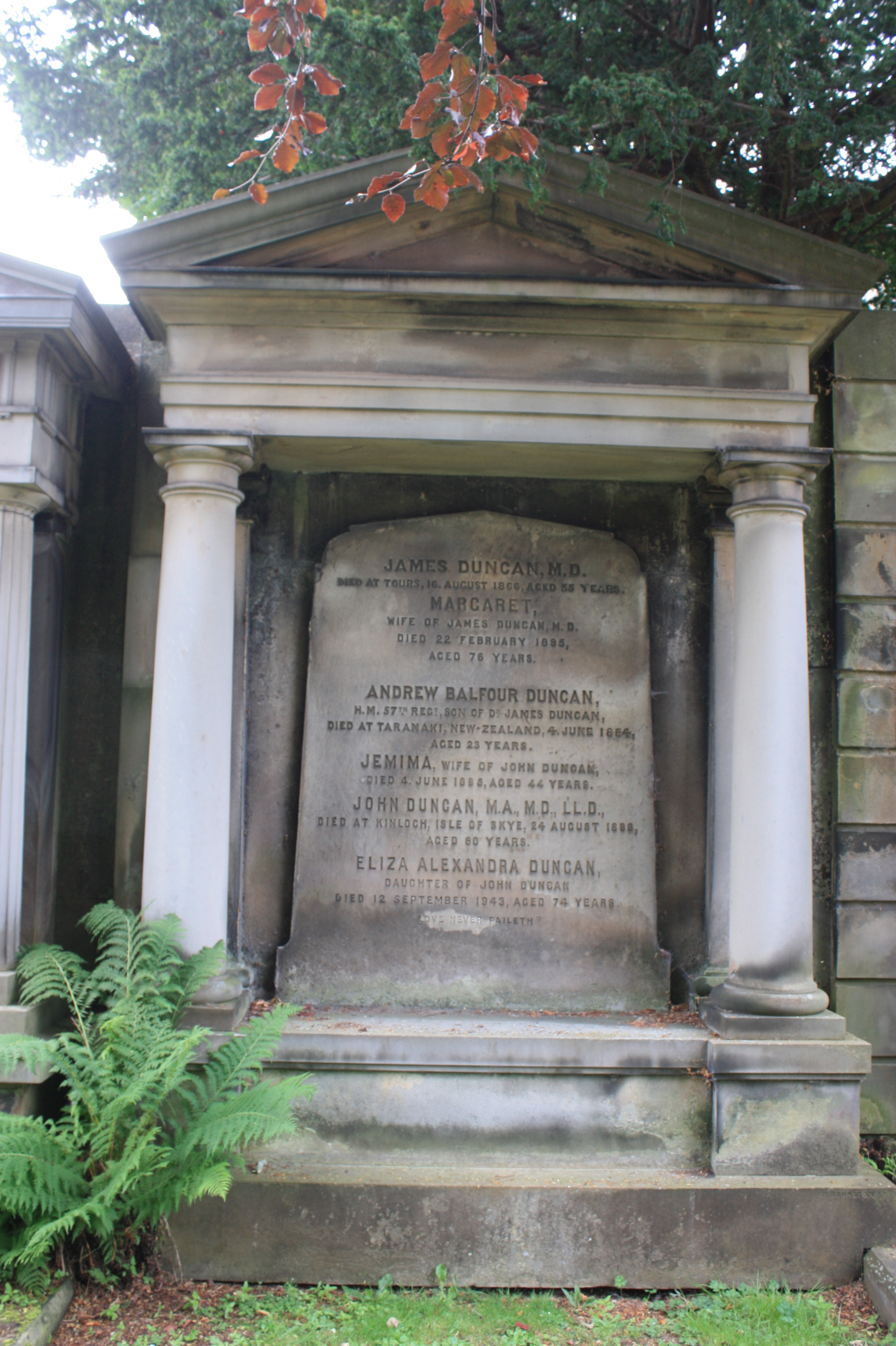
The Duncan grave in Dean Cemetery, Edinburgh

James Duncan FRSE FRCS FRCSE (2 November 1810 – 16 August 1866) was a Scottish surgeon and manufacturing chemist responsible for much of the British supply of chloroform in the mid-19th century. From 1839 to 1866 he was Director of Duncan Flockhart & Co one of Scotland’s largest chemical manufacturers.

== Life ==
He was born in Perth on 2 November 1810, the son of John Duncan (b. 1780) founder of Duncan Flockhart & Co. and his wife, Elizabeth Morison.

He was educated at Perth Academy then sent to the High School in Edinburgh to be educated. In 1833 his father’s company moved from Perth to Edinburgh, with premises at 52 North Bridge with the family living at 1 Blenheim Place at the top of Leith Walk.

Meanwhile Duncan was completing his medical studies at the University of Edinburgh, graduating with an MD in 1834. He was taught surgery by Robert Liston. Due to his rich father his postgraduate studies leading to his MD included studies in France, Germany, Austria and Italy.

Upon his father's retirement, he became the new owner and director of Duncan Flockhart & Co. The company had a shop on North Bridge in the city centre and an office and manufacturing plant at 1 Constitution Street in Leith under the name of Duncan Flockhart & Powell. William Flockhart, the other partner, lived at 4 Gayfield Place at the top of Leith Walk. The third partner of the Leith firm, Frederick W. Powell lived at 29 Bernard Street in Leith, close to the factory. His father John Duncan died in 1871.

He purchased a house a 7 Dundas Street in the New Town. He was by then already acting as Senior Surgeon to the Edinburgh Royal Infirmary, and also had his own consultancy within the New Town Dispensary. In 1839 the firm began to manufacture lactucarium. With growing profits he moved from Dundas Street to the much larger and grander 12 Heriot Row (only 50m from the Dundas Street house) the Heriot Row house costing him £1900. In 1840 he was elected a member of the Harveian Society of Edinburgh.

From 1847 became the main British manufacturer of chloroform, supplying to surgeons such as Sir James Simpson and dentists such as Francis Brodie Imlach. The firm expanded, building new premises in London and supplied chloroform to the British Army and the Royal Navy.

In 1857 he was elected a Fellow of the Royal Society of Edinburgh his proposer being James David Forbes. In his final years he lived at 12 Heriot Row, in one of the largest and most prestigious houses in the city.

He died of oriental cholera at Tours in France on 16 August 1866 while on a vacation.

His body was returned to Edinburgh for burial in Dean Cemetery. The large, simple tomb lies on the western wall in the section known as "Lords Row". His wife and children lie with him.

== Family ==
He was married to Margaret Balfour (1819-1895) daughter of the surgeon Andrew Balfour. Their son Andrew Balfour Duncan joined the army and died in Taranaki in New Zealand in June 1864 aged 23.

He was father to Dr John Duncan FRSE (1839-1899) President of the Royal College of Surgeons of Edinburgh 1889-1891 and author of Angioma and Other Papers who inherited his Heriot Row property on his death.

His daughter Jessie Duncan married Rev John Stuart, Chaplain in Ordinary to Queen Victoria. Through this marriage James was maternal grandfather to William James Stuart, President of the Royal College of Surgeons of Edinburgh 1937 to 1939.
