= John Stuart (Edinburgh minister) =

Chaplain in Ordinary to Queen Victoria

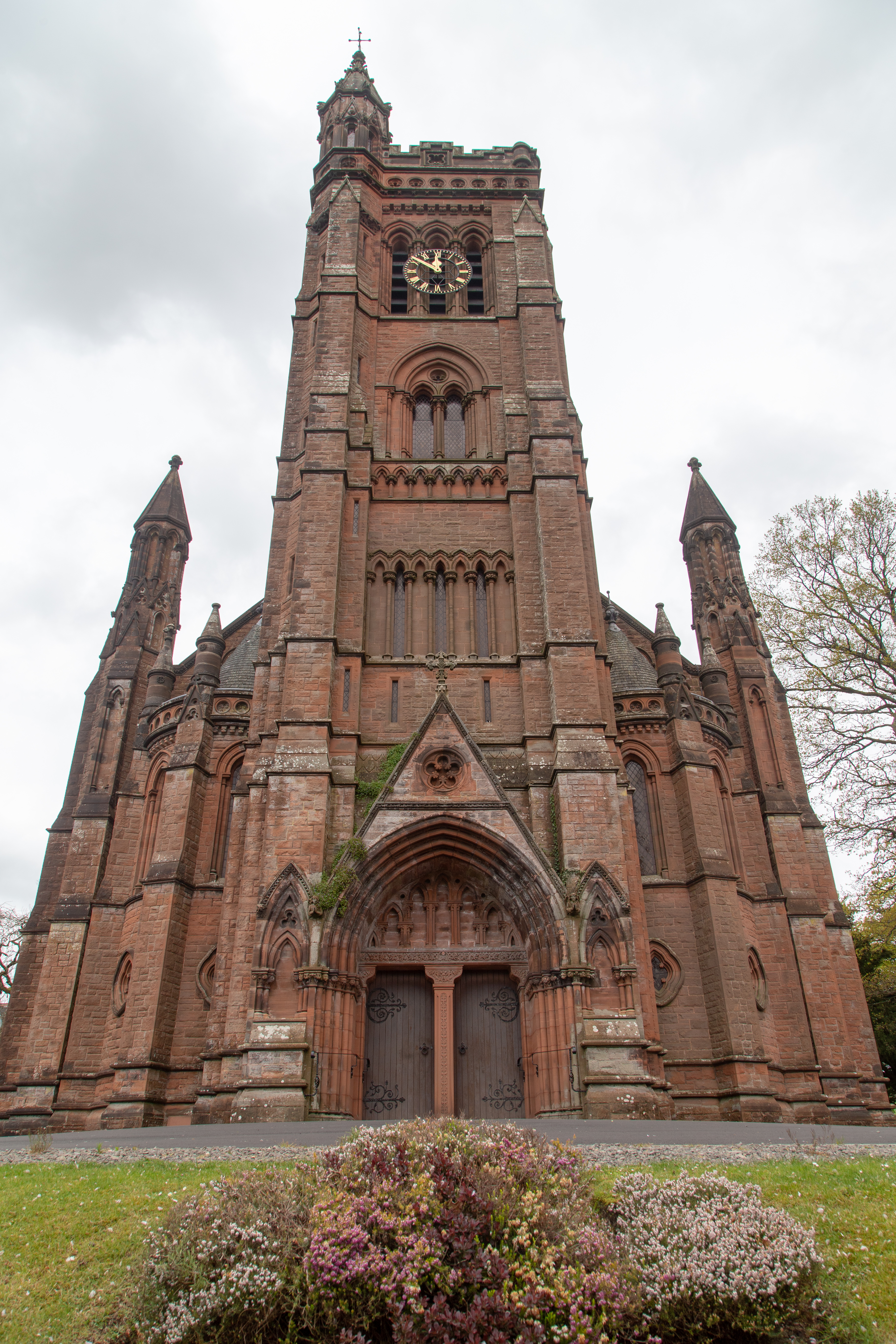
Moffat Parish Church

John Stuart (1819–1888) was a senior Scottish minister in the 19th century who served as Chaplain in Ordinary to Queen Victoria.

== Life ==
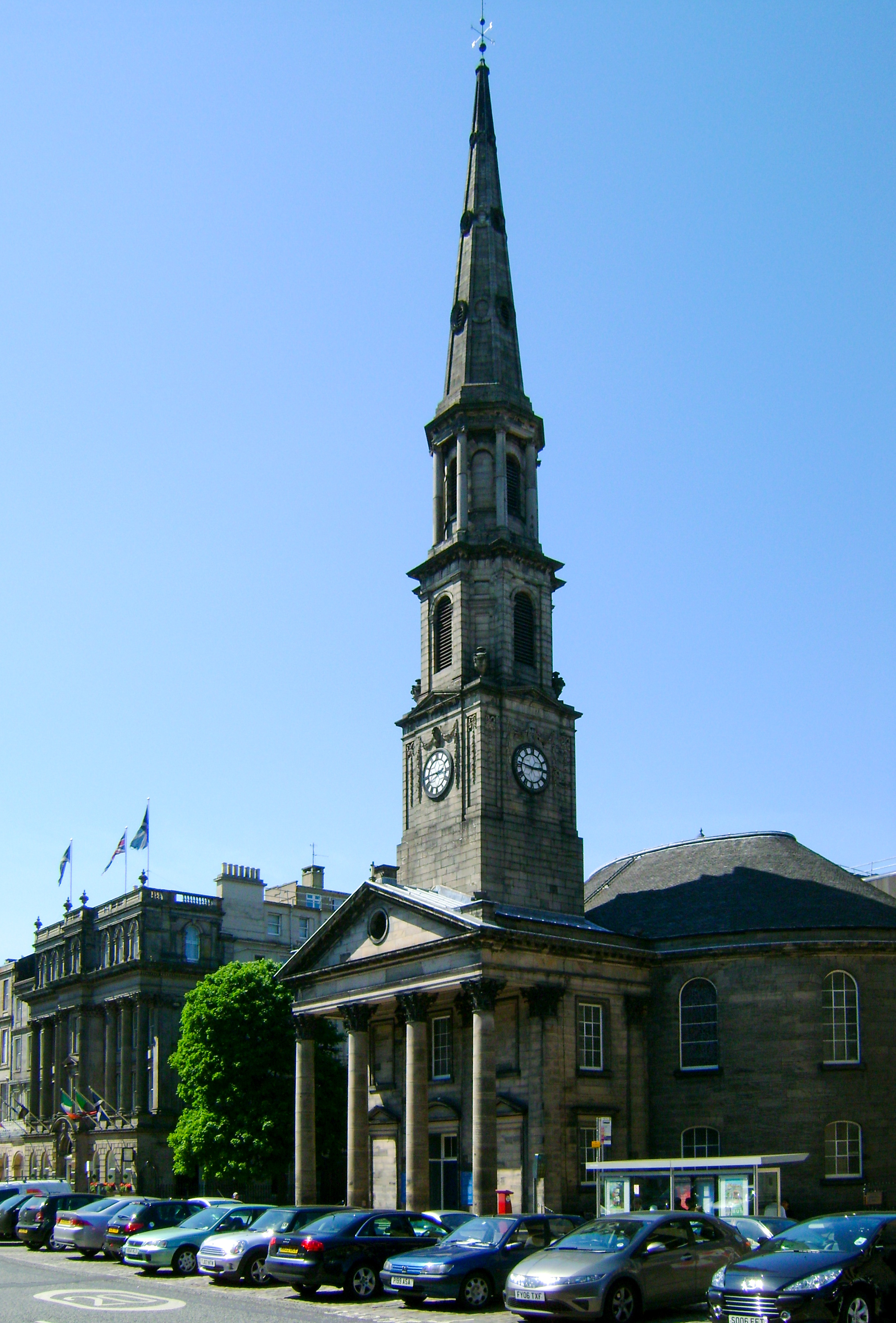
St Andrew's Church in Edinburgh

Stuart was born in Edinburgh in January 1819 the son of Dorothy Miller and her husband, William Stuart an attorney. He was educated at Edinburgh Academy then studied at the University of Edinburgh. In March 1846 he was licensed to preach as a Church of Scotland minister by the Presbytery of Edinburgh. He was ordained a few days later at St George's-in-the-Fields Church in Glasgow. Here he lived at lodgings at 180 Springhill Place.

In November 1848 he translated to Newton-on-Ayr Parish Church but stayed less than a year, moving to Moffat in October 1849. He moved to East Parish in Stirling in 1853 before taking charge of St Andrews Church in central Edinburgh in May 1857 in place of Rev Thomas Clark.

In 1860, he was living at 13 Forth Street in the eastern New Town.

In 1862, Stuart he replaced the late Rev Norman MacLeod as Chaplain in Ordinary in Scotland to Queen Victoria.

He lived his final years at 7 Northumberland Street in the Second New Town.

John Stuart died on 22 August 1888. His position at St Andrew's Church was filled by Rev Arthur Gordon.

== Family ==
He married Jessie Duncan daughter of James Duncan of Duncan & Flockhart. Their children included Margaret Balfour Stuart (1868-1876) who died in childhood, and William James Stuart .
