= Rae Gilchrist =

Scottish cardiologist

Rae Gilchrist CBE FRCPE FRSE FRCP

Physician, Royal Infirmary of Edinburgh
- In office 1939–1964

Personal details
- Born: Andrew Rae Gilchrist; 7 July 1899
- Died: 1 March 1995 (aged 95)
- Occupation: Cardiologist

Andrew Rae Gilchrist (7 July 1899 – 1 March 1995) was a Scottish cardiologist who served as President of the Royal College of Physicians of Edinburgh 1957 to 1960. He was its longest serving Fellow: 1929 to 1995 (66 years). He did extensive work on anti-coagulants. In 1959 he was a co-founder of the British Heart Foundation, a charity raising funds for heart research.

== Life ==
He was born on 7 July 1899, the only son of Catherine Hill and her husband, Rev Andrew Gilchrist (1871–1954). He was born in Holywood, County Down in Northern Ireland. His parents were Scots and he was sent to George Watson's College in Edinburgh for schooling.

At the age of 18 he was conscripted into the Royal Field Artillery and served for the final year of the First World War. He graduated from the University of Edinburgh with a Bachelor of Medicine and Bachelor of Surgery in 1921. He was granted a Doctor of Medicine in 1933. His first job was at Addenbrooke's Hospital in Cambridge then he moved to the Princess Elizabeth Hospital for Children before spending a year at the Rockefeller Hospital in New York. In 1928 he made the first clinical diagnosis and description of myocardial infarction and in 1930 he made the first seven recordings of coronary thrombosis in Europe (published in the Edinburgh Medical Journal). He expressed the opinion that heart attacks were a new disease of the 20th century.

From 1931 he worked as a Consultant at the Edinburgh Royal Infirmary alongside Sir Stanley Davidson and Derrick Dunlop. He was an examiner in all Scottish universities plus Makerere University in East Africa and the University of Baghdad. In 1937 he was elected a Fellow of the Royal Society of Edinburgh. His proposers were Edwin Bramwell, Sir Robert William Philip, Arthur Logan Turner and Sir Sydney Smith.

In 1928 Gilchrist was elected a member of the Harveian Society of Edinburgh and served as President in 1963. In 1954 he was elected a member of the Aesculapian Club.

In 1961 he was made a Commander of the Order of the British Empire (CBE).

He suffered a myocardial infarction in 1965 forcing him to retire.

He died on 1 March 1995.

== Family ==
In 1931 he married Emily Faulds (died 1967). They had one daughter (Dr Jennifer Mary Rae Gilchrist) and one son (Andrew Kirkwood Rae Gilchrist). Following Emily's death he married Elspeth Wrightman in 1975.
