= Alexander Keiller (physician) =

Scottish physician and gynaecologist

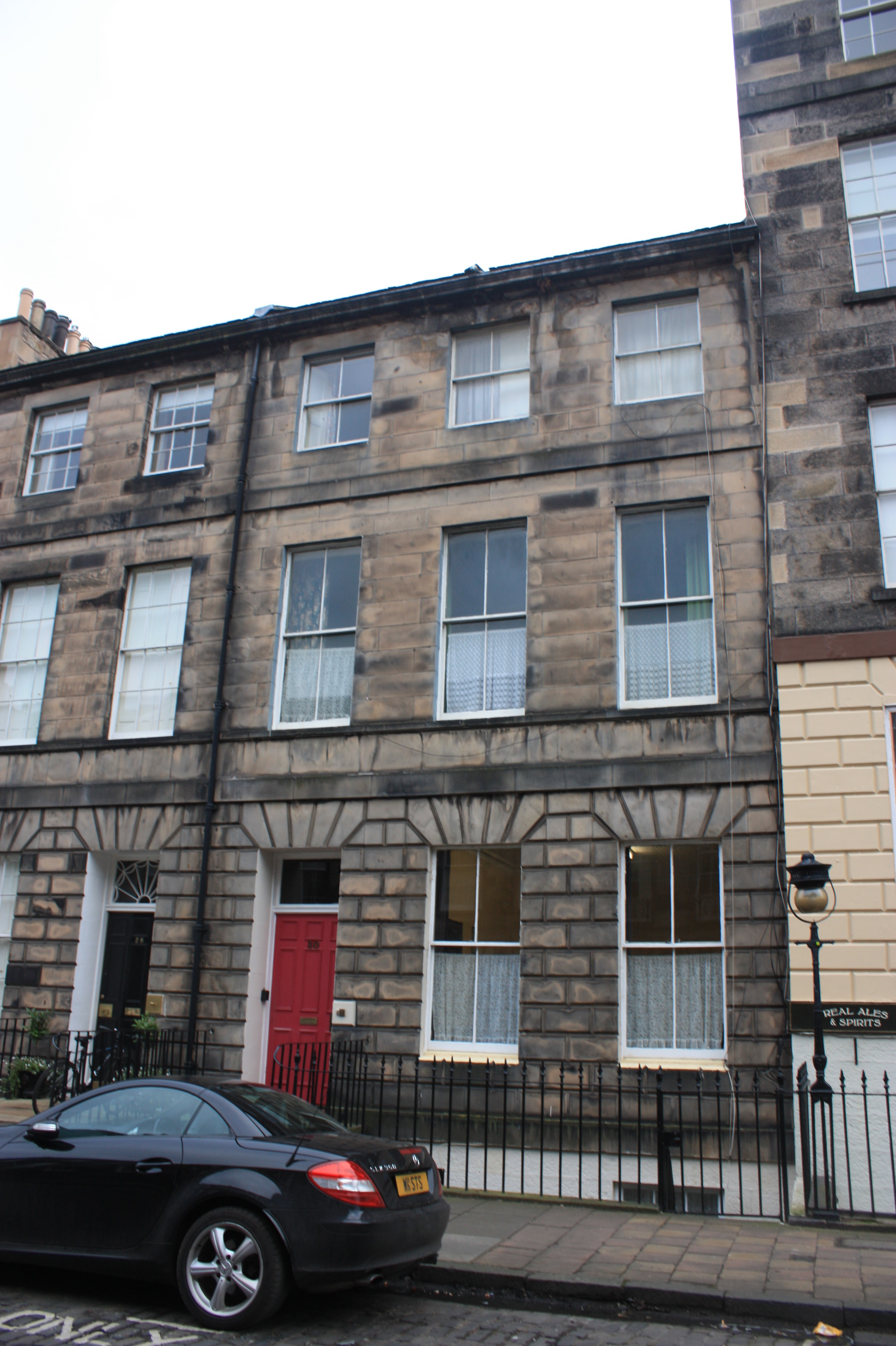
Dr Keiller's house at 30 Northumberland Street, Edinburgh

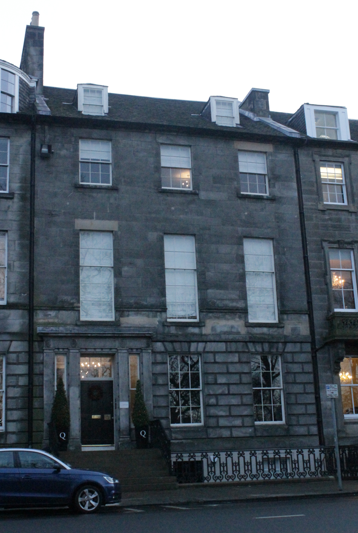
21 Queen Street, Edinburgh

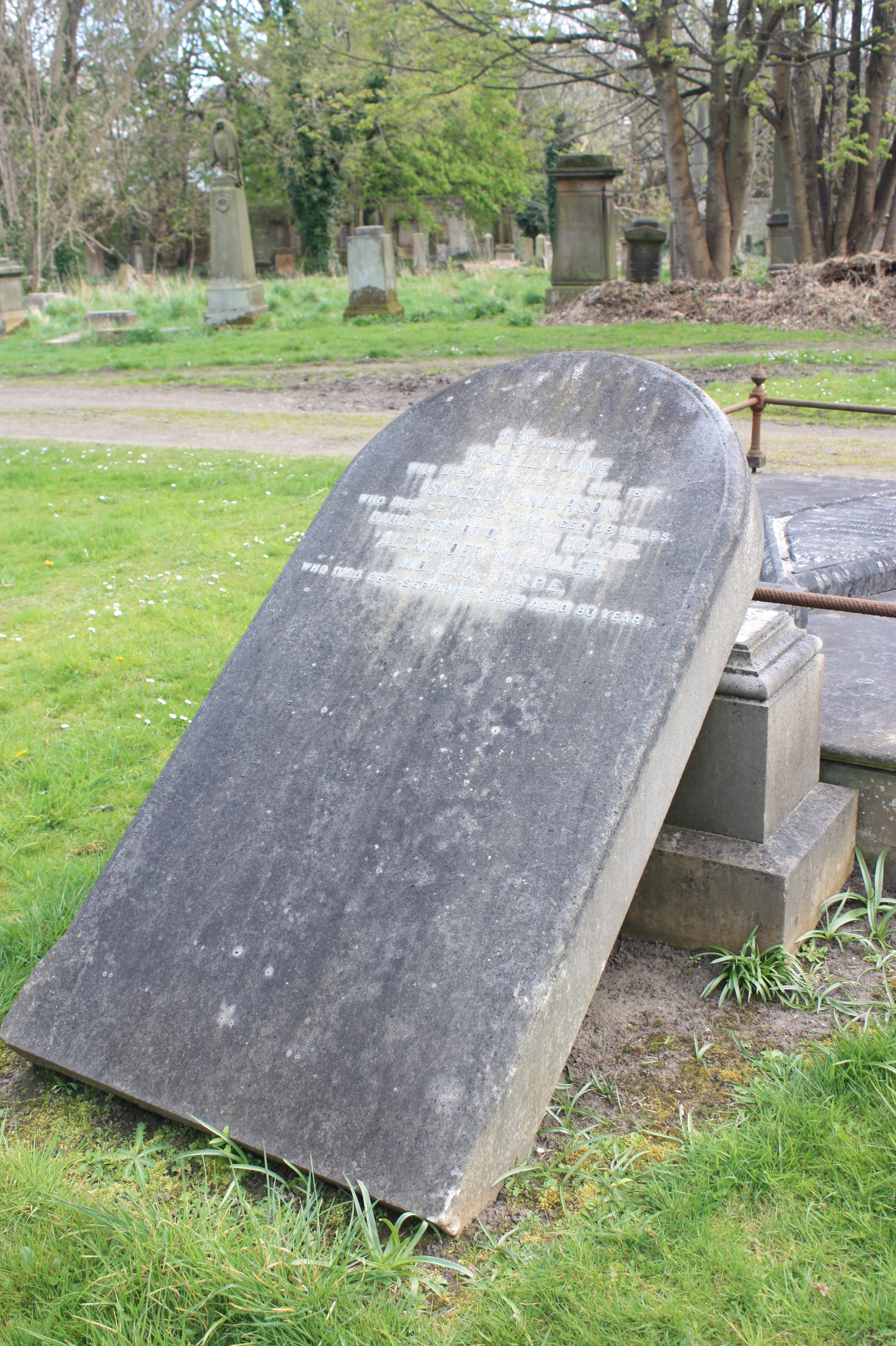
The grave of Alexander Keiller, Warriston Cemetery

Alexander Keiller FRSE LLD (11 November 1811 – 26 September 1892) was a Scottish physician and gynaecologist who served as President of the Royal College of Physicians of Edinburgh 1875–77.

== Life ==
Alexander Keiller was born in Arbroath on 11 November 1811 the fourth child of John Keiller (born 1768), a merchant and his wife, Isabella Anderson.

He qualified LRCSE in 1833, and became a Fellow of the Royal College of Surgeons of Edinburgh shortly afterwards. He graduated MD from the University of .St. Andrews in 1835 and became a Fellow of the Royal College of Physicians of Edinburgh (RCPE) in 1849.

He set up in medical practice in Dundee, but after seven years moved to Edinburgh, where he soon established a large practice, specialising in midwifery and the diseases of women and children. He was active as a lecturer in the Edinburgh Extramural School of Medicine lecturing on midwifery, diseases of children, medicine and medical jurisprudence. He was appointed as ordinary physician at the Royal Infirmary of Edinburgh, later becoming consulting physician . For many years he was also a member of the staff of the Royal Maternity Hospital, the Royal Hospital for Sick Children, and the New Town Dispensary.

In 1852 Keiller was elected a member of the Harveian Society of Edinburgh and served as president in 1884. In 1865 he was elected a Fellow of the Royal Society of Edinburgh his proposer being Thomas Croxen Archer.

He was President of the RCPE from 1875 to 1877. He received an honorary doctorate (LLD) from St Andrews University in 1886.

He lived at 30 Northumberland Street in Edinburgh's Second New Town. In 1890 he was living at 21 Queen Street, Edinburgh.

He died in North Berwick on 26 September 1892. He is buried with his daughters in Warriston Cemetery in the north of Edinburgh. The partly toppled monument lies in the area west of the sealed eastern entrance.

== Family ==
He married Maria Elizabeth Roy in 1846.
