= William James Stuart =

Scottish surgeon (1873–1958)

William James Stuart

William James Stuart CBE PRCSE FRSE (1873-1958) was a 20th-century Scottish surgeon who served as President of the Royal College of Surgeons of Edinburgh from 1937 to 1939. He was affectionately known as Pussy Stuart.

== Life ==
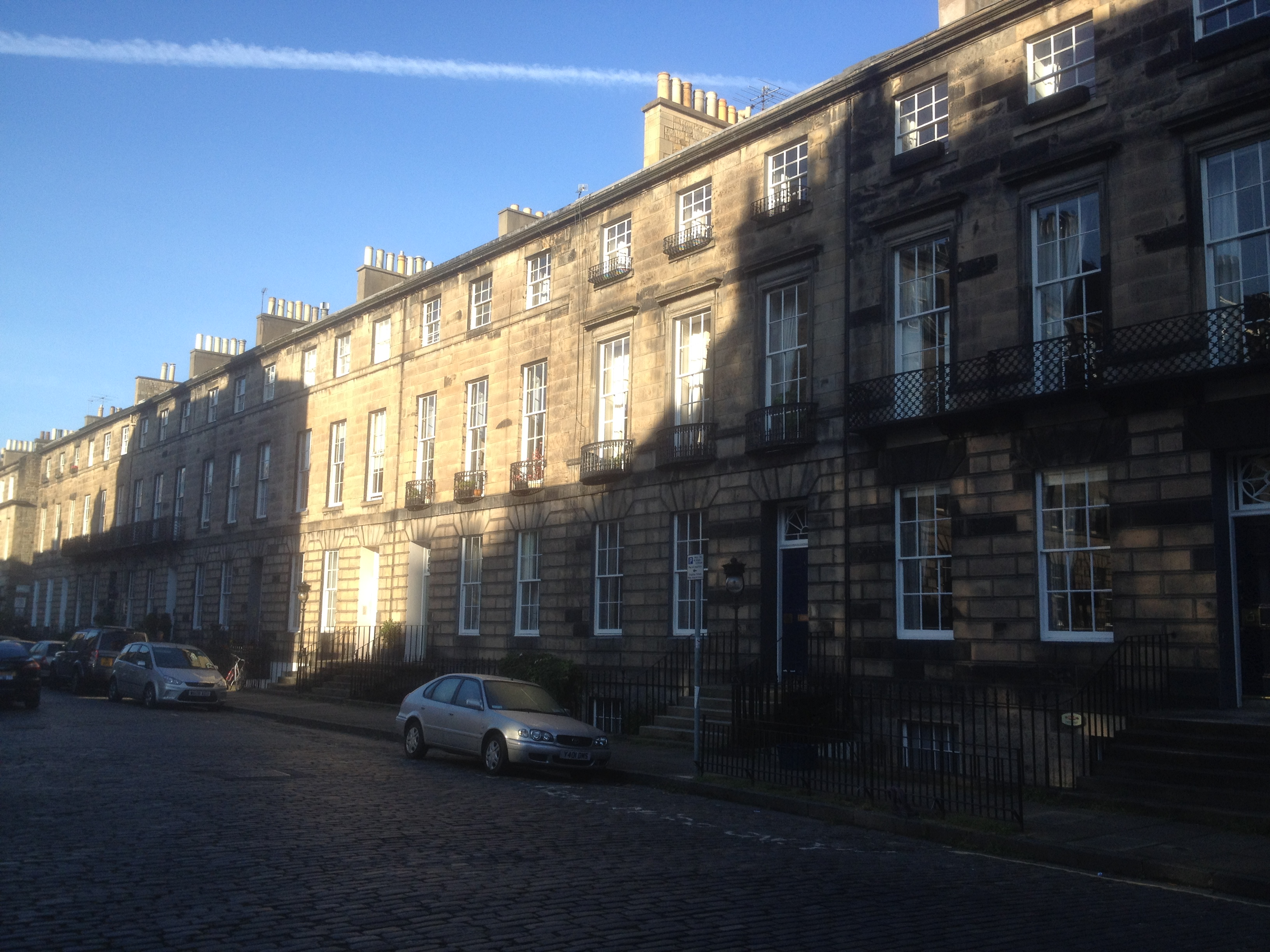
Northumberland Street, Edinburgh

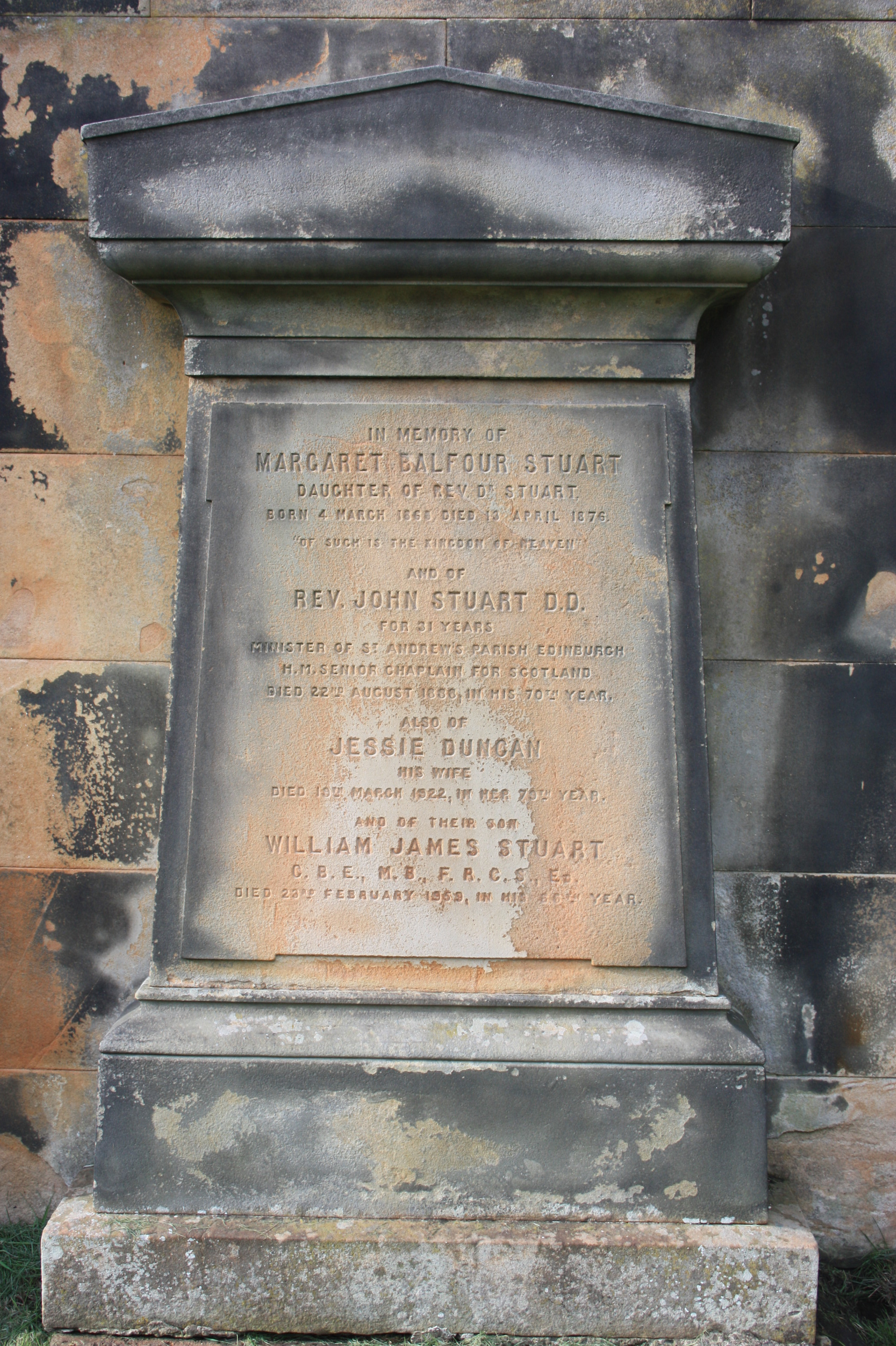
The grave of William James Stuart, Dean Cemetery, Edinburgh

He was born the son of Rev John Stuart DD (1816-1886) minister of St Andrews parish in Edinburgh (and Chaplain in Ordinary to Queen Victoria), and his wife, Jessie Duncan, daughter of Dr John Duncan (an eminent surgeon and founder of the medical chemical company Duncan & Flockhart). The family lived at 7 Northumberland Street, a large terraced Georgian townhouse in Edinburgh's Second New Town. He was educated at Edinburgh Academy close to his family home, then studied medicine at Edinburgh University graduating MB ChB in 1899.

He held various appointments at Edinburgh Royal Infirmary on Lauriston Place and was elected a Fellow of the Royal College of Surgeons of Edinburgh in 1903. In 1906 he was appointed Honorary Assistant Surgeon at the Deaconess Hospital in the south of the city. In 1908 he was given a parallel position at the Royal Infirmary. In the First World War he served as a Major in the Royal Army Medical Corps, serving in Salonica 1916 to 1918. Although going into semi-retirement in 1938 he was brought into full operational use in the Second World War when he was asked to run the surgical wards of Edinburgh Royal Infirmary.

He lived most of his later life at 9 Chester Street in Edinburgh's West End.

In 1904 Stuart was elected a member of the Harveian Society of Edinburgh and served as President in 1936. In 1928 he was elected a member of the Aesculapian Club and served as honorary secretary from 1933 to 1949. He published an official history of the Club in 1949. In 1943 he was elected a Fellow of the Royal Society of Edinburgh. His proposers were Douglas Guthrie, Ernest Wedderburn, James Watt and James Pickering Kendall.

He was created a Commander of the Order of the British Empire (CBE) by King George VI in 1952.

He died in Edinburgh on 23 February 1958. He is buried with his parents in Dean Cemetery in western Edinburgh. The grave lies against the north wall of the original northern extension.

== Positions of Note ==
- President of the Royal College of Surgeons of Edinburgh 1937 to 1939
- President of the Medico-Chirurgical Society of Edinburgh 1944/45
- Member of the Edinburgh Medical Missionary Society
- On the board of the Scottish YMCA
- Executive Member of the Scottish Blood Transfusion Service
- Church Elder at St Andrews Church, Edinburgh

== Hobbies ==
He was a keen sportsman, playing both cricket and rugby and being a reserve for the Scottish International Rugby Team in 1901.
