= William Quiller Orchardson =

Scottish painter (1832–1910)

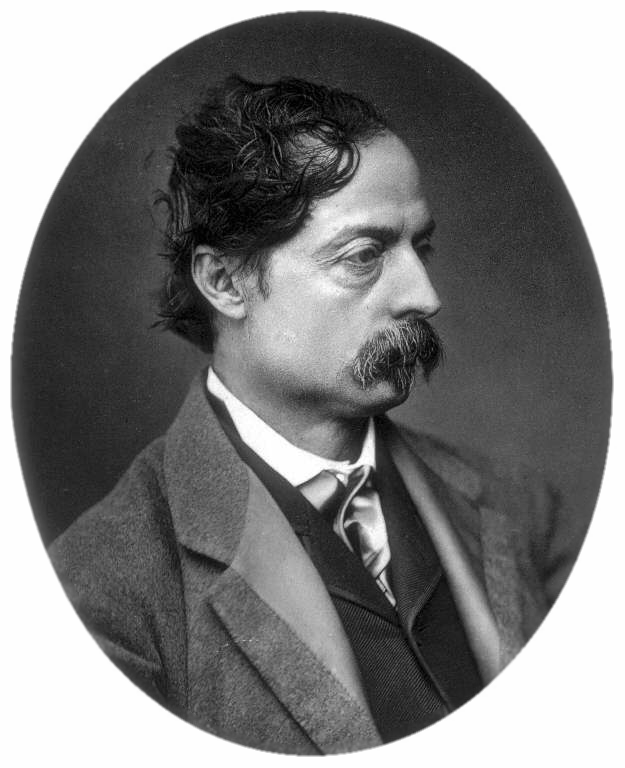
- Portrait from Men of Mark, 1876–1883
- Born: 27 March 1832; Edinburgh, Scotland
- Died: 13 April 1910 (aged 78); London, England
- Spouse: Helen Moxon (m. 1873)

Sir William Quiller Orchardson (27 March 1832 – 13 April 1910) was a Scottish portraitist and painter of domestic and historical subjects who was knighted in June 1907, at the age of 75.

== Early years ==
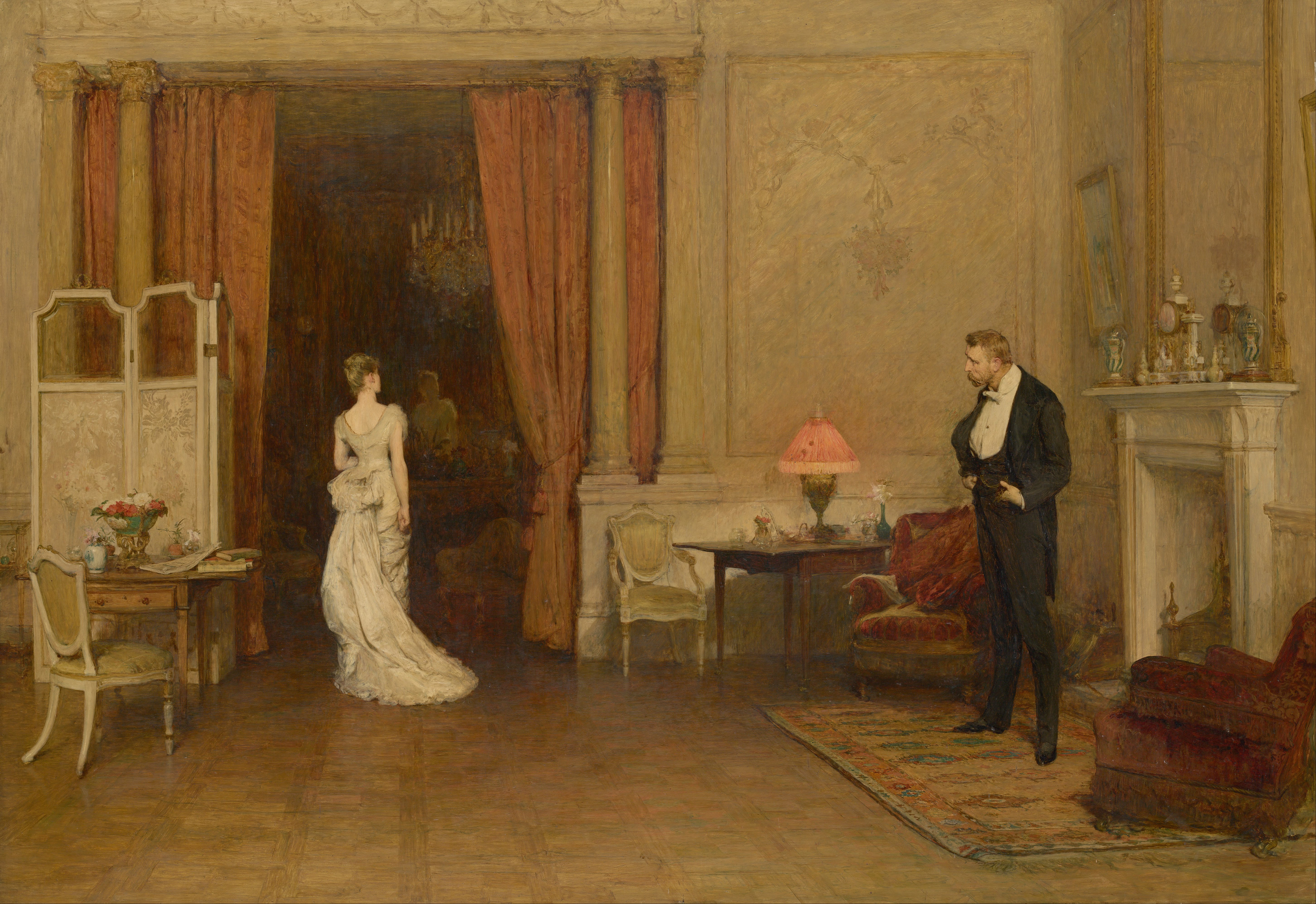
William Quiller Orchardson – The First Cloud

Orchardson was born in Edinburgh, where his father was engaged in business. "Orchardson" is a variation of "Urquhartson", the name of a Highland sept settled on Loch Ness, from which the painter is descended.

At the age of fifteen, Orchardson was sent to Edinburgh's renowned art school, the Trustees' Academy, then under the mastership of Robert Scott Lauder, where he had as fellow-students most of those who afterwards shed lustre on the Scottish school of the second half of the 19th century. As a student, he was not especially precocious or industrious, but his work was distinguished by a peculiar reserve and an unusual determination that his hand should be subdued to his eye, with the result that his early works reach their own ideal as surely as those of his maturity.

By the time he was twenty, Orchardson had mastered the essentials of his art, and had produced at least one picture which might be accepted as representative, a portrait of sculptor John Hutchison.

For the next seven years he worked in Edinburgh, some of his attention being given to a "black and white" style, his practice in which having been partly acquired at a sketch club, which, in addition to Hutchison, included among its members Hugh Cameron, George Hay and William McTaggart.

== Years in London ==
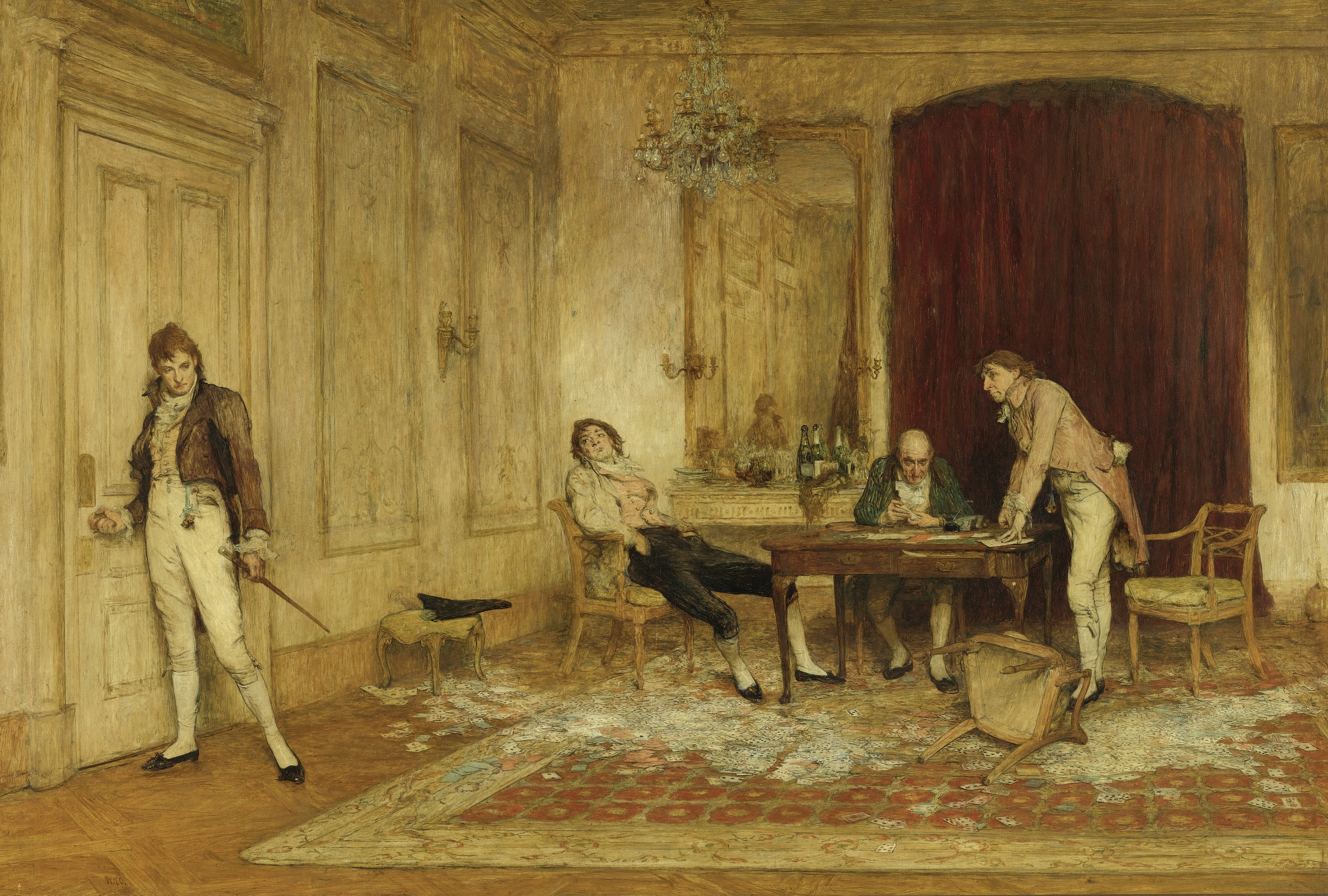
William Quiller Orchardson – Hard Hit

In 1862, at the age of thirty, Orchardson moved to London, and established himself at 37 Fitzroy Square, where he was joined twelve months later by his friend John Pettie. The same house was afterwards inhabited by Ford Madox Brown.

The English public was not immediately attracted to Orchardson's work. It was too quiet to compel attention at the Royal Academy, and Pettie, his junior by four years, stepped before him for a time and became the most readily accepted member of the school. Orchardson confined himself to the simplest themes and designs, to the most reticent schemes of colour. Among his most highly regarded pictures during the first eighteen years after his move to London were The Challenge, Christopher Sly, Queen of the Swords, Conditional Neutrality, Hard Hit – perhaps the best of all – and, within his own family, portraits of his wife and her father, Charles Moxon. In all these, good judgment and a refined imagination were united to a restrained but consummate technical dexterity. During these years he made a few drawings on wood, turning to account his early facility in this mode.

== Later life ==
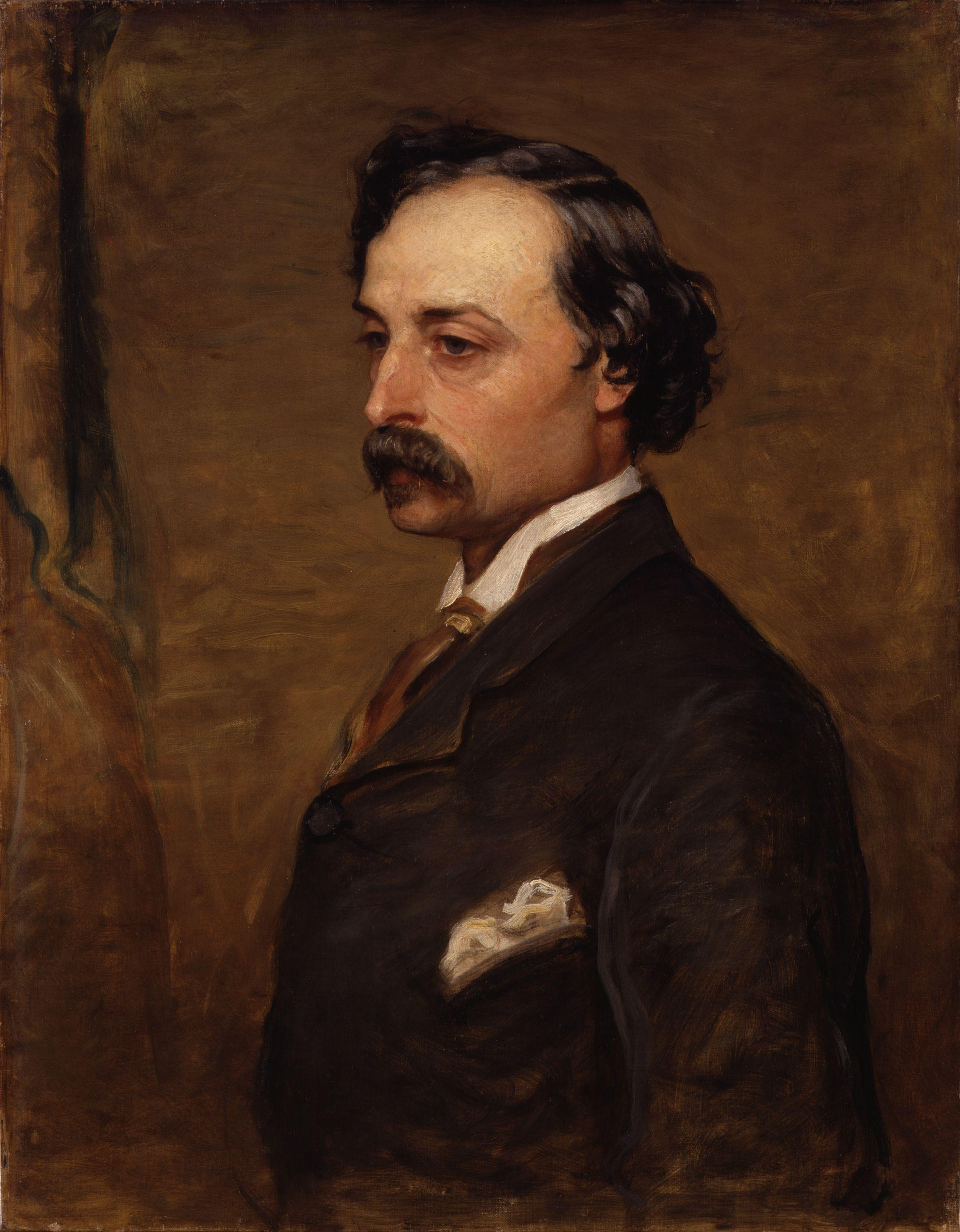
Sir William Quiller Orchardson by Henry Weigall

The period between 1862 and 1880 was one of quiet ambitions, of a characteristic insouciance, of life accepted as a thing of many-balanced interests rather than as a matter of Sturm und Drang. In 1865 Pettie married, and the Fitzroy Square ménage was broken up. In 1868 Orchardson was elected A.R.A. (Associate of the Royal Academy). In 1870, he spent the summer in Venice, travelling home in the early autumn through a France overrun by the German armies. His marriage to Helen Moxon occurred on 6 April 1873, and in 1877 he was elected to the full membership of the Royal Academy. In this year he finished building Ivyside, a house at Westgate-on-Sea with an open tennis-court and a studio in the garden. In 1891 he appears in a group portrait of a Royal Society soiree between the actress Ellen Terry and the organiser of nurses Rachel Ward, Countess of Dudley.

He died in London two and a half weeks after his 78th birthday, having been knighted less than three years previously.

There is a memorial which mentions Orchardson within Margate Cemetery, Kent. Now fallen over, its inscription reads:

In memory of William Quiller Orchardson (Knight) R.A., H.R.S.A, D.C.L, and Officer of the Legion of Honour. Born 27 March 1833, died 13 April 1910.

Ellen Orchardson his wife born 5 May 1853, died 13 May 1917.

Capt. Charles Moxon Quiller Orchardson born 24 December 1873, died of wounds in Egypt 26 April 1917.

Celeste Orchardson born 24 December 1876, died 30 August 1877.

== Legacy ==
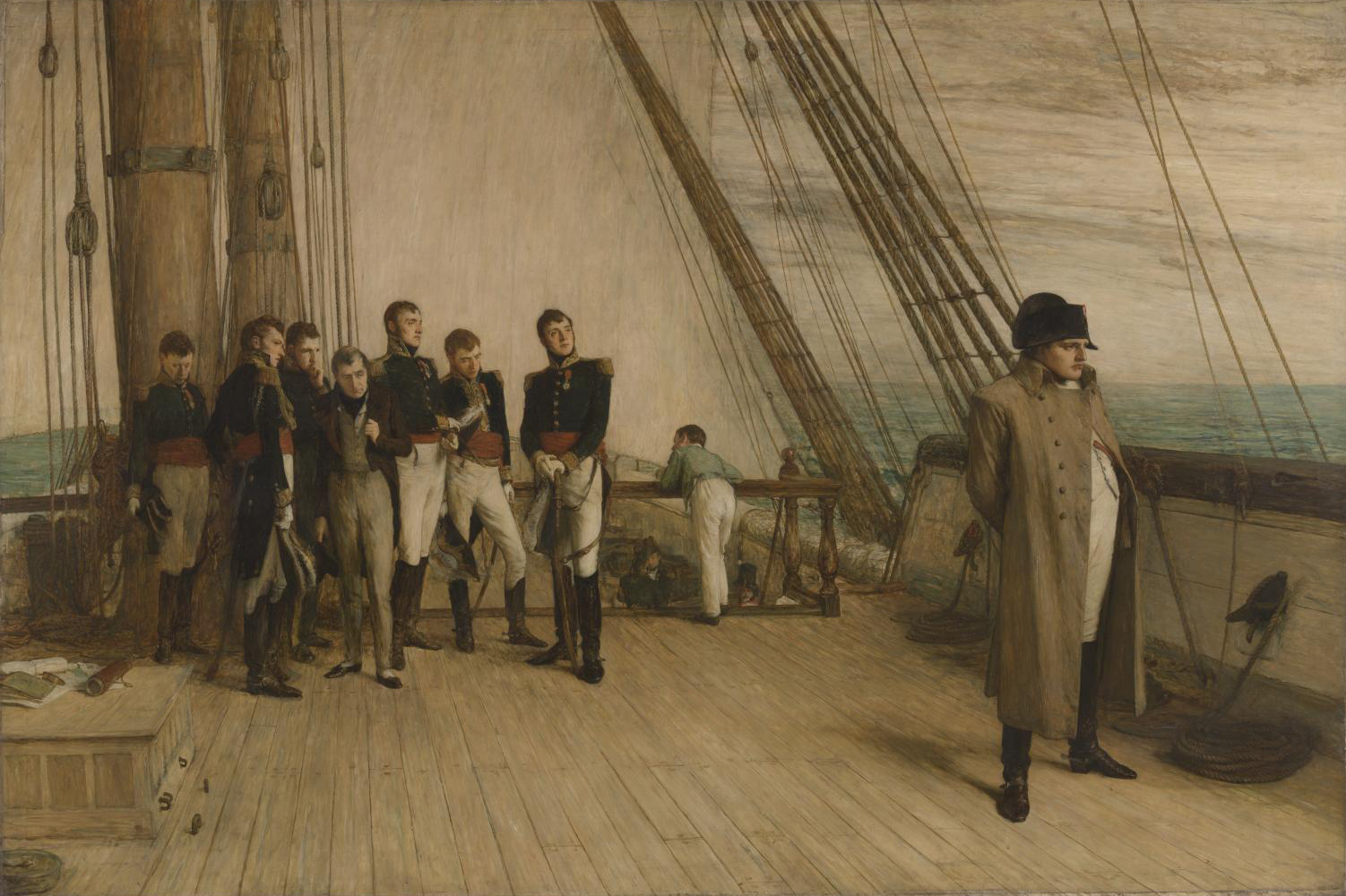
Napoleon on Board the Bellerophon, 1880

Orchardson's wider popularity dates from 1880. To that year's Royal Academy summer exhibition he sent the large Napoleon on board the Bellerophon, which was acquired for the national collection by the Trustees of the Chantrey Bequest for Tate. For a decade or more, Orchardson's work was eagerly looked for at the Academy. He followed up the Napoleon on the Bellerophon, with Voltaire at the Academy of 1883. Technically, the "Voltaire" is, perhaps, his high-water mark; the subject does not explain itself, but requires a previous knowledge on the part of the spectator of how Voltaire was beaten by the servants of the Chevalier de Rohan-Chabot, and how the duc de Sully failed to avenge his guest.

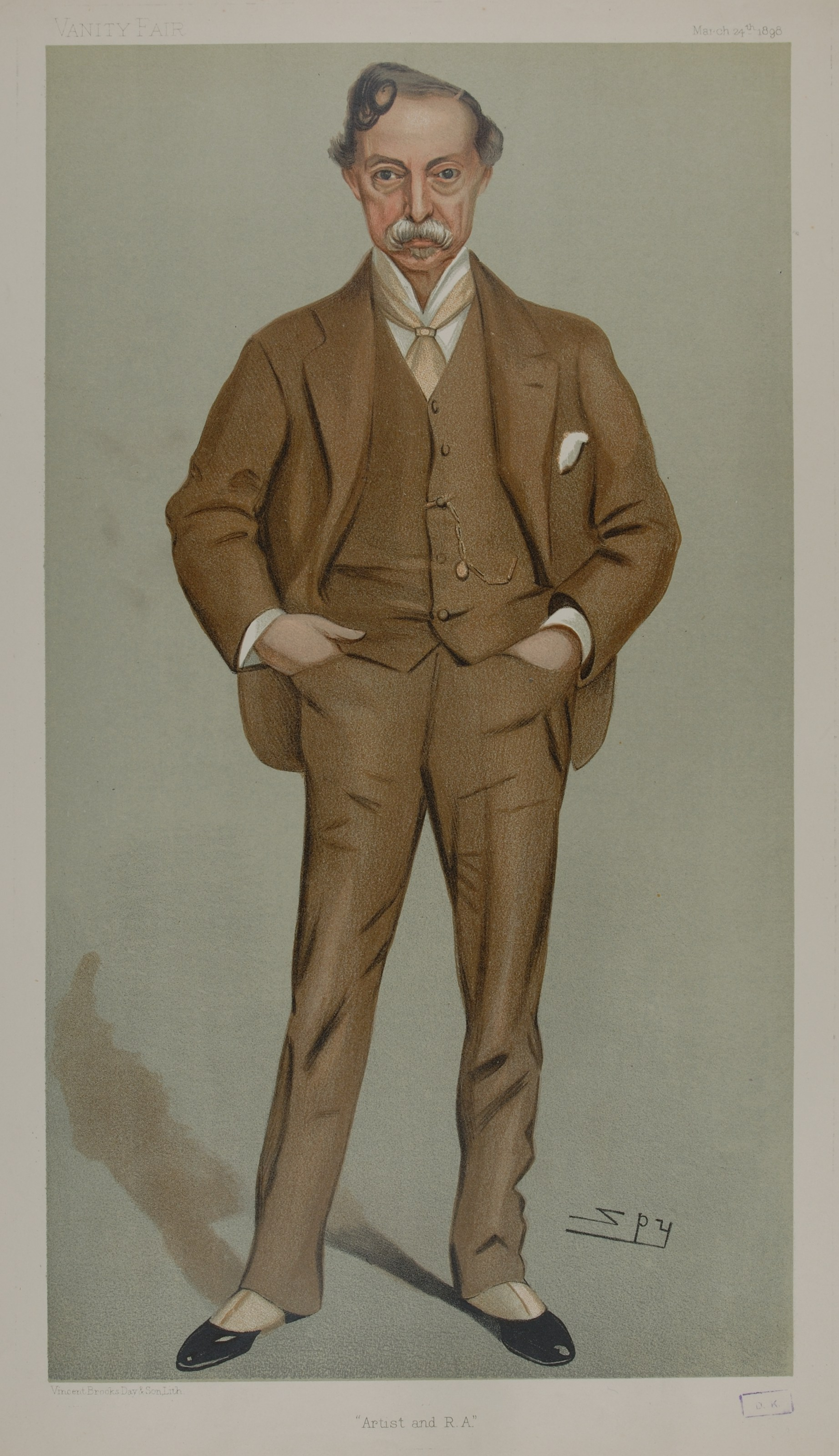
Orchardson caricatured by Spy for Vanity Fair, 1898

The Voltaire was followed, in 1884, by the "Marriage de convenance", perhaps the most popular of all Orchardson's pictures; in 1885, by "The Salon of Madame Récamier"; in 1886, by "After", the sequel to the "Marriage de convenance", and "A Tender Chord"; in 1887, by "The First Cloud"; in 1888, by "Her Mother's Voice"; and in 1889, by "The Young Duke", a canvas on which he returned to much the same pictorial scheme as that of the "Voltaire". Subsequently, he exhibited a series of pictures in which pictorial use was made of the Empire style, the subjects, as a rule, being only just enough to suggest a title. "An Enigma", "A Social Eddy", "Reflections", "If music be the food of love, play on!", "Music, when sweet voices die, vibrates on the memory", "Her First Dance" — in these, opportunities are made to introduce old keyboard instruments, Aubusson carpets, and short-waisted gowns.

Orchardson in Master Baby connected subject-painting with portraiture. "Mrs Joseph", "Mrs Ralli", "Sir Andrew Walker, Bart.", "Charles Moxon, Esq.", "Mrs Orchardson", "Conditional Neutrality" (a portrait of Orchardson's eldest son as a boy of six), "Lord Rookwood", "The Provost of Aberdeen" and, notably, "Sir Walter Gilbey, Bart.", were distinguished portraits. The major commission received by Orchardson as a portrait-painter was that for the Royal group of Queen Victoria with her son (afterwards King Edward VII), grandson and great-grandson, to be painted on one canvas for the Royal Agricultural Society. He continued painting to the end of his life, and had three portraits ready for the Royal Academy in the final year of his life, 1910.

== Works ==
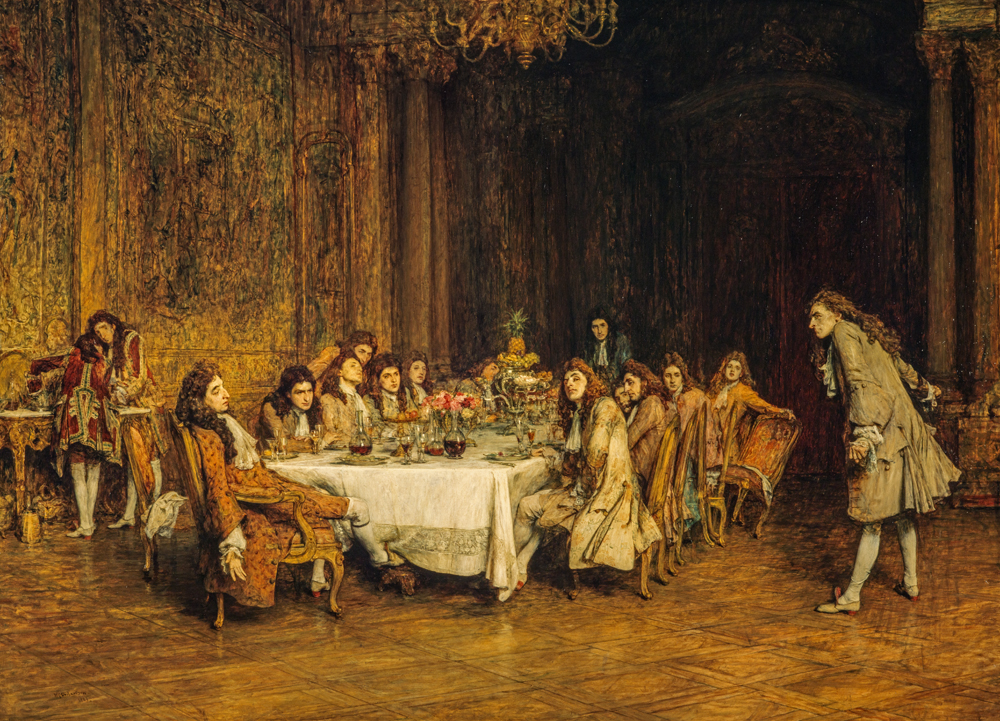
Voltaire

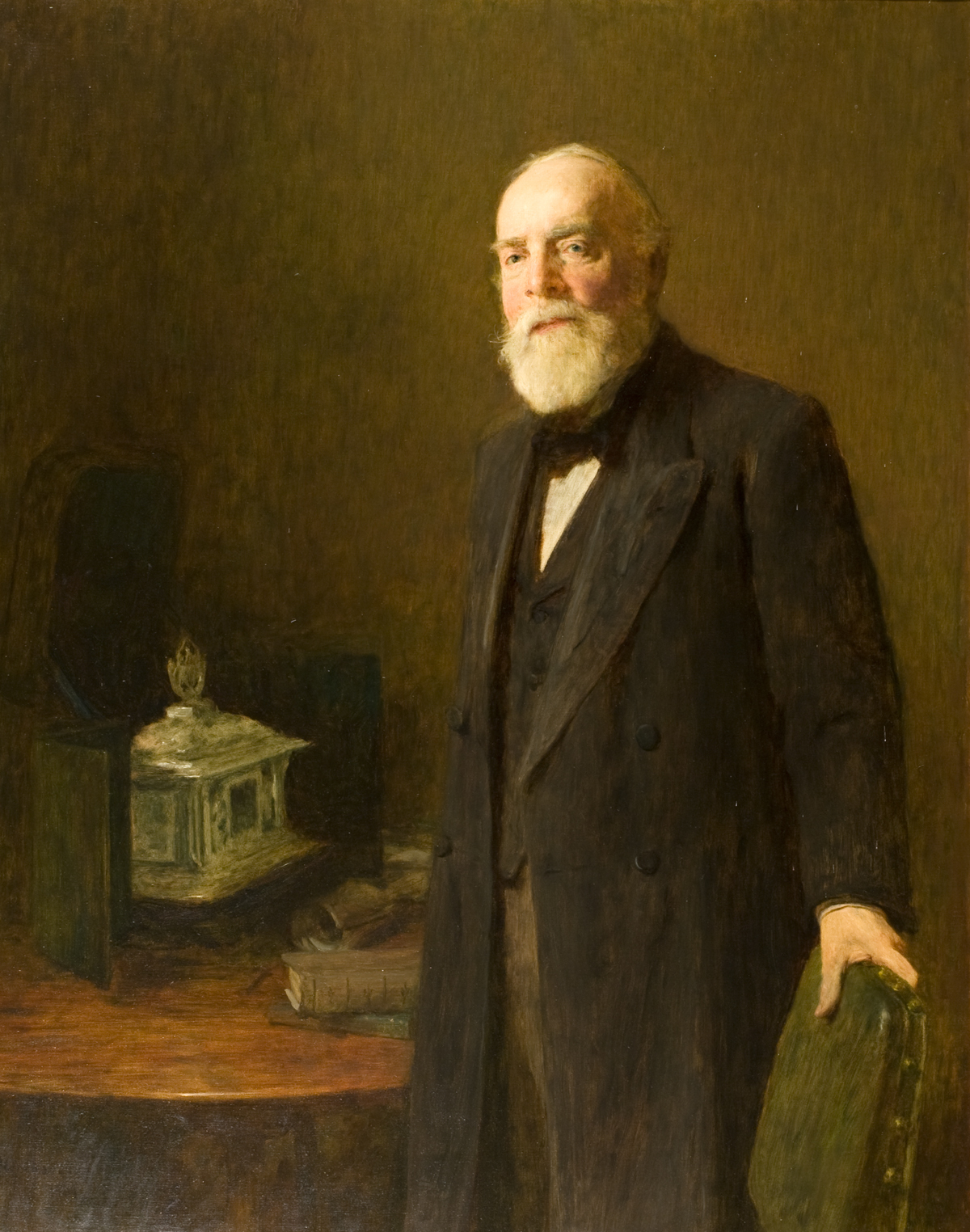
Sir John Leng (1828–1906),

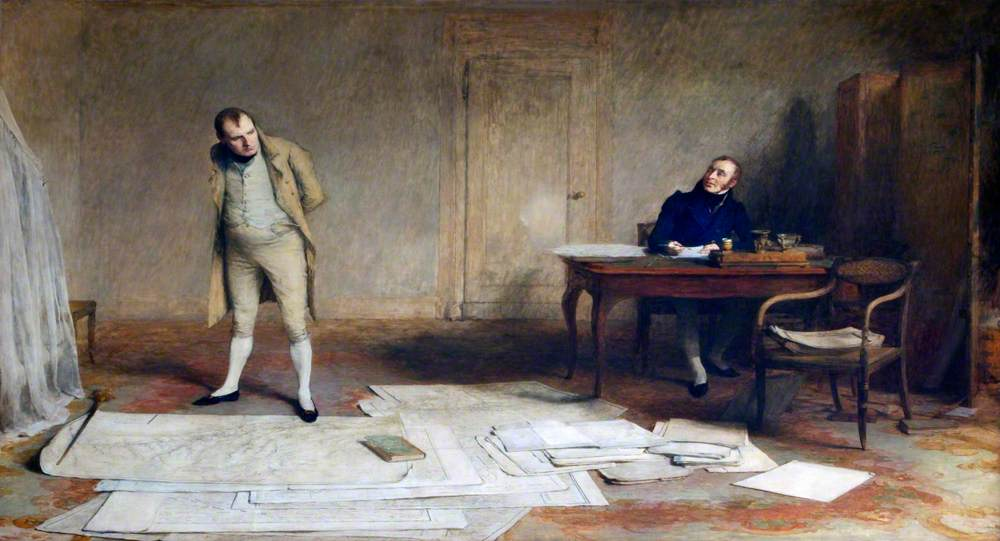
St. Helena 1816: Napoleon dictating to Count Las Cases the Account of his Campaigns

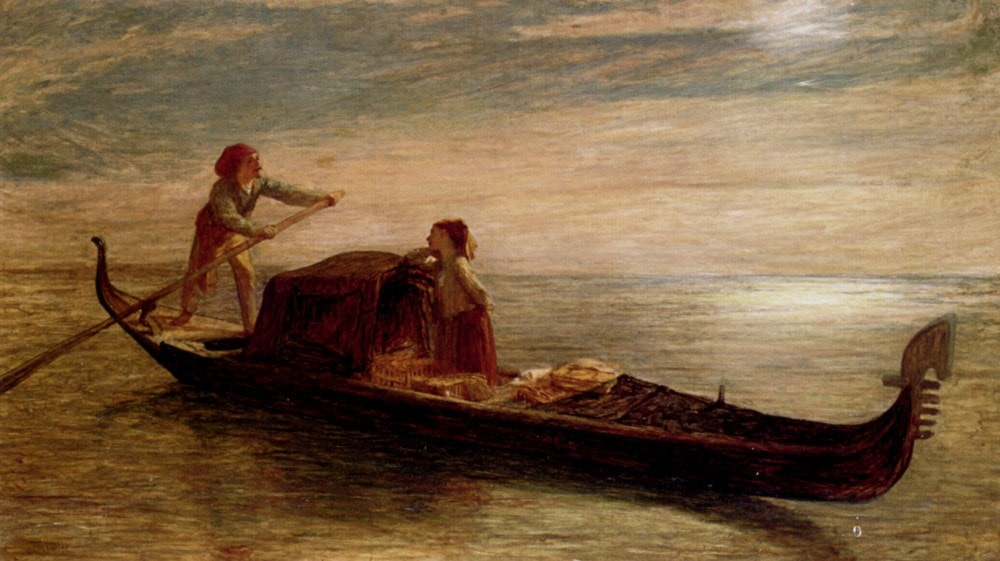
The Market Girl From The Lido (1870)

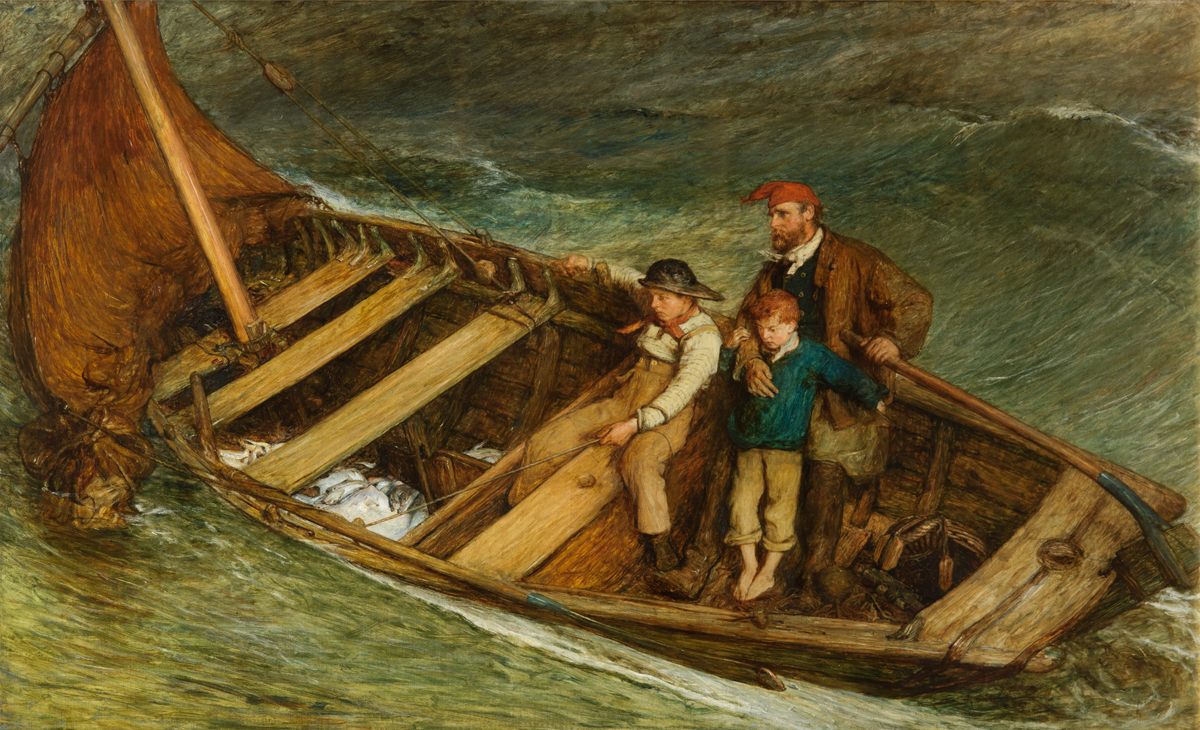
William Quiller Orchardson - Toilers of the Sea (1870)

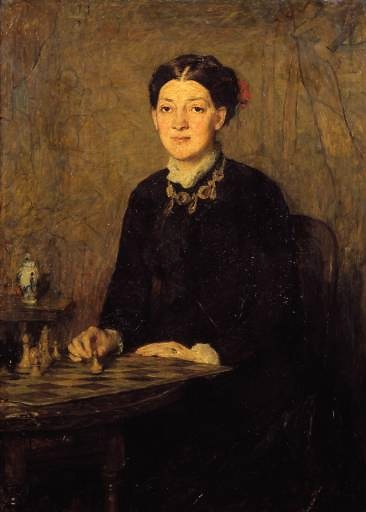
Mrs Charles Moxon

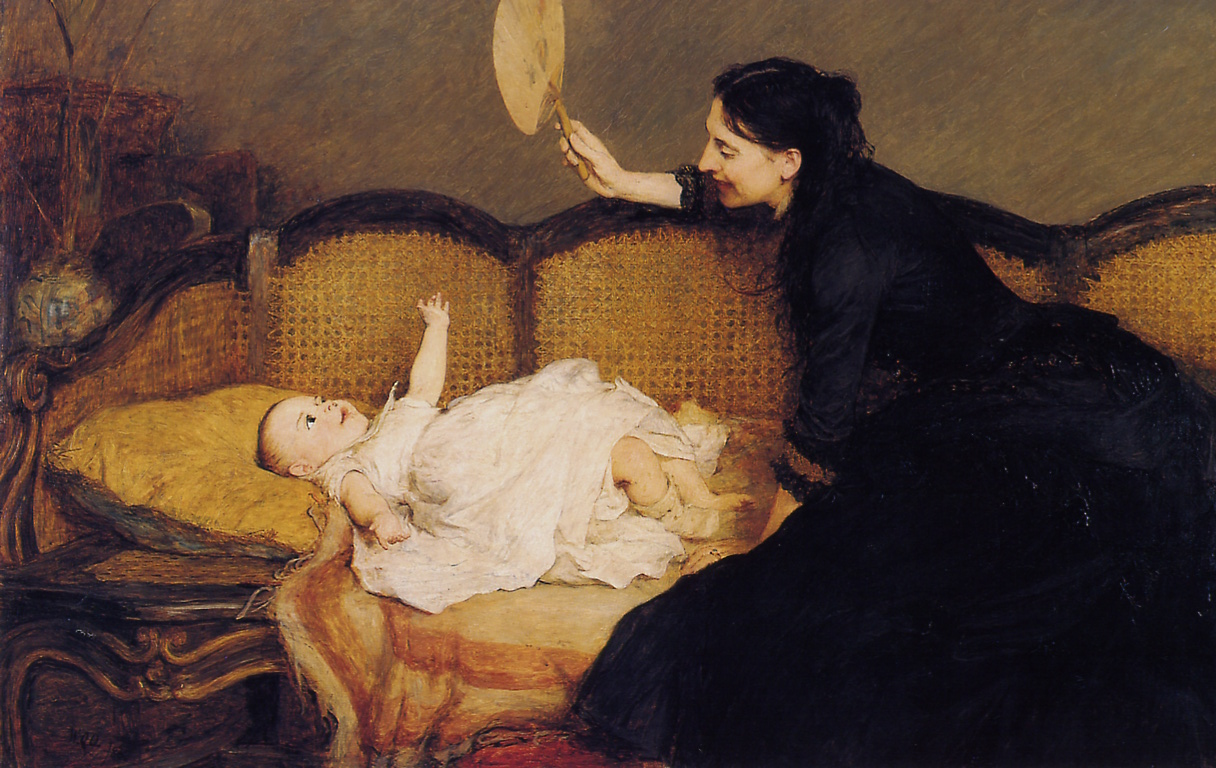
Master Baby

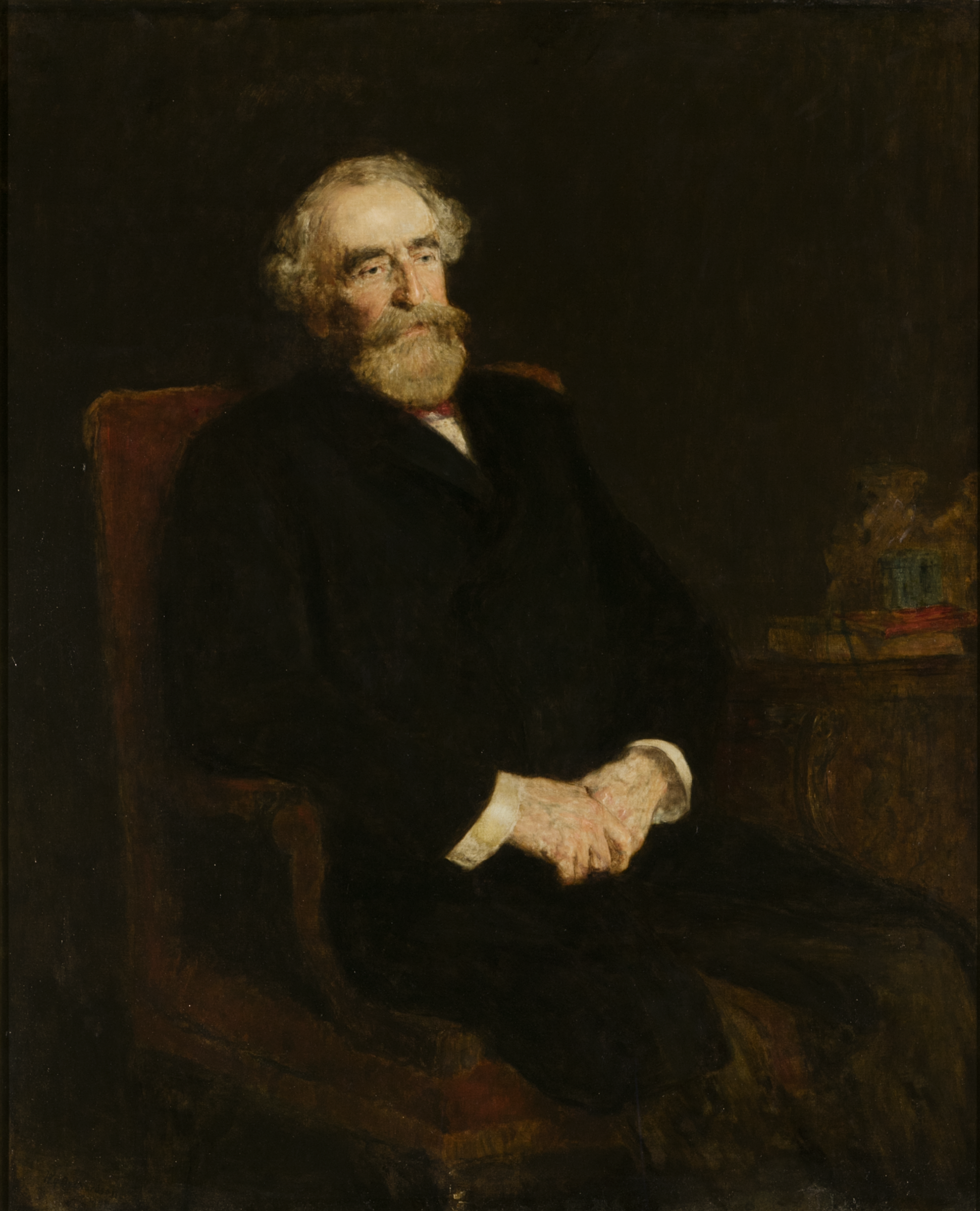
Peter Russell, Esq.
