= Alexander Moody Stuart =

Scottish minister (1809–1898)

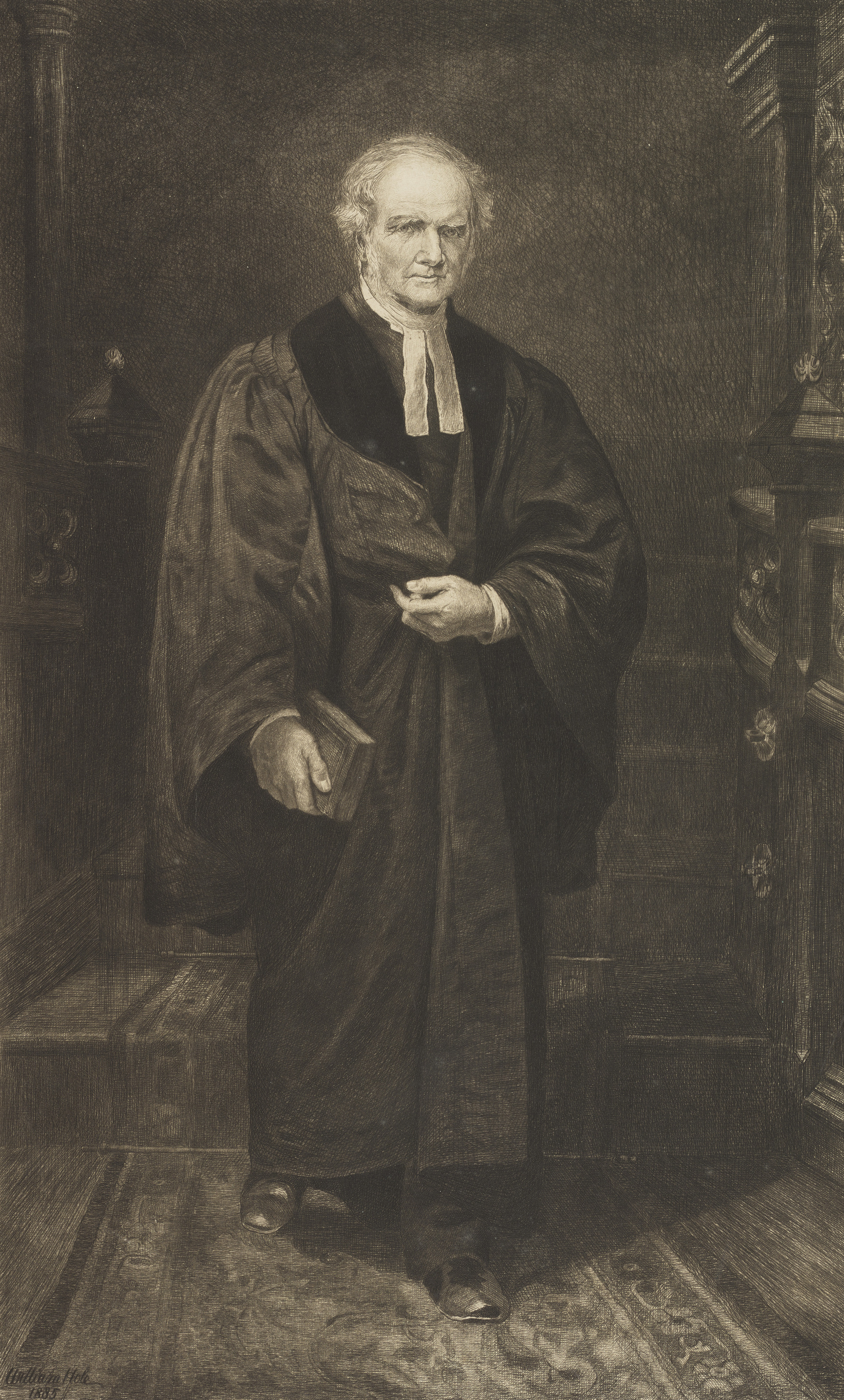
Alexander Moody Stuart, 1809–1898. Free Church minister

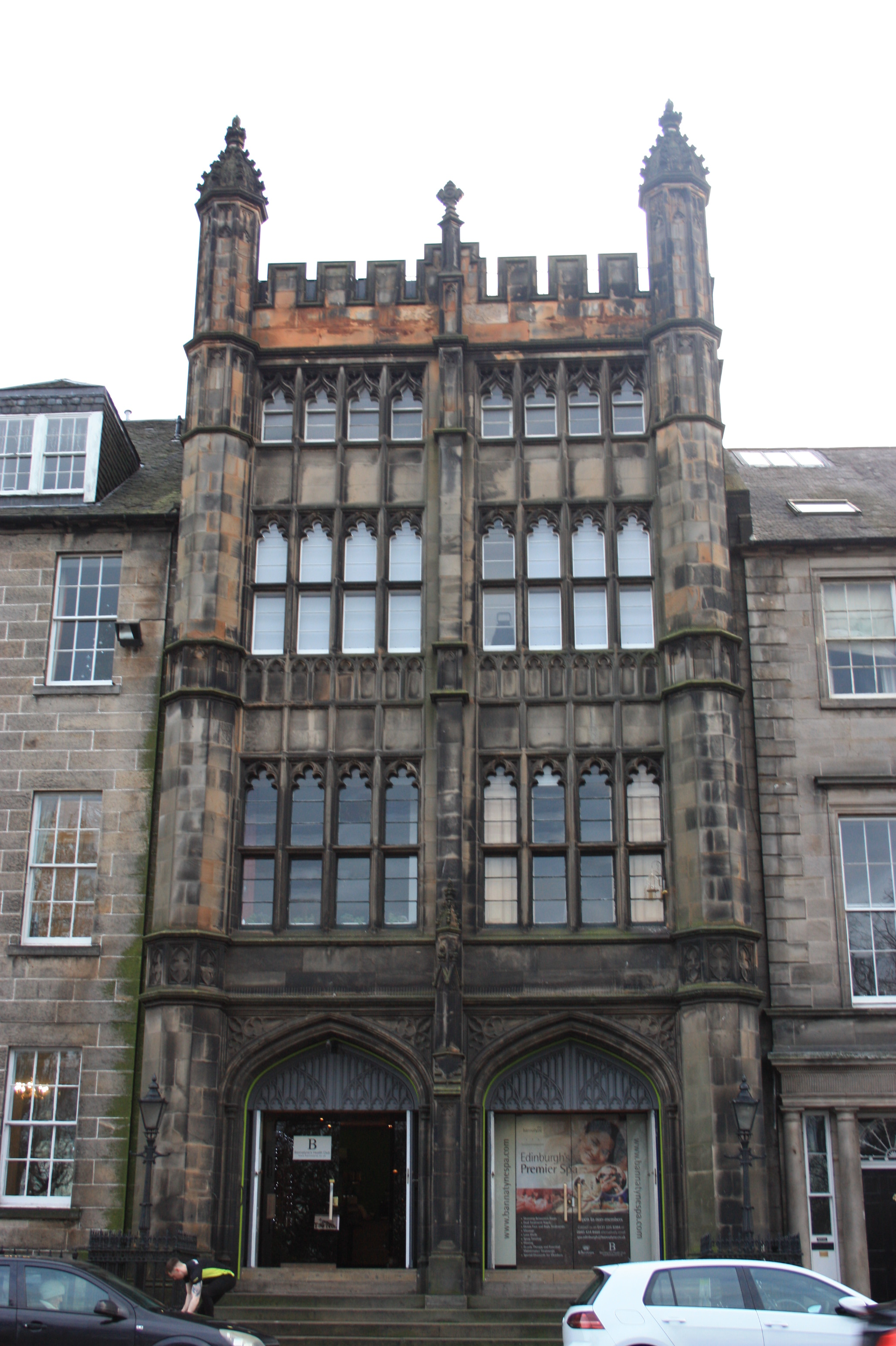
43 Queen Street, Edinburgh

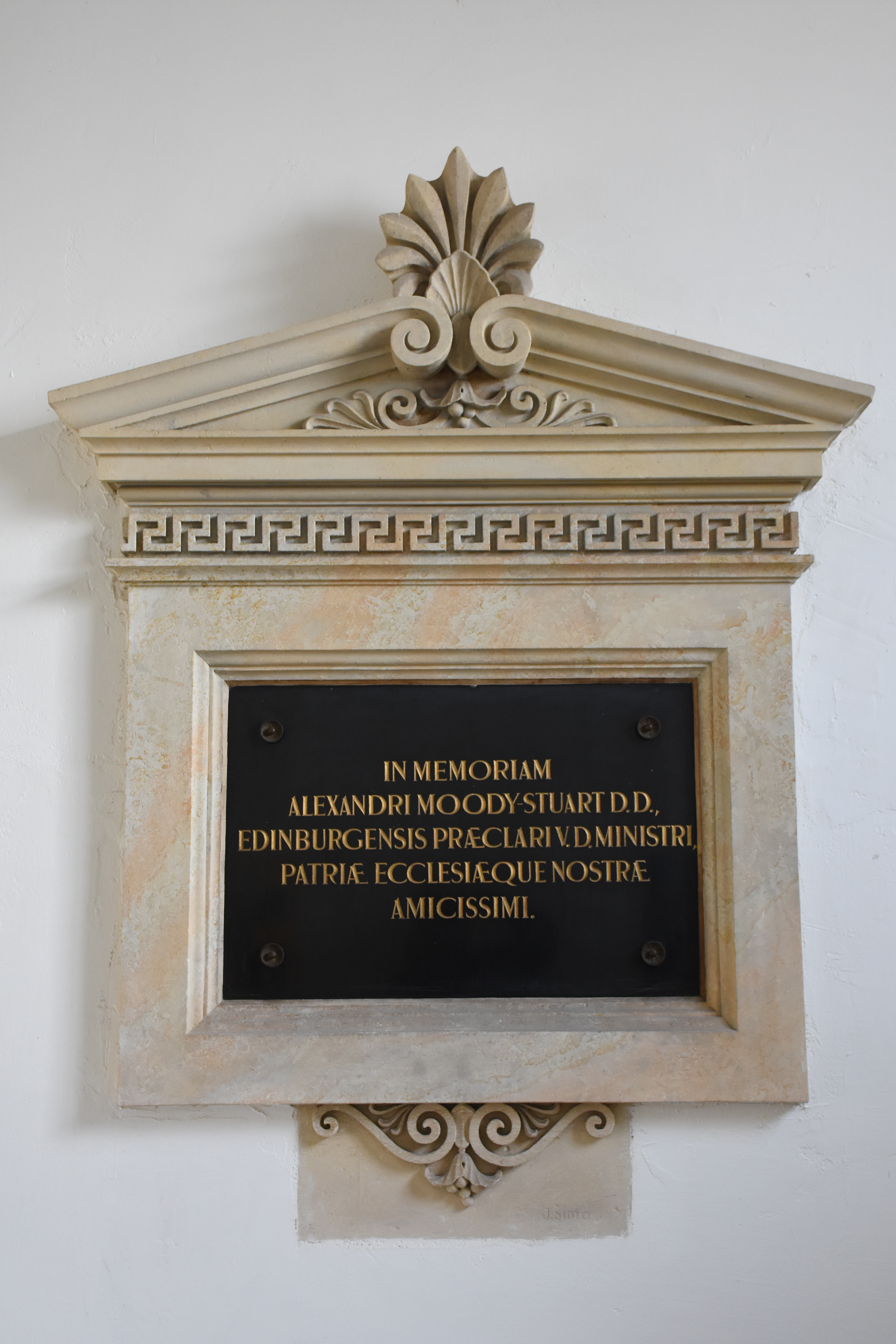
Memorial plaque to Alexander Moody Stuart in Kutná Hora (Bohemia)

Alexander Moody Stuart (15 June 1809 – 31 July 1898) was a minister of the Free Church of Scotland. He served as Moderator of the General Assembly to the Free Church of Scotland in 1875.

== Life ==
He was born Alexander Moody on 15 June 1809 in Paisley the son of Andrew Moody, a banker and chief magistrate of Paisley and his wife, Margaret Fulton McBriar.

He studied at Glasgow University graduating MA in 1830, then studied at Divinity Hall in Edinburgh. He was licensed to preach by the Church of Scotland in 1831.

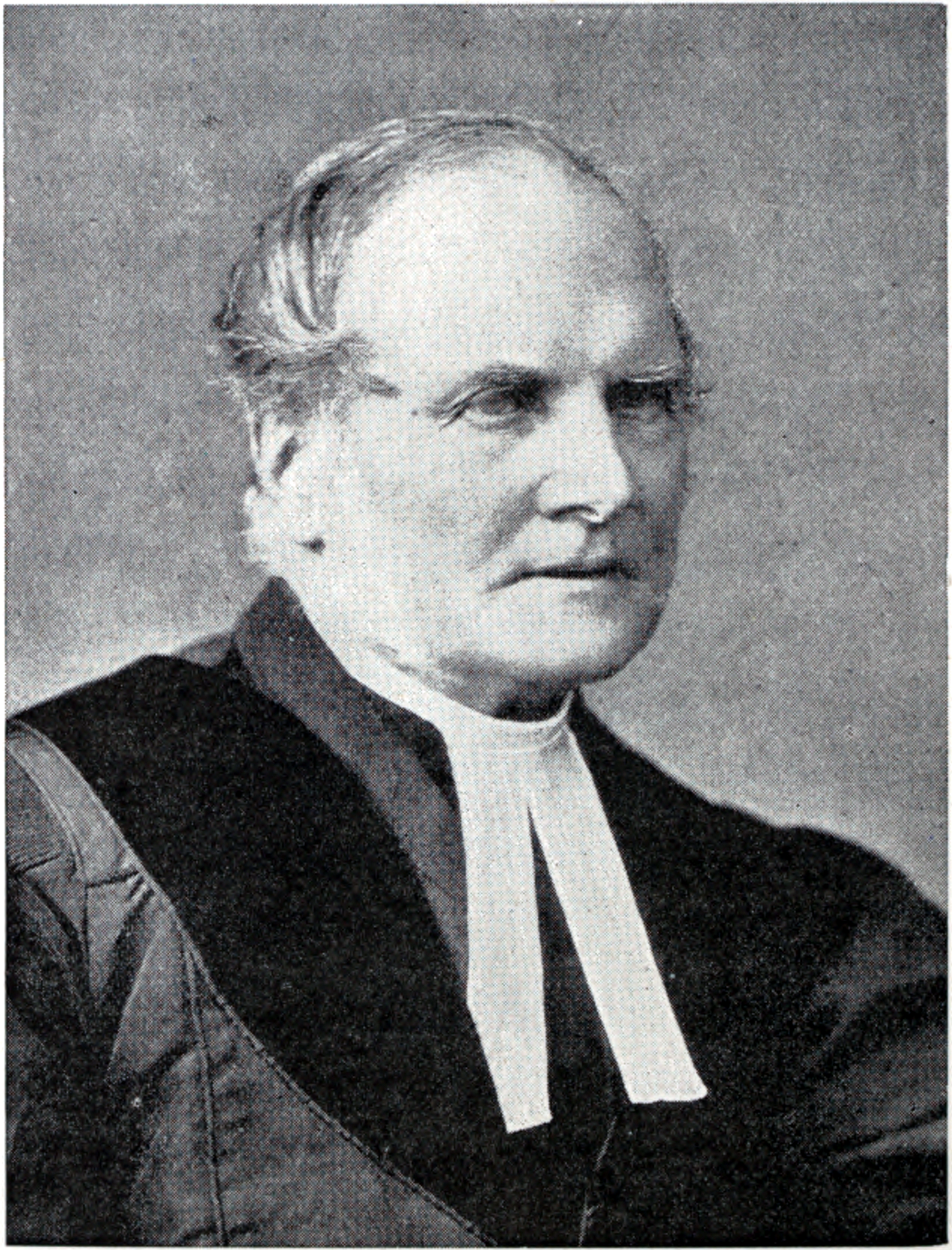
Dr. A. Moody-Stuart from "The Sea of Galilee Mission of the Free Church of Scotland"

Moody was a missionary in Holy Island, Northumberland, from 1831 to 1835. From 1835, at the request of the Kirk session of St George's Church in Edinburgh, he began the work of gathering a congregation for a new church in Young Street. It was opened on 27 July 1837 and named St Luke's. He was ordained as its first minister.

On 9 September 1839, he married Jessie Stuart (died 27 April 1891), eldest daughter of Kenneth Bruce Stuart of Annat. Jessie inherited the family estate at Rait on the braes of the Carse of Gowrie, which was named Annat after an old family estate, with the condition that her husband should take the surname Stuart of Annat. Hence Alexander Moody took the name Alexander Moody Stuart.

After the Disruption of 1843, he left the established church and joined the Free Church of Scotland. He avoided the issue of losing his church and manse by taking a long vacation "on health grounds", firstly in Madeira and then in Brazil. He returned to Scotland in the spring of 1845 as minister of St Luke's Free Church. He lived at 43 Queen Street, an impressive Georgian townhouse in Edinburgh's First New Town. The house was remodelled in 1851 by a local architect, John Henderson, who gave it a Gothic frontage, very different from the rest of the street. He also owned a country property: Annat Cottage in Errol, Perthshire.

He was convener of the Jewish Mission of the Free Church from 1847 to 1889 (with a brief interval), and was Moderator of the General Assembly of the Free Church in 1875/76. He received the honorary doctorate of Doctor of Divinity (DD) from the University of Edinburgh in 1875.

In 1875, he succeeded Robert Walter Stewart as Moderator of the General Assembly, the highest position within the Free Church of Scotland.

He was a strong supporter of the Establishment Principle and opponent of disestablishment of the Church of Scotland. He opposed Higher Criticism, and the proposed union with the United Presbyterian Church. He interested himself in promoting friendly relations between Scottish Presbyterians and the Reformed churches of Hungary and Bohemia.

He retired in 1876, on completion of his role as Moderator and died at Crieff in Perthshire on 31 July 1898, aged 89. He is buried at Kilspindie Parish Churchyard.

== Family ==
His son Kenneth Moody Stuart (1841–1904) was minister of the Free Church in Moffat and wrote both his father's biography and that of the preacher Brownlow North.

Alexander Moody Stuart LLD (b. 1844) was Professor of Law at Glasgow University from 1887 to 1905.

Jessie Moody Stuart (1850–1895) married George Watt KC Sheriff of Chancery

== Publications ==
- Revival of Religion (1842)
- Deathbed Scenes (1843)
- Ireland Open to the Gospel (1847)
- A Practical Exposition of the Song of Solomon (1857)
- The Three Marys (1862)
- Life and letters of Elizabeth, Last Duchess of Gordon (1865)
- A visit to the land of Huss (1870)
- Recollections of the late John Duncan, L.L.D. (1872)
- The Bible True to Itself (1884)
