= Kay's Bar (Edinburgh) =

Acclaimed historic pub in Edinburgh

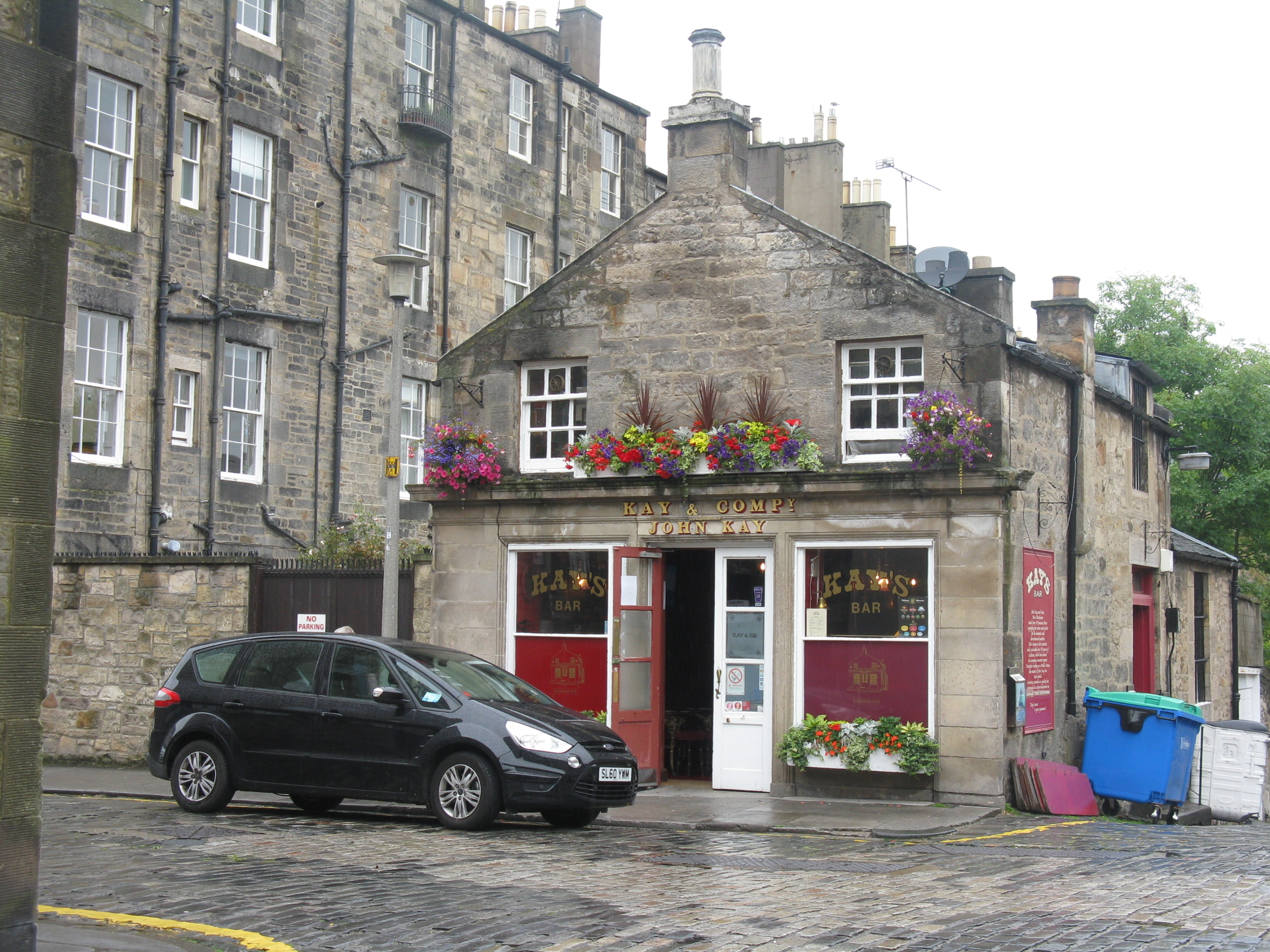
- Interactive map of the Kay's Bar area

General information
- Type: Pub
- Location: 39 Jamaica Street West, Edinburgh, EH3 6HF, Edinburgh, United Kingdom
- Opened: 1820s (estimated)

Website
- https://www.kaysbar.uk

Kay's Bar is a pub in Edinburgh, Scotland, located in former slums between the Royal Circus and Queen Street Gardens. Previously a wine shop, it became a pub in the 1970s.

== History ==
Before becoming a bottle shop, the building was a coach house. It was converted into the shop for John Kay & Sons, a wine merchant, in the early 19th century.

By the middle of the 19th century, despite being sandwiched by salubrious streets either side, Jamaica Street had become "awash with effluent, home to shebeens, houses of ill-repute, small industries pouring out smoke and smell and noise."

In 1964, the area had been designated a slum, and was earmarked for demolition. Labour leader Harold Wilson visited the area and remarked that the housing on the street was some of the worst he had ever seen in the country. However, while most of the street was demolished, small sections at either end were kept, including the John Kay & Sons shop. Photos inside the current pub show the street before the demolition.

The shop closed in the 1970s and reopened as a pub. It contains a main bar room with small sets of tables and an open fire, with a smaller snug at the back with enough space for two tables. It now attracts a mix of locals and tourists. The pub still displays some bottles and labels from its time as a wine and alcohol shop.

== Accolades ==
- Featured in The New York Times "36 Hours in Edinburgh" guide (2016)
- Edinburgh winner of the CAMRA Real Ale Quality Award (2021 and 2022)
- Featured in The Times list "Five of the best pubs with fires in Scotland" (2024)
- Acclaimed mixologist Ryan "Mr Lyan" Chetiyawardana named it one of his favourite bars in the world (2024)
- Scotch whisky expert Charles MacLean's "Best cosy small bar" in Edinburgh (2024)
