= Robert Frier =

Scottish artist (1855–1912)

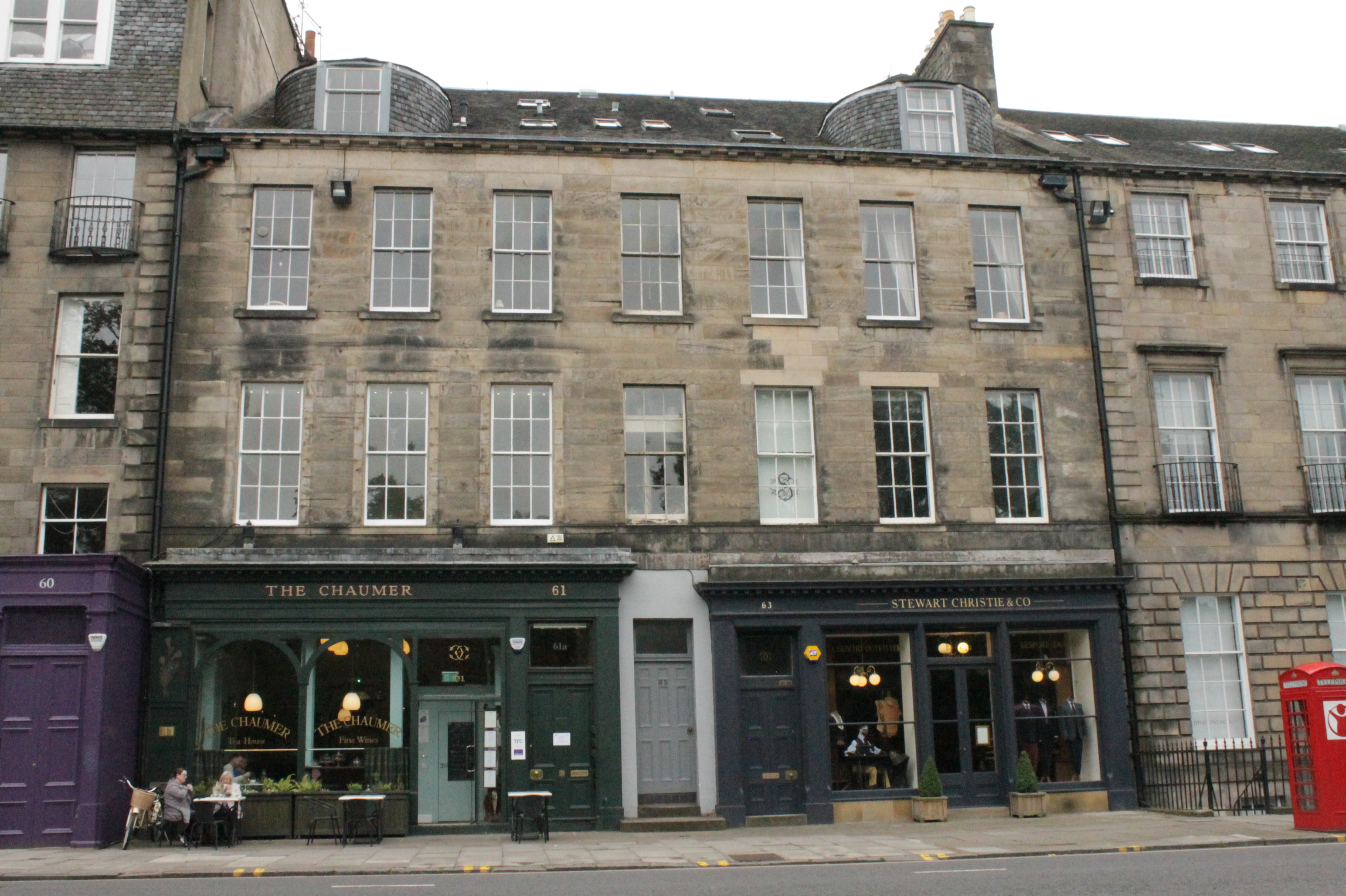
62 Queen Street, Edinburgh

Robert Frier RSA (1855 –1912) was a Scottish artist. He specialised in landscapes.

== Life ==
His father Robert Frier [Snr] (14 March 1818 - 16 September 1893) was a draper with a shop on the Lawnmarket in the Old Town and living at Ratcliffe Terrace in the South Side. He exhibited at the Royal Scottish Academy from 1853 and in later censuses he was recorded as a landscape artist.

His mother was Margaret Palmer (24 August 1823 - 29 April 1888) from Kirkcudbright. Robert [Snr] and Margaret married on 7 November 1845 in Edinburgh. Most of their children were artists.

Robert Frier [Jnr.] was born in Edinburgh on 1855. His older brother Henry (Harry) Frier (1849-1921) was also an artist.

In 1880 he was living in a flat at 62 Queen Street, Edinburgh.

By 1890 he is living in a much larger house at 108 George Street and is listed as a "landscape artist and teacher of drawing and painting".

By 1895 he has left Edinburgh, possibly to live with his brother Henry in London.

== Known works ==
- Stormy Highland Scene with Fishermen
- Scottish Landscape with Stick Gatherer
- Boat on a Canal with Trees
- Two Figures on a Bridge
- Scottish River Scene
- On the Lochside near Luss
- In the Leny Glen
