= George Hay (artist) =

Scottish artist (1831–1912)

George Hay RSA RSW (1831–1912) was a Scottish artist. His narrative paintings are often inspired by the works of Sir Walter Scott. In 1878 he founded the Royal Scottish Society of Painters in Watercolours.

== Life ==
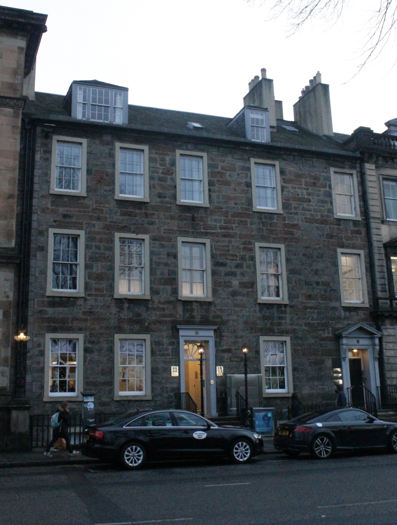
11, 12 Queen Street, Edinburgh

Hay was born at Prospect Bank House in Leith (Edinburgh's harbour town) in 1831.

He studied art under Robert Scott Lauder alongside William McTaggart, William Quiller Orchardson and Hugh Cameron. The latter became a close friend and they shared a studio at 12 Queen Street, Edinburgh from 1880.

In 1865 he was living at 16 Picardy Place at the head of Leith Walk.

He became an associate of the Royal Scottish Academy in 1869 and a full member in 1876. He was Secretary to the RSA from 1881 to 1907.

He moved to 9 Castle Terrace in 1884 but moved a year later to a Victorian terraced house at 7 Ravelston Terrace in west Edinburgh, where he lived for the rest of his life.

== Works ==
Hay spent his working life in Scotland. He exhibited 132 works at The Royal Scottish Academy (RSA) between 1856 and 1913 and 15 at the Royal Glasgow Institute of the Fine Arts. In his narrative paintings he mainly depicted 18th century society, often taken from Sir Walter Scott's Waverley Novels.

An example is ’ Caleb Balderston’s Ruse’ from ‘The Bride of Lammermoor’. It was exhibited at the RSA in 1876 and was submitted as his Diploma Work. It was accepted and he was elected to the rank of Academician (member) of the RSA. The painting shows Caleb, an elderly servant, smashing crockery while a maid (Mysie) looks on in horror. Apparently it is a ludicrous stratagem for protecting Caleb’s master’s honour. The painting can be seen on the Art UK web site.

Hay exhibited a further three paintings at the RSA inspired by ’The Bride of Lammermoor’, .in 1881, 1886 and 1903 (RSA Catalogue pages 157 and 158). They all have the title ‘Caleb Balderston reconnoitring the Cooper’s Kitchen’. They show Caleb peering into the Cooper’s kitchen deciding if he can steal some food for his impoverished master’s table. In the kitchen there are the Cooper’s wife, her mother and one of the Cooper’s apprentices spit-roasting meat on the fire.

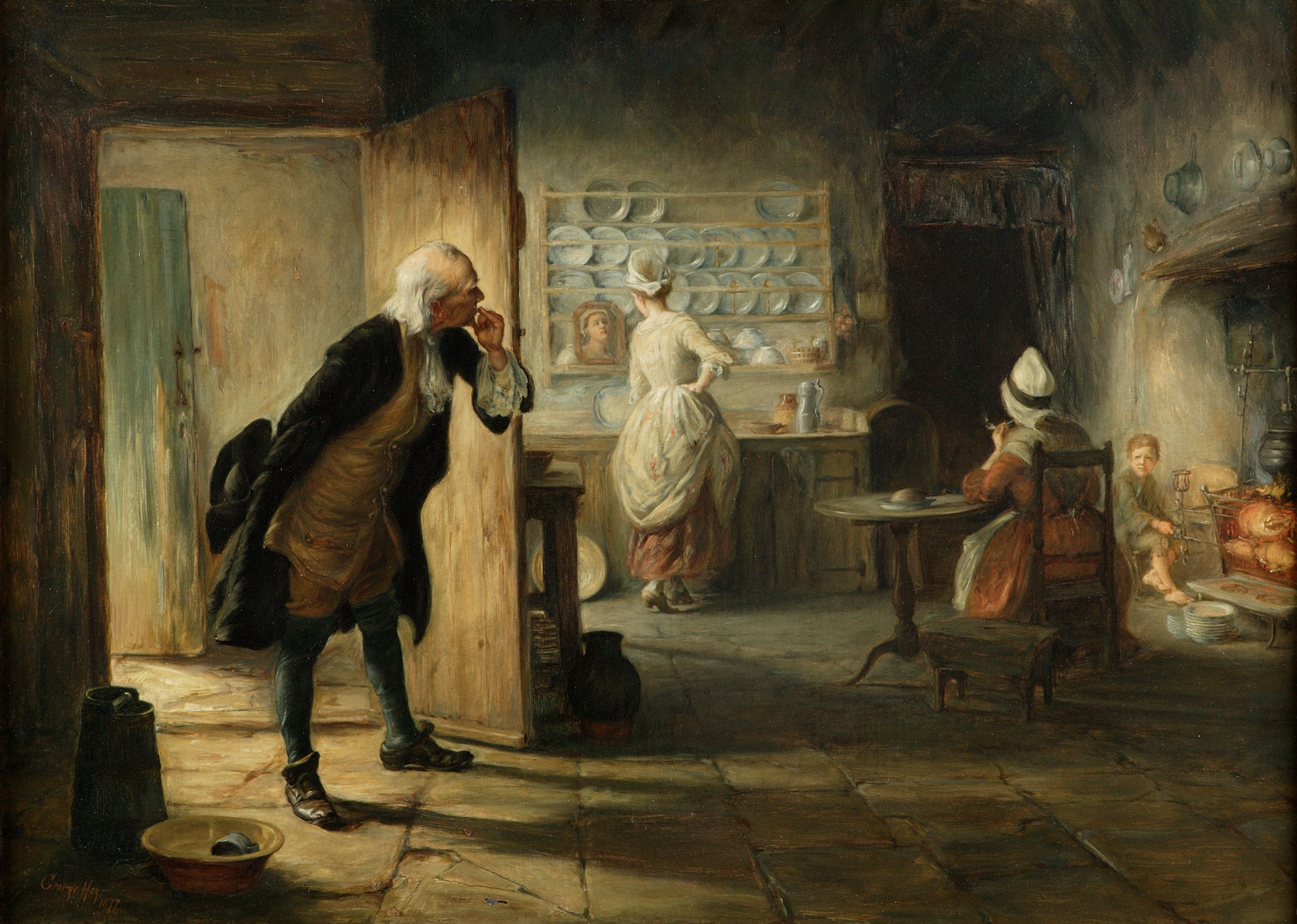
Caleb Balderstone reconnoitring the Cooper's Kitchen. George Hay, signed and dated 1877 (dimensions 63x89cm).

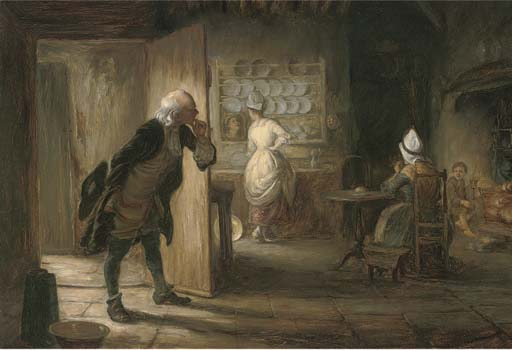
Caleb Balderstone reconnoitring the Cooper's Kitchen. Signed G Hay (lower left). Dimensions 49.5x68.5cm.

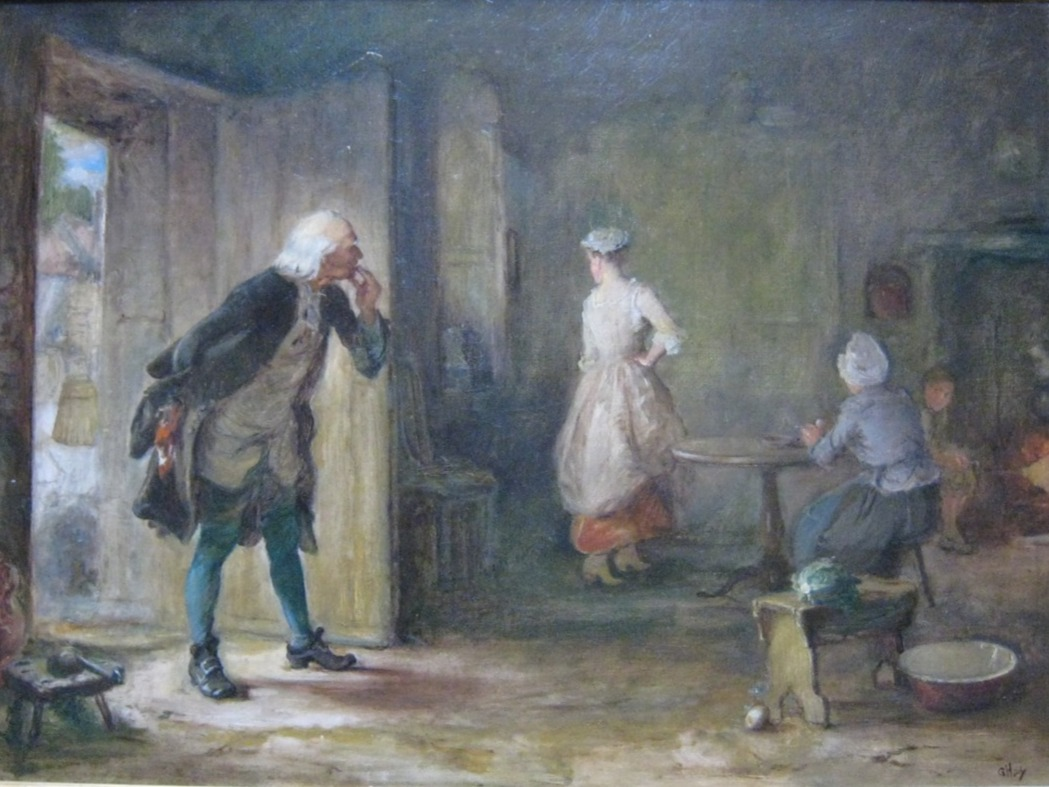
Caleb Balderstone reconnoitring the Cooper's Kitchen. Study. Signed G Hay (lower right). Dimensions 41x56cm

The largest painting, measuring 63x89cm, was the most finely painted of the three, and was dated 1877. It was sold at Bonhams, Edinburgh (Lot 1018, 25 August, 2006) with the title 'Neighbourly Intentions'. The second painting illustrated measured 49.5x68.5cm, and was sold at Christie's, South Kensington (lot 325, 24 May 2006) with the title 'The new dress'. The smallest painting (41x56cm) had the extra word ‘’Study’’ added to the title in the 1903 entry in the RSA Catalogue indicating that it may have been an earlier preparatory oil sketch. It was sold at Lindsay Burns Auction, Perth, Scotland on 21 September, 1989. It was titled 'Interior'.

== Other known works ==
- The Student's Dream (1857)
- Haymaking
- The Pet
- In a Rage
- The Court of Mary Queen of Scots
- A Trusty Maid
- Escaped
- The Milk Cart (John Knox's House 1900)
