= Hugh Cameron (artist) =

Scottish artist

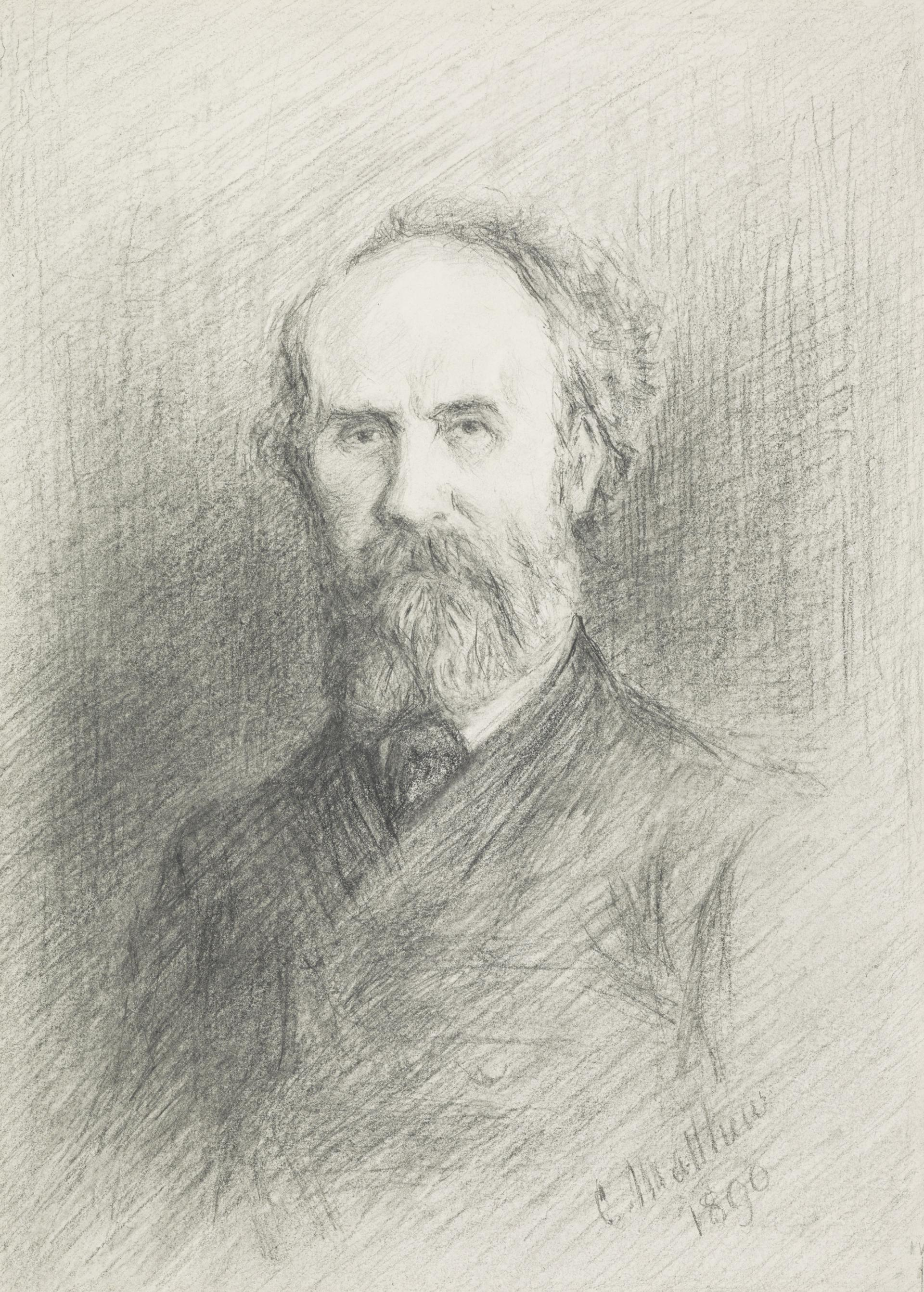
- portrait by Charles Matthew
- Born: 1835; Edinburgh
- Died: 1918 (aged 82–83); Edinburgh
- Occupation: Painter, graphic artist

Hugh Cameron RSA RSW (1835–1918) was a Scottish artist. He specialised in figurative scenes. He exhibited in both the Royal Academy and Royal Scottish Academy from 1871.

== Life ==
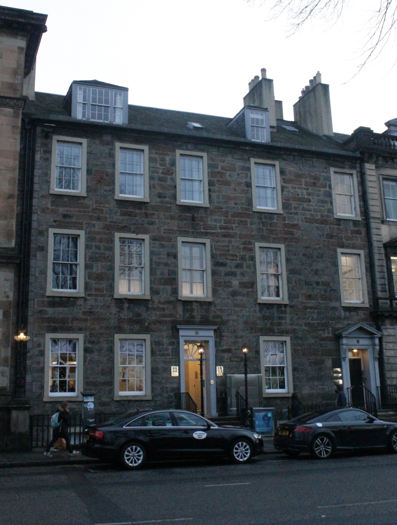
11, 12 Queen Street, Edinburgh

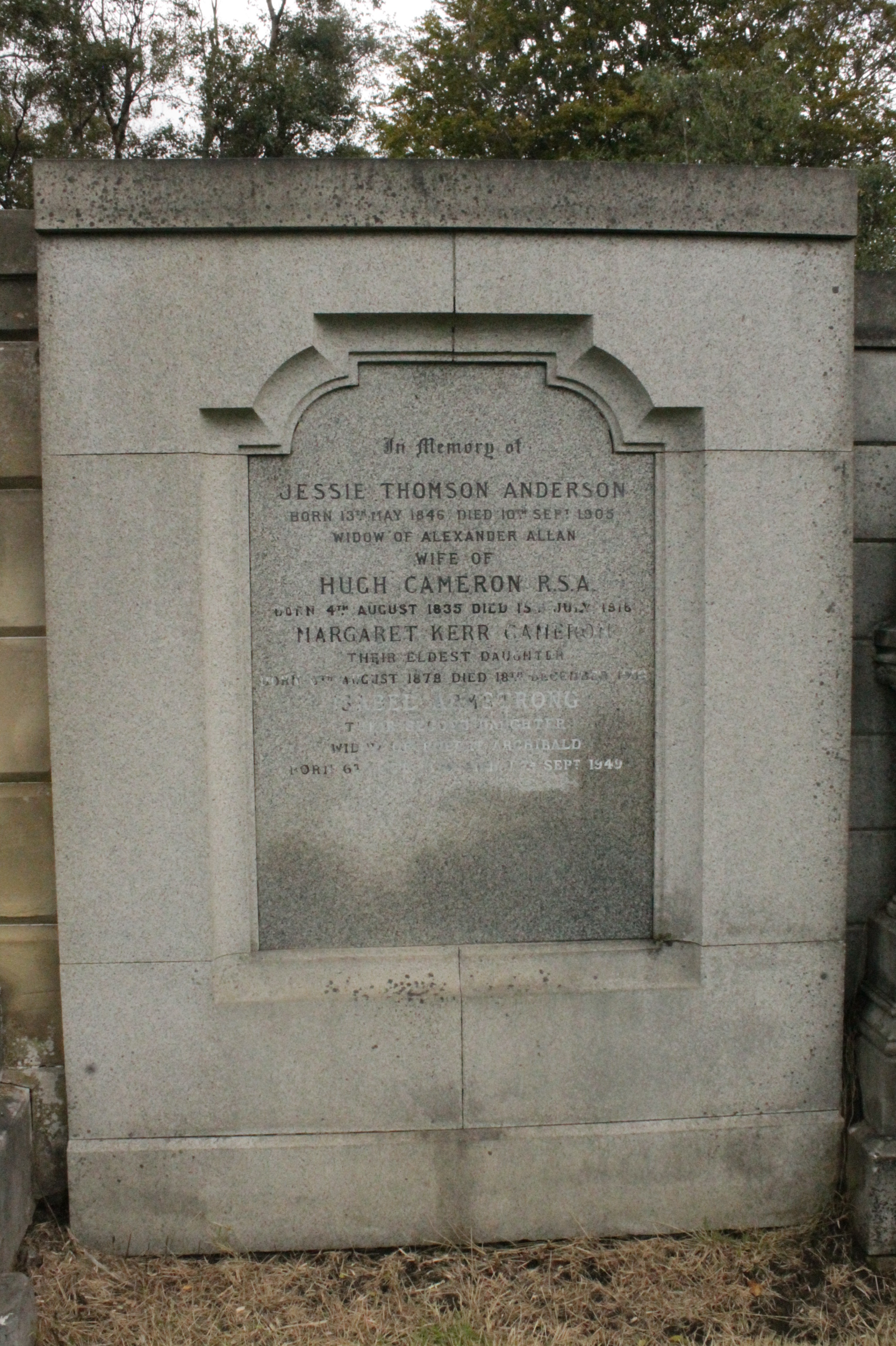
The grave of Hugh Cameron RSA, Grange Cemetery, Edinburgh

He was born in Edinburgh on 4 August 1835, the eldest son of John Cameron and his wife Isabella Armstrong. He was apprenticed to an architect in 1849. In the same year, he began classes at the Trustees Academy. He showed a flair for art and took additional classes under Robert Scott Lauder.

In 1878 he co-founded the Scottish Society of Painters in Watercolour. In 1880 he was sharing a house and studio at 12 Queen Street, Edinburgh with George Hay RSA. This is an outstanding and prestigious property.

In 1900 he was living at 8 Merchiston Place. In 1910 he was living at 45 George Square, Edinburgh, a close neighbour to Percy Portsmouth.

He died at the home of his married daughter, Isabella Armstrong Archibald, on Spottiswoode Street in Edinburgh on 15 July 1918 and is buried in Grange Cemetery in south Edinburgh.

== Family ==
In 1877 he was married to Jessie Thomson Anderson of Glasgow widow of Alexander Allan. His son Hugh S Cameron was also an artist.

== Known works ==
- Going to the Hay (1858)
- Holding the Skein (1883)
- The Go-Cart (1885)
- The spinning Lesson (1885)
- Old Man and Boy with Harp (1890)
- The Highlander's Farewell
