= Robert Walter Stewart =

Scottish minister (1812–1887)

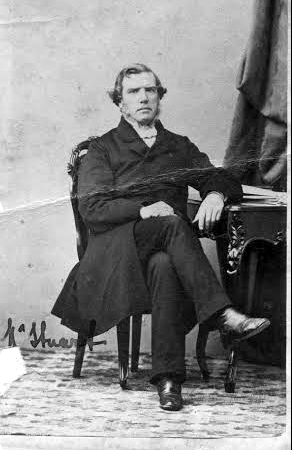

Personal details
- Born: 29 February 1812 (leap day) Bolton
- Died: 23 November 1887 Leghorn

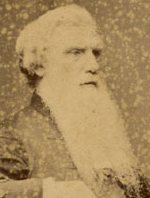
Robert Walter Stewart

Robert Walter Stewart (1812–1887) was a Scottish minister of the Free Church of Scotland and who spent much time working in Italy and served as Moderator of the General Assembly 1874/75. He helped to promote the Waldensian Church and the Presbyterian movement in northern Italy. He was also a travel writer and early photographer.

Being independently wealthy he frequently detached himself from his religious duties for extended holidays. However, he was a noted philanthropist and put both time and money into the promotion of the Presbyterian Church in Italy.

== Life ==
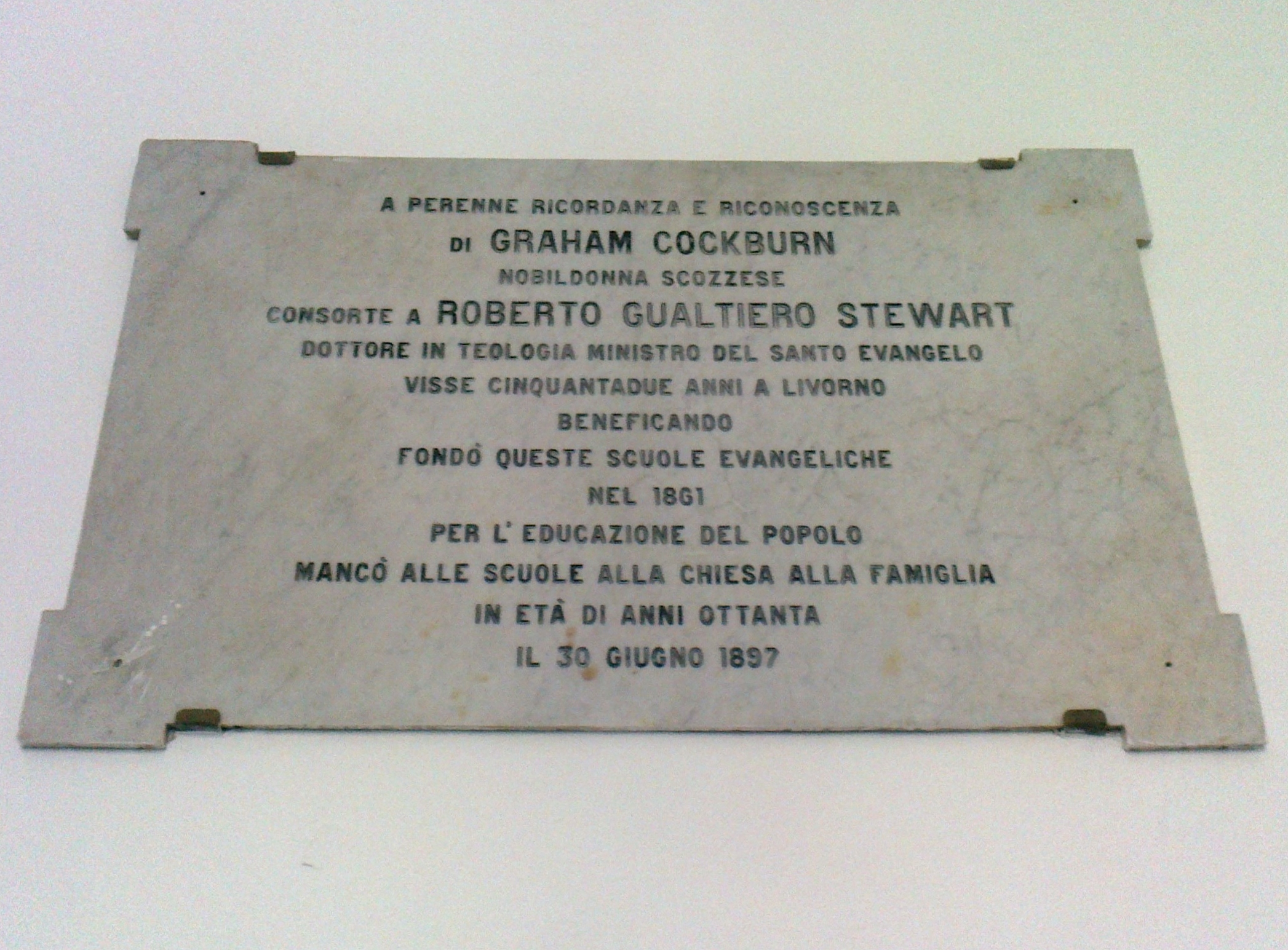
Plaque to Robert Walter Stewart and his wife in the Scots Church in Livorno

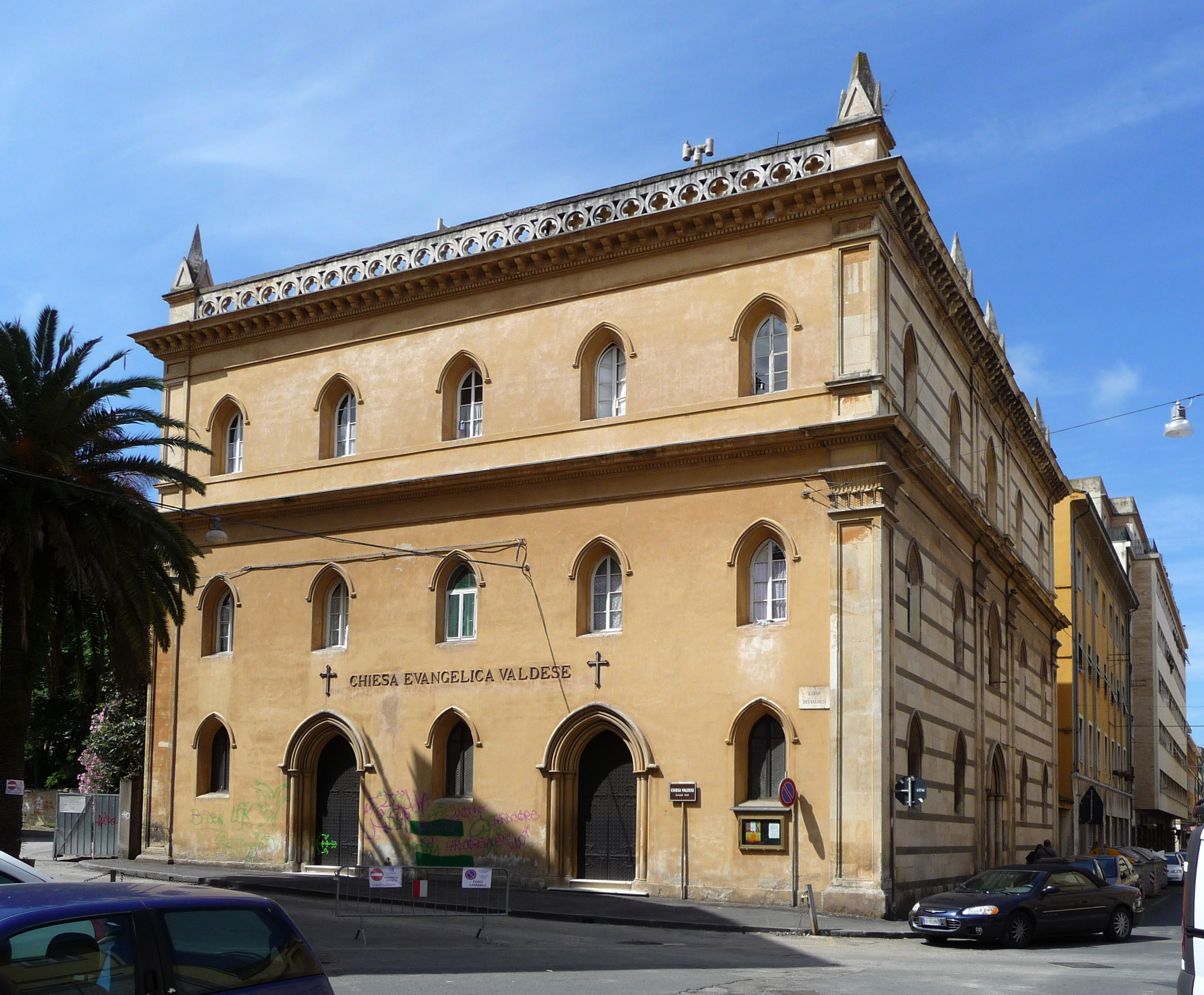
The Scottish church in Livorno

He was born in Bolton, East Lothian, on 29 February 1812. He was the oldest son of Andrew Stewart, and the Hon Margaret Stuart, only daughter of Alexander Stuart, the 10th Lord Blantyre. The family moved to Rome in 1829 and Robert became fluent in Italian as a result.

He was returned to Scotland to study theology at Glasgow University, spending one term also in both Edinburgh University and the University of Geneva. He was licensed to preach in 1830 and spent time assisting at Greenock.

He was ordained by the Church of Scotland at his father's church in Erskine in 1837. He appears to have had a constant yearning to be in Italy, and made frequent trips there on grounds of ill-health, his ministerial duties at Erskine being then fulfilled by his assistant. At the point of the Disruption of 1843 that is to say the General Assembly of the Church of Scotland in the summer of 1843, he was in Malta where he had been for at least six months. He had also spent some time in Constantinople where he met Rev Dr Carl Schwartz. Having had prior warning of the likely importance of the meeting, he set off on a return journey (by ship) immediately on hearing the news. He arrived in Edinburgh on 23 May in time for the Assembly, and is one of the 470 signatures on the Act of Separation.

In 1844 he returned to Italy and settled in Leghorn, where he ran the Bethel Scots Church and the Harbour Mission. In Italy he founded several Presbyterian churches, mainly aimed at serving the needs of British tourists (and sailors), therefore focussed on the major seaside towns and the larger cities. He worked closely with the Waldensian Church at promoting their own expansion. During the establishment of the Tuscan Constitution in 1848/49 he strongly supported the cause and spoke at Lucca and Livorno. In 1849 he relocated to serve the Free Church in Florence. In 1849 he founded a Scots Church in Livorno. He recruited Bartolomeo Malan and Paulo Geymonat to run the church as sympathetic local people.

Princeton University awarded him an honorary doctorate (DD) in 1849.

In 1853 he began an extended tour of the Middle East which lasted four years. On his return in 1857 he helped to establish churches at Piedmont and in Sardinia. In 1860 he placed Pastor Giovanni Ribetti in the Livorno church. In 1871 he bought the entire library of Luigi Desanctis and gifted it to the Livorno library. He further increased this in 1877 when he purchased 900 bibles owned by Tito Chiesi and gifted these to the library.

During this trip (and in his Italian travels) he took many photographs and these represent an early record of these areas.

In the summer of 1874 he made a rare return to Scotland, specifically to serve as Moderator of the General Assembly to the Free Church of Scotland, in succession to Rev Alexander Duff.

In 1883 he was present at the inauguration of the Waldesian Church in Rome, for which he had purchased and gifted the site in 1870 with the aim of increasing the number of Presbyterian students in Rome.

He died in Livorno on 23 November 1887. He is buried there in the English Cemetery.

The Harbour Mission in Livorno was rebuilt as the Seamens Mission in 1913.

== Family ==
He married 3 September 1839, Graham (sic) (died 30 June 1897), daughter of Henry Cockburn, Lord Cockburn and Elizabeth Macdowall, and had issue —

- Henry Cockburn, C.M.G., administrator, Seychelles, born 21 July 1840, died 5 June 1899
- Margaret Catherine, born 16 April 1842, died 4 December 1913
- Elizabeth Georgina Frances, born 26 July 1844 (married 29 March 1865, the Rev. James Collie), died 23 July 1908
- Charles Francis, born at Leghorn, 2 October 1846, died 22 July 1847
- Robert Walter, born 26 April 1848, died 14 July 1849
- Alexander David, born 19 September 1852, died 13 March 1899
- Walter Charles (twin), born 19 September 1852, died 23 July 1908
- Louisa Caroline Graham, born 19 November 1855 (married 1883, James Wood Brown, M.A., minister of the Free Church, Gordon, Berwickshire).

== Legacy ==
Addressing the General Assembly of 1869, Signor Prochet said : "You claim Dr Stewart as one of yourselves, bone of your bone and flesh of your flesh, and you may well do so, because in the land in which he has been living for thirty years, he has taught not only the Protestants but the Roman Catholics to respect and esteem Scotland and Scottish Protestants. But, if you claim him as yours, we also claim him as being ours. He has not been thirty years by our side, if not to become part of us. It is true, I have no parchment to show to you with the name of Dr Stewart saying that he has become a citizen of the Waldensian Alps. But, if ever you come to those valleys, I will show you 20,000 living hearts upon which his name is written in characters that can never be blotted out."

== Publications ==
- Commentary on the Four Gospels (in Italian)
- Religion in Southern Europe
- On the Present Condition of the Waldensian Church (1845)
- The Tent and the Khan (1857)
- La Rivista Cristiana (1871)
- Evangelical Work on the Continent of Europe (1876)
