= Queen Street, Edinburgh =

Street in Edinburgh, Scotland

Coordinates: 55.95468°N 3.19962°W

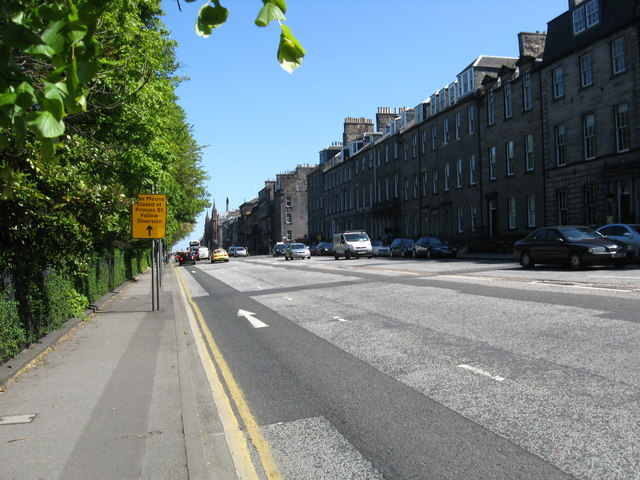
Queen Street, Edinburgh

Queen Street is the northernmost east-west street in Edinburgh's First New Town. It begins in the east, at the Scottish National Portrait Gallery. It links York Place with the Moray Estate.

It was named "Queen Street" after the British queen Charlotte of Mecklenburg-Strelitz, and was so named on James Craig's plan of the New Town issued by the Town Council in 1768. Most early maps repeat this name but others misname it Queen's Street or Queens Street.

== History ==
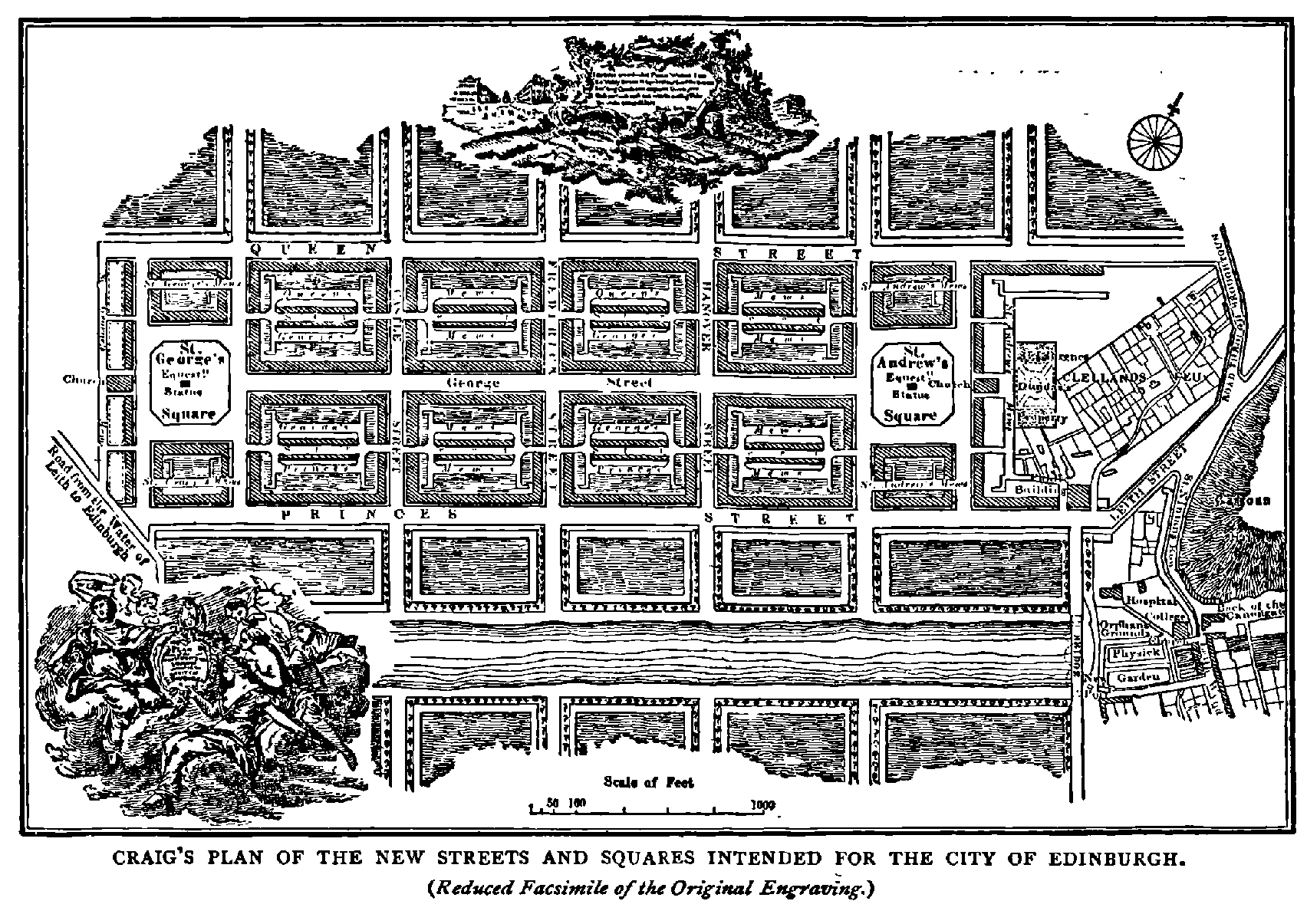
Plan of Edinburgh New Town

The street forms part of James Craig's plan of 1768 for a New Town to the north of Edinburgh's Old Town and the North Loch. This had three main east-west streets: Princes Street; George Street; and Queen Street.

Queen Street was planned as a one-sided street, facing north over then fields towards the Firth of Forth. The first 30 metres beyond the road itself was originally laid out as private individual gardens to some of the Queen Street residents. Not until the opposite side was developed was there pressure to combine these gardens as a communal (but private) garden serving both Queen Street to the south and Heriot Row and Abercromby Place to the north. From 1840 this was known as Queen Street Gardens, which form part the collection of New Town Gardens.

The street is planned as four terraces of equal length, originally all three storey and basement in form. Building began at the east end in 1769, one of the first being No 8 which was designed for Baron Orde by Robert Adam, completed in 1771. Feuing continued piecemeal and was complete by 1792.

The skew on the final two blocks at the west end (leading to North Charlotte Street and from there to Charlotte Square) result from an unresolved feuing argument with Lord Moray, who later built the Moray Estate on the land west of Queen Street.

When Leith amalgamated with Edinburgh in 1920, the city gained a second Queen Street. This was renamed Shore Place in 1966.

== Buildings of note ==
- 1 - Scottish National Portrait Gallery
- 10 - Royal College of Physicians of Edinburgh
- 28 - Scotch Malt Whisky Society
- 43 - Former St Andrew's and St George's Church Halls, the streets only Gothic frontage
- Yotel - on the site of The Mary Erskine School

== Notable residents ==
- 2 - Patrick Wilson (architect) and his son Robert Wilson (demolished)
- 2 - John McLachlan (architect) (demolished)
- 3 - Patrick Dudgeon
- 8 - Robert Ord (special commission by Robert Adam)
- 8 - Robert Lee, Lord Lee
- 12 - James Campbell Noble,Hugh Cameron RSA and George Hay RSA
- 18 - James Jardine (engineer)
- 21 - Alexander Keiller (physician)
- 22 - James Lorimer (advocate)
- 22 - William Bindon Blood
- 22 - Rev K. M. Phin
- 22 - Prof Simon Somerville Laurie
- 22 - Rev Aeneas Francon Williams and his family
- 31 - James Kinnear
- 43 - Alexander Moody Stuart
- 47 - Charles Neaves, Lord Neaves
- 48 - Francis Brodie Imlach
- 51 - James Miller (surgeon)
- 51 - Arthur Mitchell (physician)
- 51 - John Sibbald
- 52 - James Young Simpson
- 52 - Alexander Russell Simpson
- 53 - James Dunsmure (physician)
- 55 and 59 - Dionysius Wielobycki
- 62 - Robert Frier artist
- 64 - Robert Wemyss the Earl of Wemyss and March (special Commission)
- 66 - General Ralph Abercromby (special commission)
- 68 - George Joseph Bell
- 69 - Patrick Dalmahoy WS and his daughters
- 73 - John Henderson (architect)
