= List of presidents of the Royal College of Physicians of Edinburgh =

This is an incomplete list of the presidents of the Royal College of Physicians of Edinburgh, which was granted its Royal Charter by Charles II in 1681.

== List of presidents ==
Image	President	Took office	Left office	Notes
	Professor Mark Strachan	2026	Present	
	Professor Andrew Elder	2021	2026	
	Professor Angela Thomas	2020	2021	Acting President
	Professor Andrew Elder	2020	2020	
	Professor Derek Bell	2014	2020	
	Dr Neil Dewhurst	2010	2014	
	Professor Sir Neil Douglas	2004	2010	
	Dr Niall Finlayson	2001	2004	
	Professor James Petrie	1997	2001	
	Dr John D Cash	1994	1997	
	Dr Anthony Toft	1991	1994	
	Professor John Richmond	1988	1991	
	Professor Michael Oliver	1985	1988	
	Professor Ronald Girdwood	1982	1985	
	Professor John Strong	1979	1982	
	Dr Ronald Robertson	1976	1979	
	Professor Sir John Wenman Crofton	1973	1976	
	Sir John Halliday Croom	1970	1973	
	Dr Christopher William Clayson	1966	1969	
	Sir Ian George Wilson Hill	1963	1966	
	Sir James Davidson Stuart Cameron	1960	1963	
	Dr Andrew Rae Gilchrist	1957	1960	
	Sir Leybourne Stanley Patrick Davidson	1953	1957	
	William Alister Alexander	1951	1953	
	Sir David Kennedy Henderson	1949	1951	
	William Douglas Denton Small	1947	1949	
	David Murray Lyon	1945	1947	
	Andrew Fergus Hewat	1943	1945	
	Charles McNeil	1940	1943	
	Alexander Goodall	1937	1940	
	Professor William Thomas Ritchie	1935	1937	
	Edwin Bramwell	1933	1935	Son of Byrom Bramwell (see below)
	Robert Thin	1931	1933	
	Norman Purvis Walker	1929	1931	
	Robert Alexander Fleming	1927	1929	
	George Matthew Robertson	1925	1927	
	George Lovell Gulland	1923	1925	
	Sir Robert William Philip	1918	1923	
	Professor William Russell	1916	1918	
	Alexander Hugh Freeland Barbour	1914	1916	
	John James Graham Brown	1912	1914	Son of Thomas Brown Free Church moderator. Lecturer in Neurology at University of Edinburgh; Born 6 September 1853; died 1925
	Sir Byrom Bramwell	1910	1912	
	Sir William Allan Jamieson	1908	1910	
	John Playfair	1908	1908	
	Charles Edward Underhill	1906	1908	Died in office
	John Playfair	1904	1906	
	Sir Thomas Smith Clouston	1902	1904	
	Sir Thomas Richard Fraser	1900	1902	
	James Andrew	1898	1900	
	Sir John Batty Tuke	1895	1898	
	Sir William Tennant Gairdner	1893	1895	
	Sir Alexander Russell Simpson	1891	1893	
	Sir Thomas Grainger Stewart	1889	1891	
	Robert Peel Ritchie	1887	1889	
	Andrew Douglas Maclagan	1884	1887	
	George William Balfour	1882	1884	
	Daniel Rutherford Haldane	1879	1882	
	Alexander Peddie	1877	1879	
	Alexander Keiller	1875	1877	
	William Henry Lowe	1873	1875	
	Robert Paterson	1871	1873	
	Andrew Halliday Douglas	1869	1871	
	Dr John Moir	1867	1869	
	Dr John Smith	1865	1867	
	John Graham MacDonald Burt	1863	1865	
	Dr David Craigie	1861	1863	
	Alexander Wood	1858	1861	
	David Maclagan	1856	1857	
	James Begbie	1854	1856	
	Thomas Stewart Traill	1852	1854	
	Sir James Young Simpson	1850	1852	
	Dr William Seller	1848	1850	
	Sir Robert Christison	1846	1848	2nd term
	William Beilby	1844	1846	
	Robert Renton	1842	1844	
	Robert Graham	1840	1842	
	Sir Robert Christison	1838	1840	1st term
	William Alison	1836	1838	
	John Thomson	1834	1836	
	Dr Joshua Henry Davidson	1833	1834	2nd term
	Dr John MacWhirter	1831	1833	
	Dr Joshua Henry Davidson	1829	1831	1st term
	Dr Alexander Morison	1827	1829	
	Dr Alexander Monro	1825	1827	
	Dr Andrew Duncan, Snr	1824	1825	
	Andrew Duncan, Jnr	1822	1824	
	Dr James Buchan	1819	1822	
	Dr Thomas Charles Hope	1815	1819	
	Dr James Hamilton (the Younger)	1812	1815	
	Dr James Home	1809	1812	
	Dr Charles Stuart	1806	1809	
	Dr Thomas Spens	1803	1806	son of Nathaniel Spens (see below)
	Dr William Wright	1801	1803	
	Dr James Gregory	1798	1801	
	Dr Daniel Rutherford	1796	1798	
	Dr Nathaniel Spens	1794	1796	
	Dr James Hamilton the Elder	1792	1794	
	Dr Andrew Duncan, Snr	1790	1792	
	Dr Joseph Black	1788	1790	
	Dr James Hay	1786	1788	
	Dr John Hope	1784	1786	
	Dr John Gardiner	1782	1784	
	Dr Alexander Monro	1779	1782	
	Dr Gregory Grant	1777	1779	
	Dr Francis Home	1775	1777	
	Dr William Cullen	1773	1775	
	Dr Colin Drummond	1772	1773	
	Dr John Boswell	1770	1772	
	Sir Stuart Threipland	1766	1770	
	Dr Robert Whytt	1763	1766	
	Sir Alexander Dick, Bt	1756	1763	
	Dr John Rutherford	1752	1756	
	Dr William Porterfield	1748	1752	
	Dr William Cochran	1744	1748	
	Dr John Clerk	1740	1744	
	Dr Robert Lowis	1735	1740	
	Dr John Riddell	1731	1735	
	Dr Francis Pringle	1727	1731	
	Dr John Drummond	1722	1727	
	Dr James Forrest	1719	1722	
	Dr William Stewart	1716	1719	
	Dr Matthew Sinclare	1708	1716	
	Dr William Eccles	1706	1708	
	Dr James Halket	1704	1706	
	Dr Alexander Dundas	1702	1704	
	Dr Robert Trotter	1700	1702	
	Dr Matthew Sinclare	1698	1700	
	Sir Thomas Burnet	1696	1698	
	Dr Robert Trotter	1694	1698	
	Sir Archibald Stevenson	1694	1694	2nd term
	Sir Andrew Balfour	1685	?	
	Sir Robert Sibbald	1684	1685	
	Sir Archibald Stevenson	1681	1684	1st term, elected ‘at the inaugural meeting of the College on 18 January 1682’

== See also ==
- List of presidents of the Royal College of Surgeons of Edinburgh
- List of presidents of the Royal College of Physicians
