= Edwin Bramwell =

British neurologist

Edwin Bramwell FRSE FRCPE
- Born: 11 January 1873; North Shields, Northumberland, England
- Died: 21 March 1952 (aged 79); Edinburgh, Scotland
- Burial place: Dean Cemetery, Edinburgh
- Education: University of Edinburgh
- Occupations: Physician, Neurologist
- Title: President of the Royal College of Physicians of Edinburgh
- Term: 1933-1935
- Predecessor: Robert Thin
- Successor: Professor William Thomas Ritchie
- Spouse: Elizabeth Cumming Cunningham (married 1908-1960, her death)
- Children: 4 daughters, 2 sons.
- Parents: Sir Byrom Bramwell; Martha Crighton

Edwin Bramwell FRSE FRCPE (11 January 1873 – 21 March 1952) was a British neurologist. He was President of the Royal College of Physicians of Edinburgh from 1933 to 1935.

== Life ==
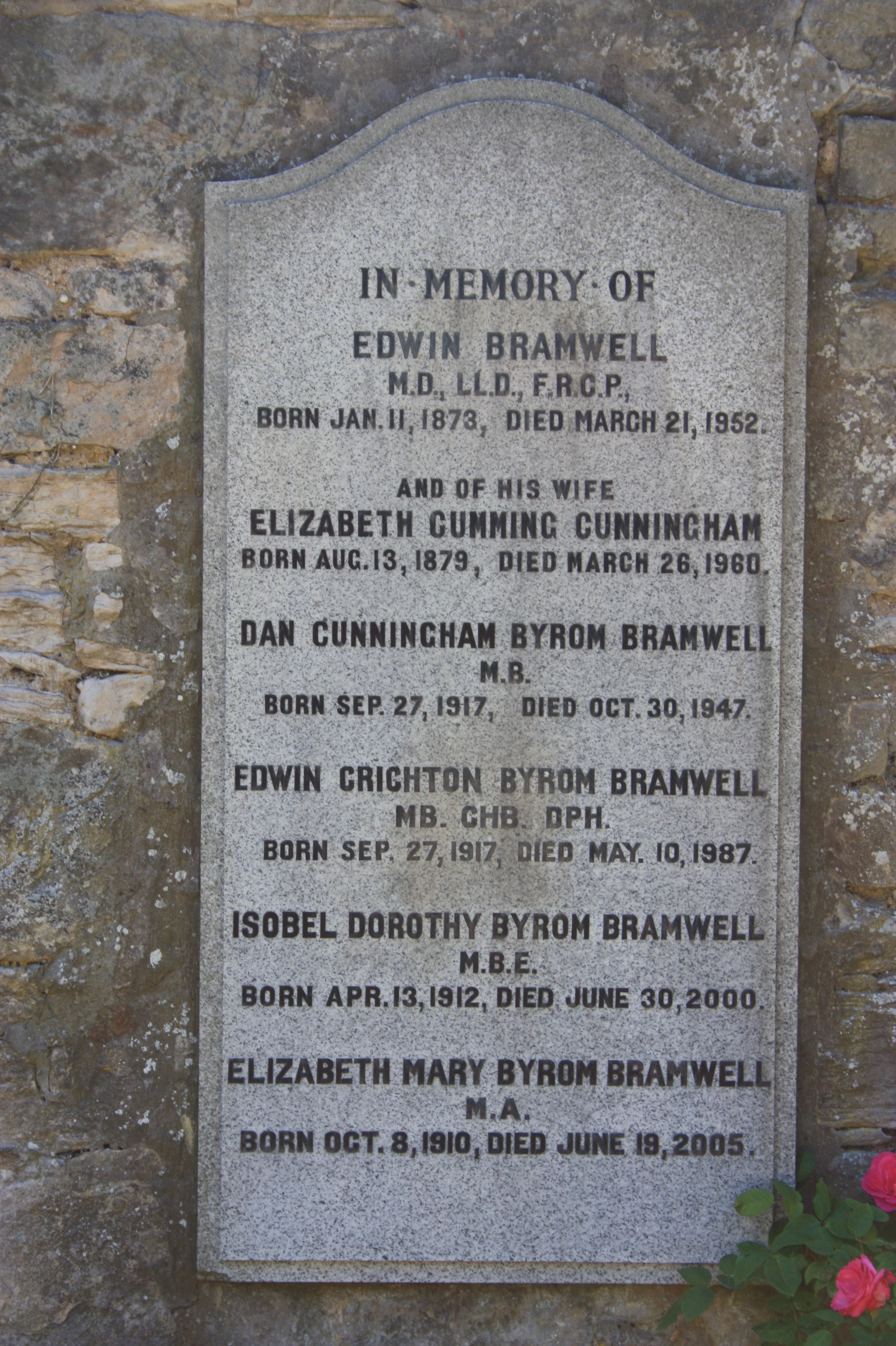
The grave of Edwin Bramwell, Dean Cemetery

He was born in North Shields on 11 January 1873 the son of Martha (née Crighton) and Sir Byrom Bramwell. He was educated at Cheltenham College. He then studied medicine at the University of Edinburgh graduating MB ChB in 1896.

After graduation he began working at the Edinburgh Royal Infirmary then moved to the National Hospital for the Paralysed and Epileptic in London. He then did a years further postgraduate study in Freiburg in Germany. In 1900 he settled in Edinburgh as a consultant and in 1902 moved to work in Leith Hospital as Assistant Physician. In 1907 he returned to Edinburgh Royal Infirmary as Assistant Physician.

In 1906 Bramwell was elected a member of the Harveian Society of Edinburgh and served as President in 1934. In 1906 he was also elected a Fellow of the Royal Society of Edinburgh. His proposers were Daniel John Cunningham, John Chiene, George Chrystal and Alexander Bruce. At this time he lived at 24 Walker Street in Edinburgh's West End.

In the First World War he served in the 2nd Second General Hospital treating the returning wounded. He began to specialise in brain injuries and mental injuries such as shell shock and in 1919 began lecturing in Neurology at the University of Edinburgh. In 1922 he became Professor of Clinical Medicine. In 1927 he was elected a member of the Aesculapian Club.

He died in Edinburgh on 21 March 1952. He is buried in Dean Cemetery. The grave lies on the westmost outer wall of the first northern extension.

== Publications ==
A keen fly-fisher, he wrote many articles for the Fishing Gazette under the pseudonym "The Professor".

== Family ==
In 1908 he married Elizabeth Cumming Cunningham (1879-1960) daughter of Daniel John Cunningham and granddaughter of Very Rev John Cunningham. They had four daughters and two sons. One daughter Margaret Claire Byrom Bramwell married Dr James Kirkwood Slater.

His younger brothers were J. Crighton Bramwell and Byrom Stanley Bramwell.

Academic offices
Preceded by Robert Thin	President of the Royal College of Physicians of Edinburgh; 1933–1935	Succeeded by Professor William Thomas Ritchie
