= James Kirkwood Slater =

British neurologist (1900–1965)

Dr James Kirkwood Slater OBE FRSE FRCPE (1900 – 8 October 1965) was a 20th-century British neurologist.

== Life ==
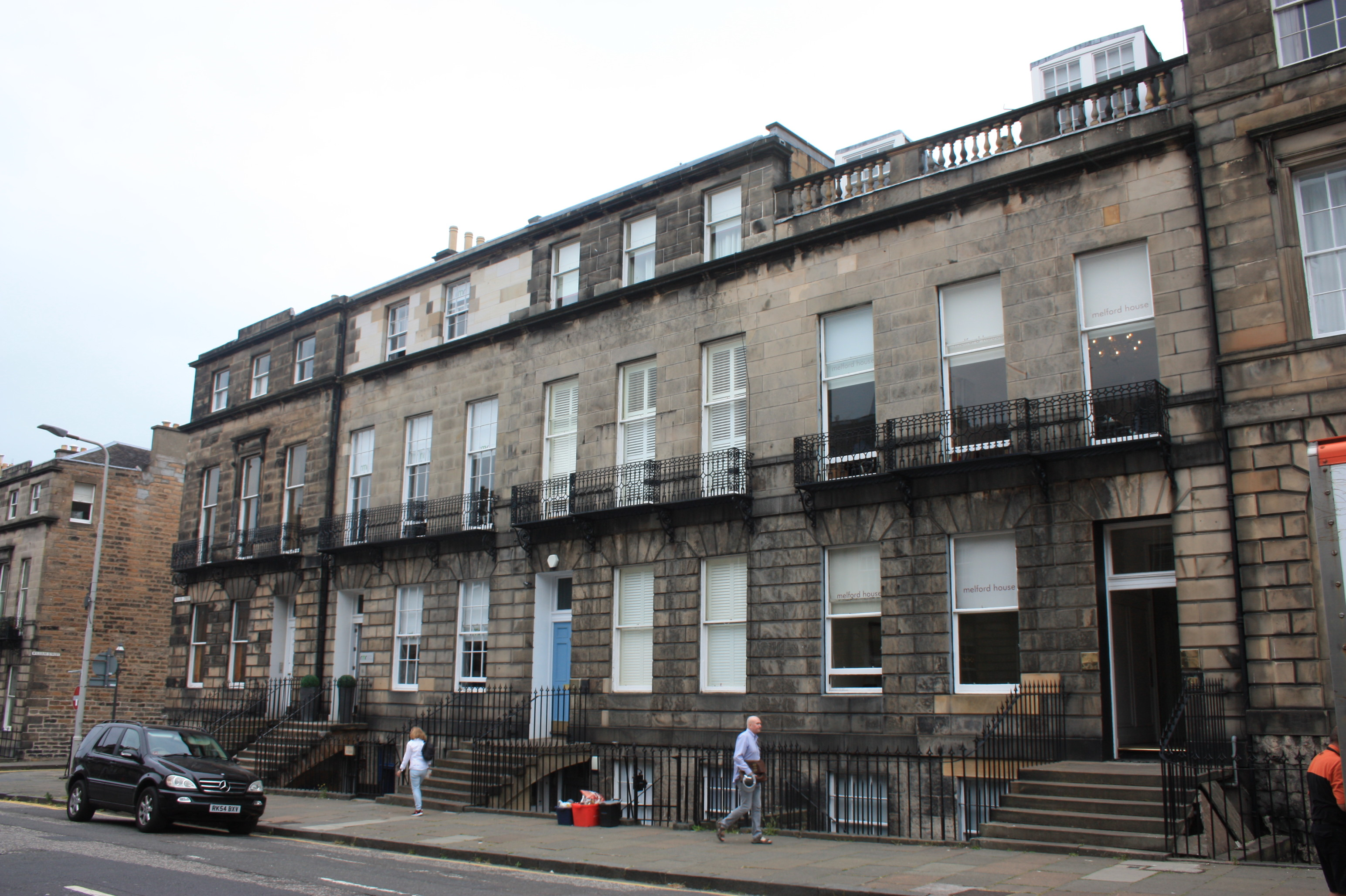
3 to 9 Walker Street, Edinburgh

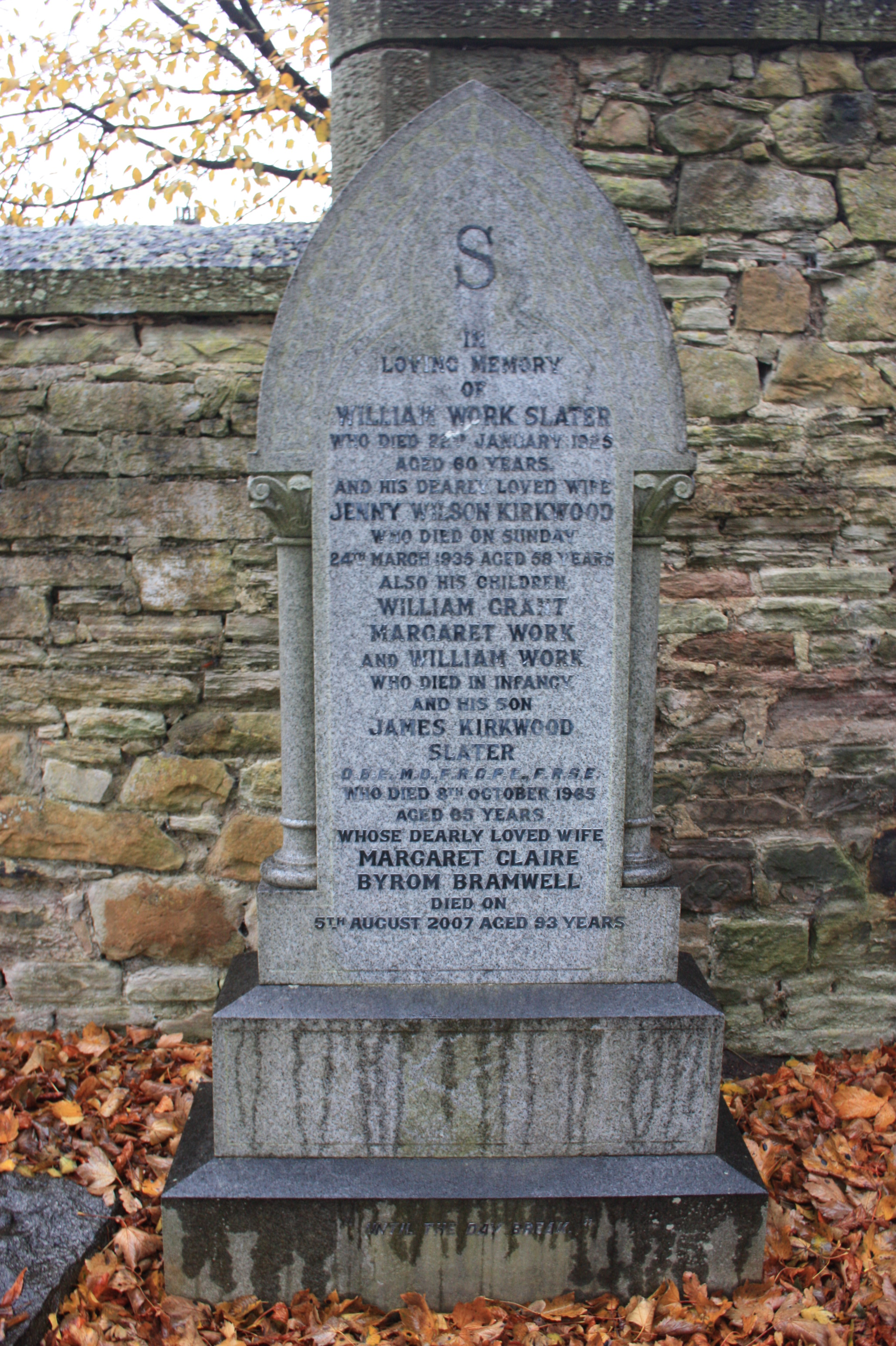
The grave of James Kirkwood Slater, Morningside Cemetery

He was born in 1900 the son of William Work Slater and his wife, Jenny Wilson Kirkwood. The family lived at "Westfield" a villa on Colinton Road in Edinburgh, and his father had offices at 13 Rutland Square.

Slater was educated at Edinburgh Academy 1914 to 1917. He then studied medicine at the University of Edinburgh graduating MB ChB in 1924. He then became Physician at the Edinburgh Royal Infirmary then Consulting Physician at the Deaconess Hospital. He also lectured in clinical neurology at the University of Edinburgh.

In 1937 he was elected a Fellow of the Royal Society of Edinburgh. His proposers were Sir Robert William Philip, Arthur Logan Turner, Sir Sydney Alfred Smith, and Edwin Bramwell.

In the Second World War he served in the Royal Army Medical Corps in Italy and received a military OBE in 1944.

In the 1950s he was Senior Psychiatric Registrar. He was then living at 7 Walker Street in Edinburgh's West End. In 1952 he was elected a member of the Aesculapian Club. In 1961 he was elected President of the Harveian Society of Edinburgh.

He was a contemporary of Sir Walter Mercer.

He died in Edinburgh on 8 October 1965. He is buried in Morningside Cemetery, Edinburgh. The grave lies on the south wall towards the south-west.

== Family ==
He married Margaret Claire Byrom Bramwell, daughter of Dr Edwin Bramwell.

Their children include Admiral Jock Slater.
