= Robert Thin =

Scottish physician

Robert Thin FRCPE
- Born: 1861
- Died: 18 September 1941 (aged 79–80)
- Education: University of Edinburgh
- Title: President of the Royal College of Physicians of Edinburgh
- Term: 1931-33
- Predecessor: Norman Purvis Walker
- Successor: Edwin Bramwell
- Spouse: Mary Glover Wright (married 1894)
- Children: 2 daughters, 1 son
- Parents: James Thin; Catherine Traquair

Robert Thin PRCPE (1861–1941) was a 20th-century Scottish physician who served as President of the Royal College of Physicians of Edinburgh from 1931 to 1933, and was the first GP in this role.

== Life ==
He was born at 54 South Bridge in Edinburgh in 1861 the youngest (and seventh) son of Catherine Traquair and her husband, James Thin, a bookseller. The family moved to a villa at 7 Rillbank Terrace in the Grange in his youth, as his father's company grew.

He was educated at the Royal High School then took a general degree at the University of Edinburgh graduating with an MA in 1883, allowing him to then study medicine and graduating with an MB ChB in 1887. Following graduation he became house surgeon to Professor John Chiene.

He was then House Physician to Dr John Wylie at the Edinburgh Royal Infirmary on Lauriston Place before going to the Sick Children's Hospital, Edinburgh. He then became a general practitioner.

In 1910 he was living at 25 Abercromby Place in Edinburgh's New Town.

He lived his final years at 6 Albany Street. In 1891 Thin was elected a member of the Harveian Society of Edinburgh and served as President in 1928. In 1927 he was elected a member of the Aesculapian Club.

He died in Edinburgh on 18 September 1941.

== Family ==
He married Mary Glover Wright in 1894 and together they had three children, 2 daughters and a son.

He was grandfather to Dr Robert Nicol Traquair Thin.

== Artistic recognition ==
His portrait by Henry Wright Kerr is held by the Royal College of Physicians of Edinburgh.

Academic offices
Preceded by Norman Purvis Walker	President of the Royal College of Physicians of Edinburgh; 1931-33	Succeeded by Edwin Bramwell
