= Thomas Spens (physician) =

Scottish physician

Dr Thomas Spens PRCPE FRSE
- Born: 1764; Lathallan, Fife, Scotland
- Died: May 27, 1842 (aged 77–78); Edinburgh, Scotland
- Education: University of Edinburgh
- Occupation: Physician
- Title: President of the Royal College of Physicians of Edinburgh
- Term: 1803-1806
- Predecessor: William Wright
- Successor: Charles Stuart
- Spouse: Bethia Wood
- Children: James Spens, Nathaniel Spens, Helen Spens
- Father: Nathaniel Spens PRCPE
- Family: Clan Spens

Dr Thomas Spens PRCPE FRSE (1764–1842) was an 18th/19th century Scottish physician who served as

President of the Royal College of Physicians of Edinburgh from 1803 to 1806.

He was one of the first writers to provide a written report on what is now called cardiovascular syncope or Adams-Stokes syndrome.

== Life ==
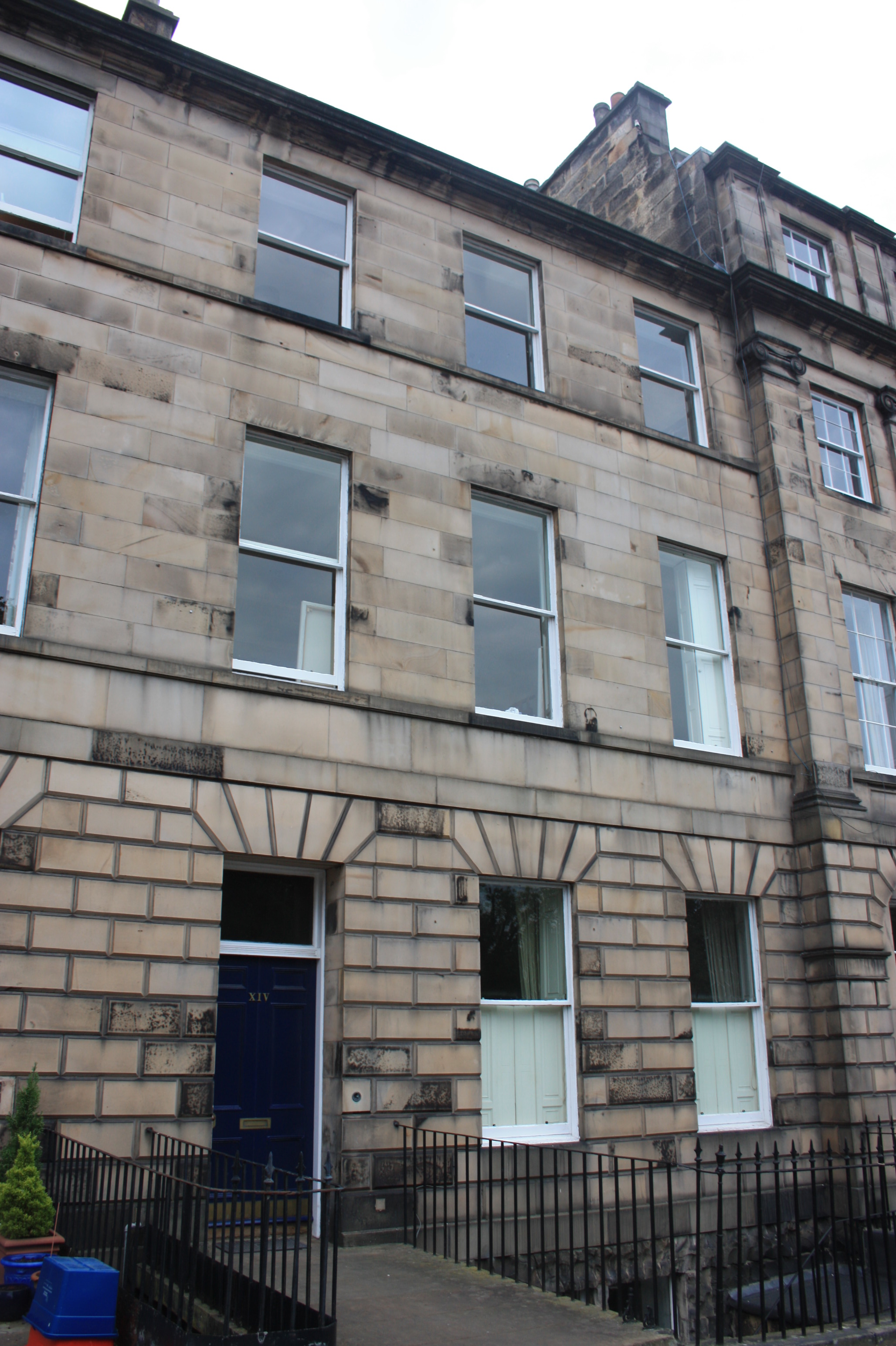
14 Drummond Place, Edinburgh

He was born in 1764 the son of Nathaniel Spens of Lathallan in north-east Fife. The Spens family owned the estate of Lathallan in Fife and his grandfather was Thomas Spens, 15th Laird of Lathallan

Spens studied medicine at the University of Edinburgh earning his MD in 1784. At this time he lived with his parents on Niddry's Wynd off the Royal Mile in Edinburgh (now known as Niddry Street).

In 1788 he was elected a Fellow of the Royal Society of Edinburgh. His proposers were Dr James Gregory, Sir James Hall, and Andrew Duncan, the elder. He was a physician at Edinburgh Royal Infirmary and Edinburgh Lunatic Asylum. In 1789 he was elected a member of the Aesculapian Club.

In 1789 he was elected a Fellow of the Royal College of Physicians of Edinburgh. By 1794 his father was living at 13 Horse Wynd at the foot of the Canongate near Holyrood Palace and Thomas is presumed to still live with him.

In 1799 Spens was elected a member of the Harveian Society of Edinburgh, serving as president in 1808.

In 1803 he succeeded Dr William Wright as President of the Royal College of Physicians of Edinburgh, having previously served as the college Treasurer. Like his father he was a member of the Royal Company of Archers (the monarch's bodyguard in Scotland), and presented his father's yew bow to the Company where it remains on display. He was succeeded in his role as president by Charles Stuart of Dunearn.

By 1810 his father had retired and Thomas was running his practice on Horse Wynd.

He disappears from Edinburgh records in the 1820s and reappears around 1830 at Drummond Place in Edinburgh's Second New Town.

He died at home 14 Drummond Place on 27 May 1842.

== Family ==
He had one son, James Spens (1797-1870), by an early relationship. As James did not inherit from his father he was presumably illegitimate.

His wife Bethia Wood (1781-1867) outlived him and lived at Drummond Place with their son Nathaniel Spens WS (b.1801) and a daughter Helen (b.1821).

== Description of Stokes-Adams syndrome ==
The condition now known as cardiovascular syncope was probably first described in 1761 by the Italian Giovanni Battista Morgagni (1682-1771). Spens published in 1793 a case history which has been described as the first published account by a British author of episodes of cardiovascular syncope almost certainly resulting from third degree heart block. The eponymous name relates to the Dublin physicians Robert Adams, who described a case in 1827, and William Stokes, also of Dublin, who published four cases in 1846.

Spens' description preceded both of these. In an article entitled "History of a case in which there took place a remarkable slowness of the pulse", Spens described the case of a previously well man who 'fell to the ground senseless' and 'continued in that state for 5 minutes.' The man's pulse rate was noted to be 24 beats per minute but regular and of normal strength. Several subsequent episodes occurred over the next few days, in some instances accompanied by convulsions and always with a slow regular pulse of normal strength, recorded on one occasion at 10 beats per minute. The patient died after one such episode and no abnormality was found at autopsy. The case report was published in Medical Commentaries for the year 1792, edited by Andrew Duncan.
