= Nathaniel Spens =

Nathaniel Spens (17 Apr 1728 -21 Jun 1815) was a Scottish medical doctor who qualified as Fellow of the Incorporation of Surgeons and then became increasingly interested in the practice of physic. He qualified as a Fellow of the Royal College of Physicians of Edinburgh and went on to become President of that College.

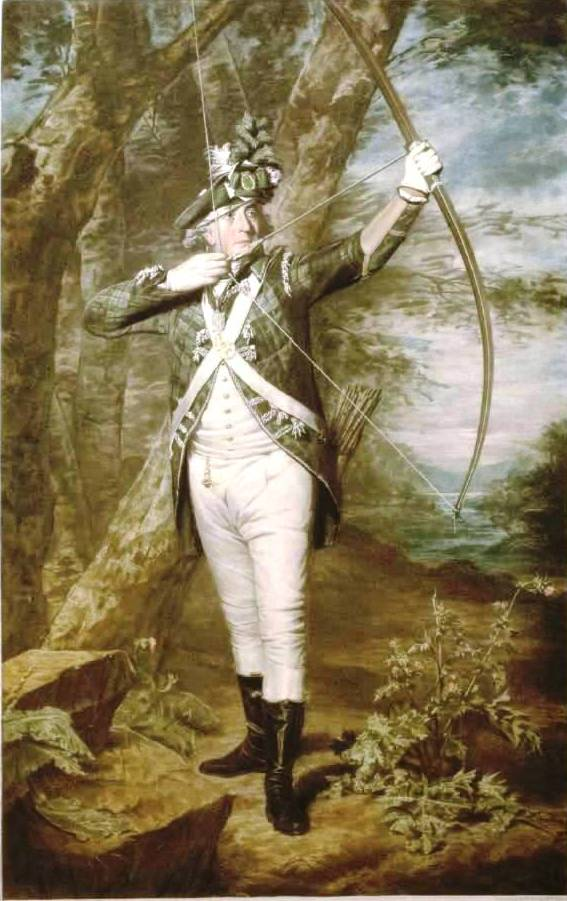
Dr Nathaniel Spens (1728 -1815) in the uniform of the Royal Company of Archers. 1793. Reproduction of the original painting by Sir Henry Raeburn.

== Career ==
Nathaniel Spens was a member of the Spens family who owned the estate of Lathallan in Fife. He was the son of Thomas Spens, 15th Laird of Lathallan and his wife Janet (née Douglas). He was admitted into the Incorporation of Surgeons of Edinburgh on 24 July 1751. He obtained the degree of MD from the University of St Andrews. After practising as a surgeon in Edinburgh, he increasingly became more interested in the practice of physic, becoming a Licentiate of the Royal College of Physicians of Edinburgh in 1773 and fellow of that college the following year. He went on to become treasurer of the college and its president in 1794. In 1773 he was elected a member of the Aesculapian Club. On 12 April 1782 Spens was one of the founding members of the Harveian Society of Edinburgh and served as President in 1789. He purchased in 1792, the estate of Craigsanquhar, in Fife which had once been part of the family estate of Lathallan, but had been sold in 1524.

== Archer ==
Spens was a prominent member of the Royal Company of Archers. The Royal Company of Archers began as a private club in 1676 obtaining its Royal Charter from Queen Anne in 1704. Amongst the prizes for which the Archers compete to this day is the Pagodas Medal, presented to the company by James Spens, son of Nathaniel, in memory of his father. His yew bow, which was presented to the Royal Company by his son Dr Thomas Spens, is still on display in Archers’ Hall. His portrait by Sir Henry Raeburn (1756 - 1823) in the uniform of the Royal Company hangs in Archers' Hall in Edinburgh.

== Freemasonry ==
He was a Scottish Freemason. He was Initiated in Lodge Canongate Kilwinning, No. 2, on 5 June 1751. He served as Master of that Lodge for 1778. He was Substitute Grand Master 1776—82 and Depute Grand Master 1782—86 of the Grand Lodge of Scotland.

== Death and family ==
He died on 21 June 1815. His son, Dr Thomas Spens, was, like his father, a member of the Royal Company of Archers and Treasurer and president of the Royal College of Physicians of Edinburgh. Dr Thomas Spens is credited with the first description of a case of heart block in Britain.
