= Derek Bell (physician) =

Physician

Derek Bell OBE
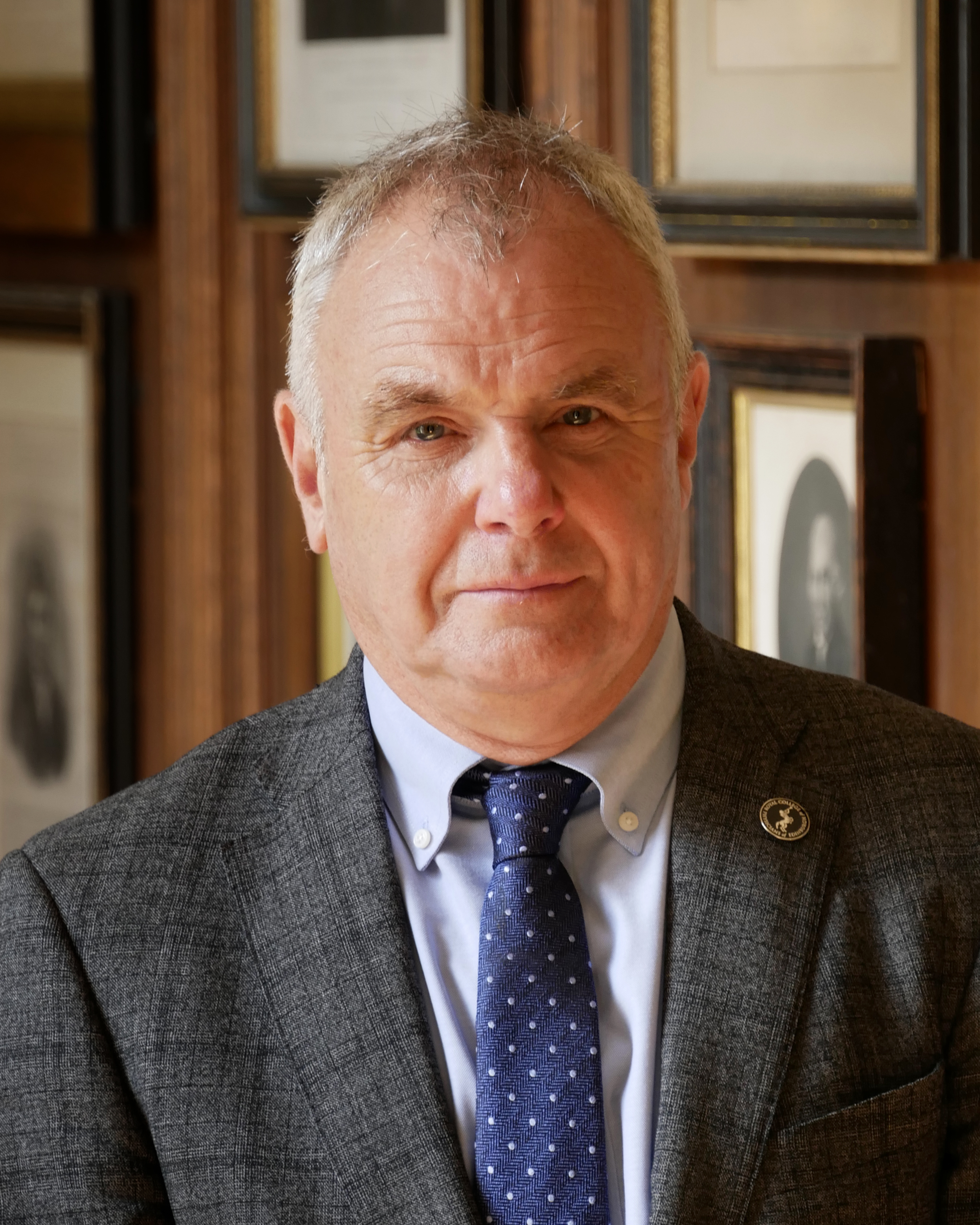
- Education: University of Edinburgh
- Known for: First Professor of Acute Medicine in the UK; President of Royal College of Physicians of Edinburgh; Chair in Acute Medicine (Imperial College London)
- Medical career
- Profession: Physician
- Institutions: President, Royal College of Physicians of Edinburgh (2014 - 2020); Chair in Acute Medicine, Imperial College London; President, Society for Acute Medicine (2000-2003); Director, National Institute for Health Research CLAHRC for Northwest London
- Sub-specialties: Acute medicine

Derek Bell OBE FRCPE was Professor of Acute Medicine at Imperial College London and continues to be an emeritus Professor. He has been a Consultant Physician at Central Middles Hospital, The Royal Infirmary of Edinburgh and most recently at Chelsea and Westminster Hospital NHS Foundation Trust. Appointed as the joint chair of two NHS Trusts in 2021. His initial leadership saw him and others receive parliamentary criticism. Professor Bell was the director of the National Institute for Health Research (NIHR) CLAHRC for Northwest London. He was President (2014 - 2020) of the Royal College of Physicians of Edinburgh, elected in November 2013 he took office on 1 March 2014 succeeding Neil Dewhurst. He was re-elected for a second term on 24 November 2016. He was awarded an OBE in the 2018 New Year Honours for services to Unscheduled Care and Quality Improvement.

He studied at the University of Edinburgh graduating in 1980, and was the UK's first Professor of Acute Medicine. He was elected as the inaugural President of the Society for Acute Medicine (SAM) in 2000, in 2013 he was awarded an Honorary Life Fellowship to SAM.

Professor Bell remains on the General Medical Council register .

Professor Bell continues to play Field Hockey at International Masters Level for Scotland.

In September 2021 he was appointed as the joint chair of North Tees and Hartlepool NHS Foundation Trust and South Tees Hospitals NHS Foundation Trust.

On 18 January 2023 both Trusts announced the move to working together as a formalised hospital group. Under a hospital group model, each trust remains its own statutory organisation.

Professor Bell has undertaken several invited visits to Countries and hospital to review aspects of their system of emergency or urgent care including Australia, Ireland and most recently in 2023 Singapore. He is a Trustee of two medical charities supporting doctors in difficulty and medical research.

As a joint partnership North Tees and Hartlepool NHS Foundation Trust and South Tees Hospitals NHS Foundation Trust serve a population of 1.85 million and employs over 14,700 members of staff with a shared hospital bed count of 1,495 and 40 operating theatres.

The joint partnership remains focused on delivering more together for the population it serves, following a set of key principles which were agreed by the Joint Partnership Board, which are:

- The very best care for everyone

- Equity of access to services and outcomes

- Respect, compassion and dignity in everything they do

- Learning from all, everyone counts

- Improving likes by working together across the communities they serve.

The group model will benefit patients by way of broader collaboration across both organisations, with joint clinical appointments, integration in stroke services and orthopaedics as well as the ongoing joint development of a new community diagnostic centre in Stockton-On-Tees, which will provide patients with quicker access to tests, checks and scans.

Academic offices
Preceded by Neil Dewhurst	President of the Royal College of Physicians of Edinburgh; 2014 - 2020	Succeeded by Andrew Elder
