= Herbert Lindesay Watson Wemyss =

Scottish physician (1855–1933)

Herbert L. W. Wemyss
- Born: 1855; Broughty Ferry, Dundee, Scotland
- Died: February 3, 1933 (aged 77–78)
- Occupation: Physician
- Known for: Work on polycythaemia

Academic background
- Education: Marlborough College; Edinburgh University

Herbert Lindesay Watson Wemyss FRCPE (1855 – 3 February 1933) was a Scottish physician. Contrary to conventional understanding, where splenomegaly was understood to occur as a late finding of polycythemia vera, he reported cases of the disease in which splenomegaly preceded the onset of polycythaemia. He authored a notable paper that outlined the distinction between transient and permanent polycythaemia, extensively documented the microscopic and macroscopic characteristics of bone marrow extracted from living individuals with the disease, and in addition wrote on renal osteodystrophy.

== Early life and education ==
Herbert Lindesay Watson Wemyss was born in Broughty Ferry, Dundee, in 1855. His father was a general practitioner and his grandfather a surgeon of the Edinburgh Royal Infirmary. He was educated at Marlborough College. In 1908, after graduating in medicine from Edinburgh University he became house physician to George Alexander Gibson. He spent a year abroad in Berlin. He received his MD in 1910. He was made a Fellow of the Royal College of Physicians of Edinburgh in 1914.

== Career ==
Early in the war, Wymess joined the Red Cross Society and served as a physician at Dalmeny House Hospital. In 1917, he joined the Royal Army Medical Corps and was posted to Imtarfa Hospital in Malta, where he oversaw the Officers’ Section in a facility treating mainly enteric fever, dysentery, and malaria. His contributions there were considered significant enough to keep him at Imtarfa until his demobilisation in 1919.

Wemyss held positions as Assistant Physician at the Royal Infirmary, Physician at both the Royal Public Dispensary and the Deaconess Hospital, and served as Medical Adviser to the Scottish Life Assurance Company.

Contrary to conventional understanding, where splenomegaly was understood to occur as a late finding of polycythemia vera, he reported cases of the disease in which splenomegaly preceded the onset of polycythaemia. In addition he extensively documented the microscopic and macroscopic characteristics of bone marrow extracted from living individuals with the disease. In 1911 he authored a notable paper that outlined the distinction between transient and permanent polycythaemia. He also wrote on renal osteodystrophy, then termed renal infantilism.

== Death ==
Wemyss died on 3 February 1933, from pneumonia as a complication of influenza.

== Selected publications ==
=== Articles ===
- Watson-Wemyss, H. L. (February 1911). "Erythraemia, with notes on two cases". Edinburgh Medical Journal. 6 (2): 129–155. PMC 5253968.
- Watson-Wemyss, H. L. (2 December 1911). "On the use of the sphygmo-oscillometer of pachon". British Medical Journal. 2 (2657): 1472. doi:10.1136/bmj.2.2657.1472. ISSN 0007-1447. PMC 2332829. PMID 20765896.
- Watson-Wemyss, H. L. (5 April 1913). "A case of Vaquez's disease: polycythaemia with plethora, and splenomegaly". British Medical Journal. 1 (2727): 702–703. doi:10.1136/bmj.1.2727.702. ISSN 0007-1447. PMC 2298839. PMID 20766571.
- Watson-Wemyss, H. L. (December 1922). "Chronic Interstitial Nephritis in Childhood: Renal Infantilism(?): A Clinical Record with Post-Mortem Report". Edinburgh Medical Journal. 29 (6): 300–305. ISSN 0367-1038. PMC 5316617. PMID 29641023.

=== Books ===
- A record of the Edinburgh Harveian Society. Edinburgh: T & A Constable. 1933.

== See also ==
- Harveian Society of Edinburgh
