= Andrew Elder =

Andrew Elder OBE FRCPE FRCP FRCPGlas MACP FAMM
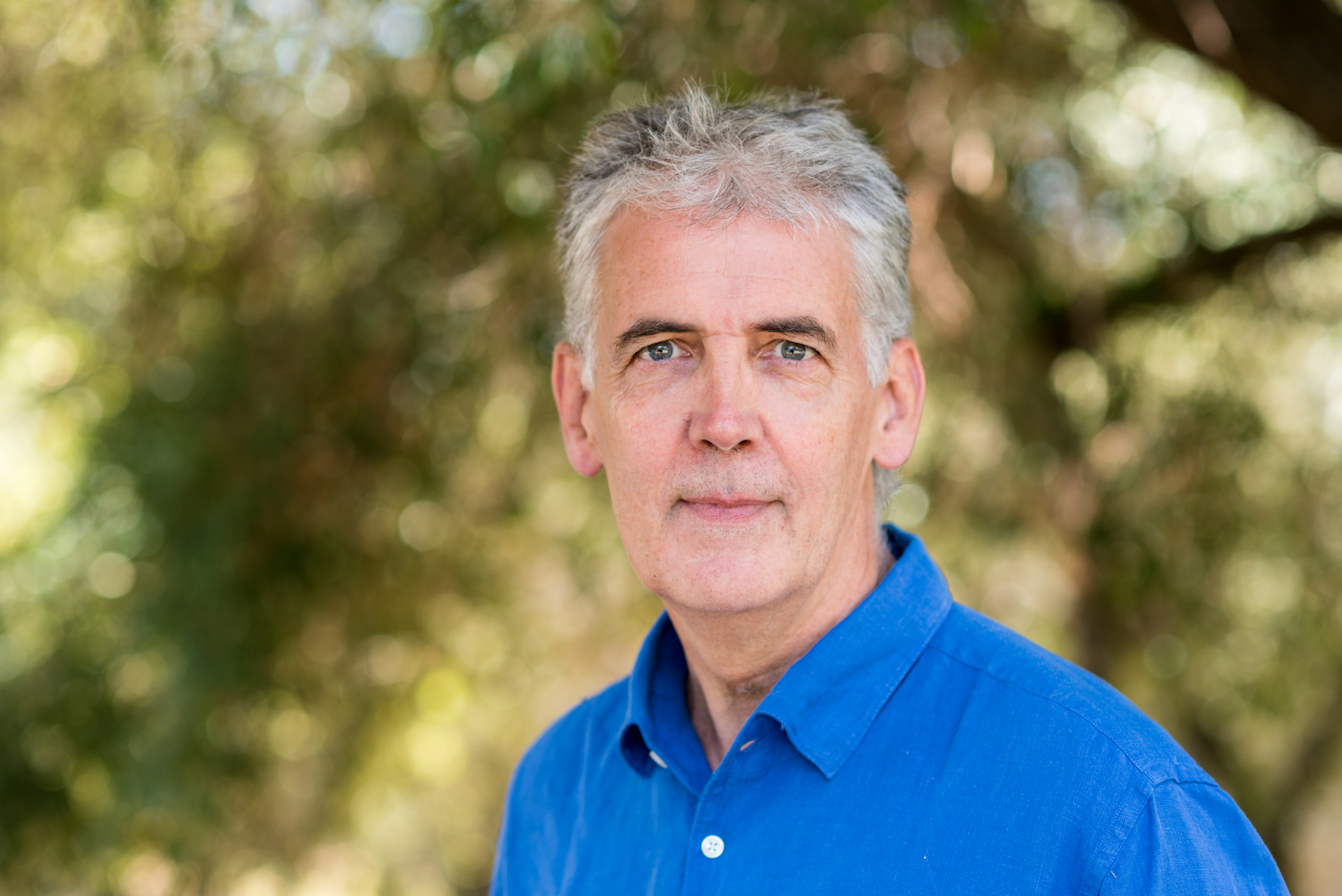
- Andrew Elder at CASBS Stanford in 2018
- Born: 16 November 1958 (age 67); Edinburgh
- Education: University of Edinburgh
- Medical career
- Profession: physician
- Institutions: President, Royal College of Physicians of Edinburgh (2020-); Honorary Professor, University of Edinburgh College of Medicine and Veterinary Medicine
- Sub-specialties: Geriatrics, Acute medicine

Andrew Tyler Elder is a consultant physician in acute medicine for older people, and former medical director of MRCP(UK). He was elected president of the Royal College of Physicians of Edinburgh in 2020 and 2021.

== Biography ==
Andrew Elder qualified in medicine (MBChB) in 1982 from the University of Edinburgh.

He was medical director of MRCP(UK) from 2013 - 2018 and before this the chair of the Clinical Examining Board for MRCP(UK), responsible for the international PACES examination. He is recognised as an expert in the teaching and assessment of the core clinical bedside skills of observation, communication, history taking and physical examination. Two other medical directors of MRCP(UK), Dame Jane Dacre and Dr Neil Dewhurst, have become college presidents, the former for the Royal College of Physicians of London, and the latter for the Royal College of Physicians of Edinburgh. He led the UK Academy of Medical Royal Colleges (AOMRC) Assessment Committee from 2015-2018, and promoted common practices in the detection of plagiarism in high stakes medical examinations and training in unconscious bias for clinical examiners.

He is a visiting professor at Stanford University Medical School on the Stanford 25 Program in Bedside Medicine

In 2015 he was appointed honorary professor at University of Edinburgh College of Medicine and Veterinary Medicine.

In 2018 he became a CASBS Fellow with the Presence Center at Stanford University exploring the impact of the increasing prevalence of frailty and dependency in older age on medical care and society in general. Following this Fellowship he was appointed as Presence Scholar.

In March 2020 he took office as President of the Royal College of Physicians of Edinburgh, resigning on the 29 May 2020. He was re-elected President early in 2021 and assumed office for a second time on 1 June 2021.

Elder was awarded Mastership of the American College of Physicians (MACP) in October 2021, the first doctor practising in Scotland to be so honoured, and only the second in the United Kingdom since inception of the award in 1923.

== OBE Award ==
In his Birthday Honours in June 2026, King Charles III awarded an OBE to Elder for services to Medicine and Medical Education.

Academic offices
Preceded by Derek Bell	President of the Royal College of Physicians of Edinburgh; 2020 - 2020	Succeeded by Angela Thomas (acting president)
