= The Man of Feeling =

1771 book by Henry Mackenzie

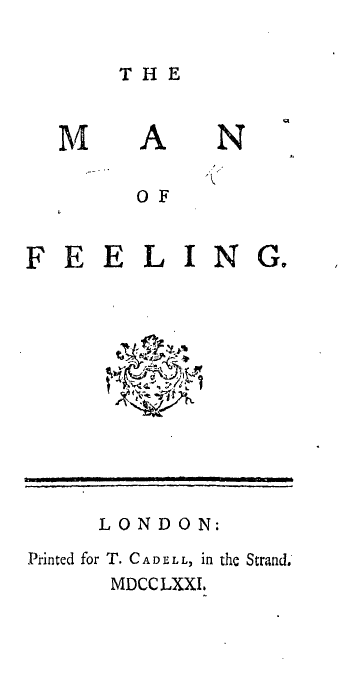
- Title page from the first edition
- Author: Henry Mackenzie
- Language: English
- Publisher: T. Cadell
- Publication date: 1771

The Man of Feeling is a sentimental novel published in 1771, written by Scottish author Henry Mackenzie. The novel presents a series of moral vignettes which the naïve protagonist Harley either observes, is told about, or participates in. The novel is often seen to contain elements of the Romantic novel, which became popular in the years following its publication.

== Background ==
The Man of Feeling, Mackenzie's first and most famous novel, was begun in London in 1767. It was published in April 1771, sold out by the beginning of June, and reached its sixth edition by 1791.

Mackenzie wrote The Man of Feeling in the latter half of the eighteenth century, by the end of which the concept of sentimentalism had steadily become merely laughable and entertaining. An 'Index to Tears', which was first included in the 1886 edition of The Man of Feeling edited by Professor Henry Morley, indicates how the "repertory of sentimental effects...has become a repertory of mirthful effects, perhaps to be read aloud in the Victorian parlour to an audience only needing to hear these categories of tears in order to trigger a rather different physical response."

Whilst in the reaction to sentimentalism authors and readers alike satirised or humiliated characters with an excess of emotion, there remained those who supported elements of the genre. According to theorist Hugh Blair, the man of feeling "lives in a different sort of world from what the selfish man inhabits. He possesses a new sense, which enables him to behold objects which the selfish man cannot see".

Mackenzie experienced difficulty in getting The Man of Feeling published, until he finally managed to have it published anonymously. A priest by the name of Eccles made an attempt to claim authorship, supported by "a manuscript full of changes and erasures" in his possession.

== Plot summary ==
The Man of Feeling details the fragmentary episodes of the life of Harley which exist within the remains of a manuscript traded to the initial narrator of the novel by a priest. The novel itself begins with these two latter figures hunting, whereas the manuscript is missing the first ten chapters and approximately thirty others at various locations throughout the manuscript's entirety.

As a young boy, Harley loses his parents and is assigned several guardians who constantly disagree with each other. They do however agree that he should make an effort to acquire more wealth, and so they urge him to make an old distant relative amiable towards him to claim some inheritance. Harley fails in this endeavour, as he doesn't cooperate with the relative's attempts to warm to him.

Harley is then advised to acquire a patron; to sell his vote at an election for a lease of land. His neighbour Mr. Walton gives him a letter of introduction, and he leaves home (and Miss Walton) for London. He meets a beggar and his dog on the way, and after donating to them, hears the fortune-telling beggar's story.

In the following (missing) chapters, Harley formally visits the baronet Mr. Walton recommended him to, because when the narrative continues, Harley is calling on him for the second time. The baronet however is away from London, and Harley meets an unnamed, talkative London sharper. They go for a stroll and then dine together, discussing pensions and resources with two older men.

Harley proceeds to visit Bedlam, and weeps for an inmate there, before dining with a scorned, cynical man and together they discuss honour and vanity. He then demonstrates his skill (or, as many argue, his lack of skill) in physiognomy by being charitable on behalf of an old gentleman, with whom Harley later plays cards. After losing money to them, Harley is informed the gentleman and his acquaintance are con men.

Approached by a prostitute, Harley takes her to a tavern and feeds her, despite having to hand the waiter his pocket watch as collateral for paying the bill, and then meets again with her the next morning to hear her story. At its conclusion her father arrives, and after a misunderstanding is reconciled with his daughter.

Upon discovering that his claim for the land lease has failed, Harley takes a stage-coach back home, discussing poetry and vice with a fellow passenger until they part ways and the coach reaches the end of its route. Harley continues on foot, and along the way meets Edwards, an old farmer from his village who has fallen on hard times and is returning from his conscription in the army. Together they approach the village, to find the school house destroyed, and two orphans who are actually the grandchildren of Harley's companion. Harley takes the three of them home, and provides some land for them.

After discussing corrupt military commanders with Edwards, Harley is informed to his dismay that Miss Walton is going to be married to Sir Harry Benson.

The Man of Feeling then jumps to an unconnected tale of a man named Mountford, who journeys to Milan as tutor to the young Sedley, where they meet with a count. They visit a debtors' prison to find a man and his family living there at the behest of the count's son, a man who had been so charming to the two gentlemen. Sedley pays the family's debt, and then Mountford and Sedley leave Milan in disgust. Jamie is then renowned as the 'Man of Feeling' and is distressed to find that his entry is no longer there.

The narrative returns to the story of Harley. Miss Walton has not married Benson. She visits an unwell Harley (who has contracted a fever nursing Edwards and his grandchildren), who confesses his love to her. They hold hands and he dies.

== Literary style ==
Typical of sentimental fiction, The Man of Feeling is fragmented; chapters and passages are missing, although this is contrived, as the narrative is still comprehensible. Mackenzie highlights these absences, by implying the contents of the non-existent chapters, by chapter numbering (indicating gaps) or through the sudden introduction of characters: "Peter stood at the door. We have mentioned this faithful fellow formerly". The fragmentary nature of the text narrates "the sensibility that is inevitably expressed in moments." It allows for elisions and hiatuses, so that content not evoking the sentimental can be excluded from the text entirely. The transient nature of manuscript itself is further alluded to in the Introduction; the manuscript depicting Harley's life is being used as wadding for the curate's gun. Harley's aunt also employs a book to help fold her linen.
