= Henry Mackenzie =

Scottish lawyer and writer (1745–1831)

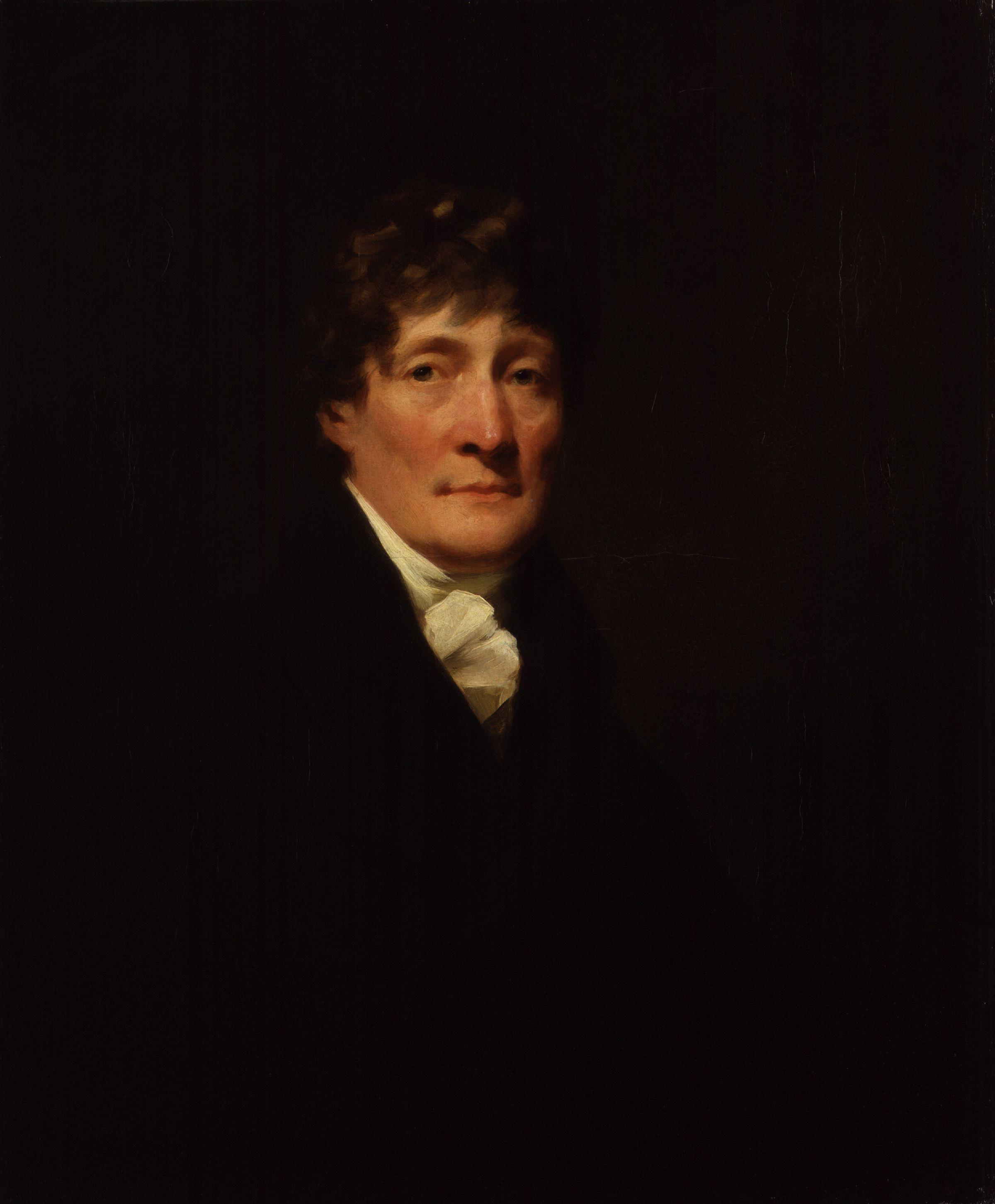
- Portrait of Henry Mackenzie by Henry Raeburn
- Born: 26 July 1745; Edinburgh, Scotland
- Died: 14 January 1831 (aged 85); Edinburgh, Scotland
- Occupation: lawyer

Henry Mackenzie FRSE (August 1745 – 14 January 1831, born and died in Edinburgh) was a Scottish lawyer, novelist and writer sometimes seen as the Addison of the North. While remembered mostly as an author, his main income came from legal roles, which led in 1804–1831 to a lucrative post as Comptroller of Taxes for Scotland, whose possession allowing him to follow his interest in writing. Mackenzie is the author of the novel The Man of Feeling (1771).

== Biography ==
Mackenzie was born at Liberton Wynd in Edinburgh on 26 July 1745. His father, Dr Joshua Mackenzie, was a distinguished Edinburgh physician and his mother, Margaret Rose, belonged to an old Nairnshire family. Mackenzie's own family descended from the ancient Barons of Kintail through the Mackenzies of Inverlael.

Mackenzie was educated at the High School and studied law at University of Edinburgh. He was then articled to George Inglis of Redhall (grandfather of John Alexander Inglis of Redhall), who was attorney for the crown in the management of exchequer business. Inglis had his Edinburgh office on Niddry Wynd, off the Royal Mile, a short distance from Mackenzie's family home.

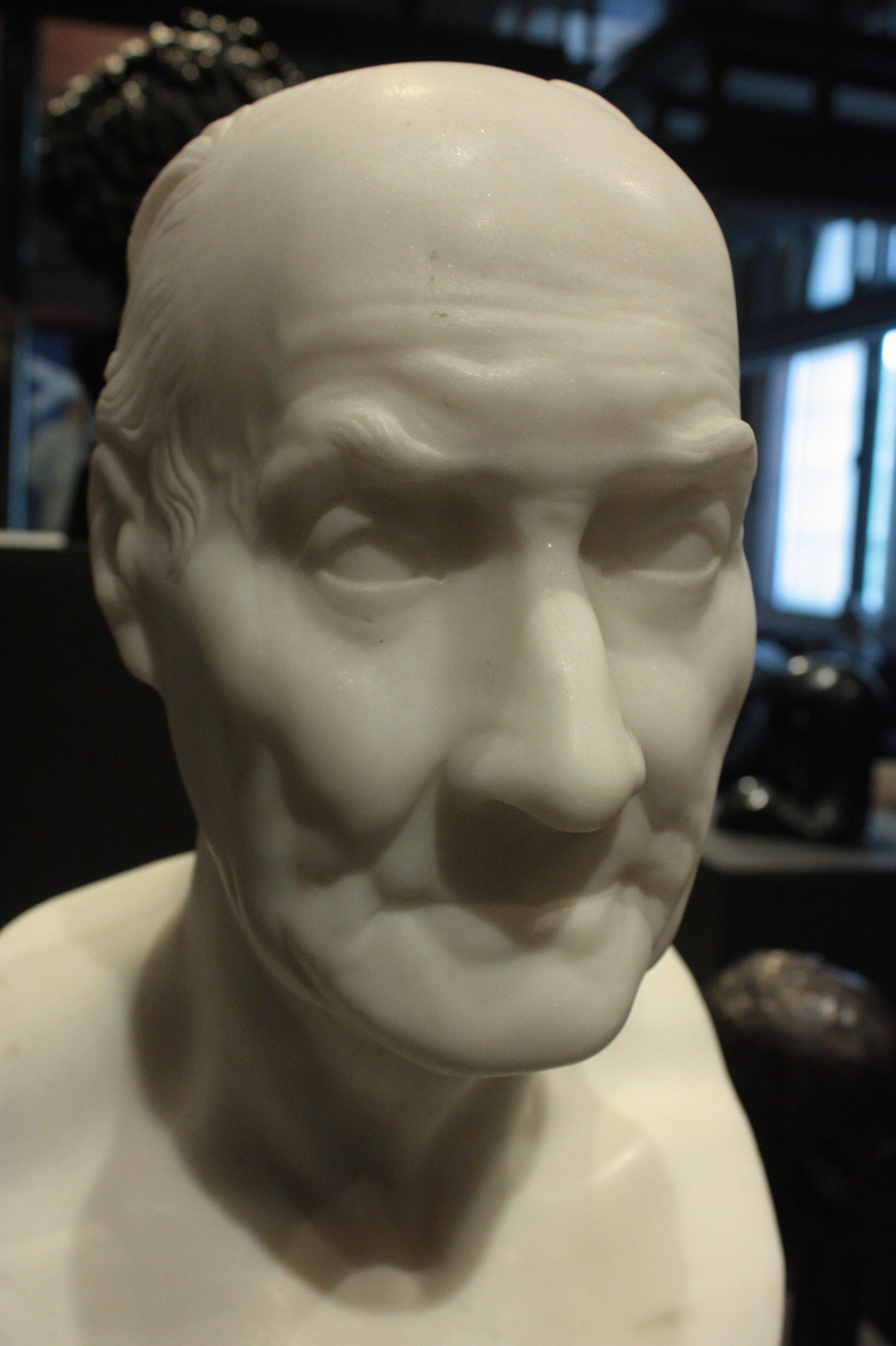
Henry MacKenzie by Samuel Joseph, 1822

In 1765 he was sent to London for his legal studies, and on his return to Edinburgh he set up his own legal office at Cowgatehead off the Grassmarket, apparently as a partner with Inglis (but appearing in directories more as a rival), while he concurrently acted as attorney for the Crown.

Mackenzie had tried for several years to interest publishers in what would become his first and most famous work, The Man of Feeling, but they rejected it. Finally, Mackenzie published it anonymously in 1771, but to instant success. The "Man of Feeling" is a weak creature, dominated by futile benevolence, who goes up to London and falls into the hands of those who exploit his innocence. The sentimental key in the book shows the author's acquaintance with Sterne and Richardson, but in Sir Walter Scott's summary assessment, his work lacked the story construction, humour and character of those writers. Robert Fergusson satirised Mackenzie's perspective on human sentiment in his poem 'The Sow of Feeling', published in The Weekly Magazine on 8th April 1773.

A clergyman from Bath named Eccles claimed authorship of the book, supporting his pretensions with a manuscript full of changes and erasures. Mackenzie's name was then officially announced, but Eccles appears to have convinced some people. In 1773 Mackenzie published a second novel, The Man of the World, whose hero was as consistently bad as the Man of Feeling had been "constantly obedient to every emotion of his moral sense", as Sir Walter Scott put it. Julia de Roubigné (1777) is an epistolary novel.

The first of his dramatic works, The Prince of Tunis, was staged in Edinburgh in 1773 with some success, but others failed. Mackenzie belonged to a literary club in Edinburgh, where papers in the manner of The Spectator were read. This led to the establishment of the weekly Mirror (23 January 1779 – 27 May 1780), of which Mackenzie was editor and chief contributor. It was followed in 1785 by a similar paper, the Lounger, which ran for nearly two years and included one of the earliest tributes to Robert Burns.

In 1783, Mackenzie was a joint founder of the Royal Society of Edinburgh. He became its Literary President in 1812–1828 and Vice President in 1828–1831. At this stage he was listed as an "attorney at the exchequer" living at Browns Square off the Grassmarket.

Mackenzie was an ardent Tory. He wrote many tracts intended to counteract doctrines of the French Revolution, contributing to the Edinburgh Herald under the pseudonym "Brutus". Most remained anonymous, but he acknowledged his Review of the Principal Proceedings of the Parliament of 1784, a defence of the policy of William Pitt written at the desire of Henry Dundas. He was rewarded in 1804 with the office of comptroller of the taxes for Scotland.

In 1776 Mackenzie married Penuel, daughter of Sir Ludovic Grant of Grant. They had eleven children. He was in later years a notable figure in Edinburgh society, nicknamed the Man of Feeling, but in fact a hard-headed man of affairs with a kindly heart. Some of his literary reminiscences appeared in his Account of the Life and Writings of John Home, Esq. (1822). He also wrote a Life of Doctor Blacklock, prefixed to the 1793 edition of the poet's works.

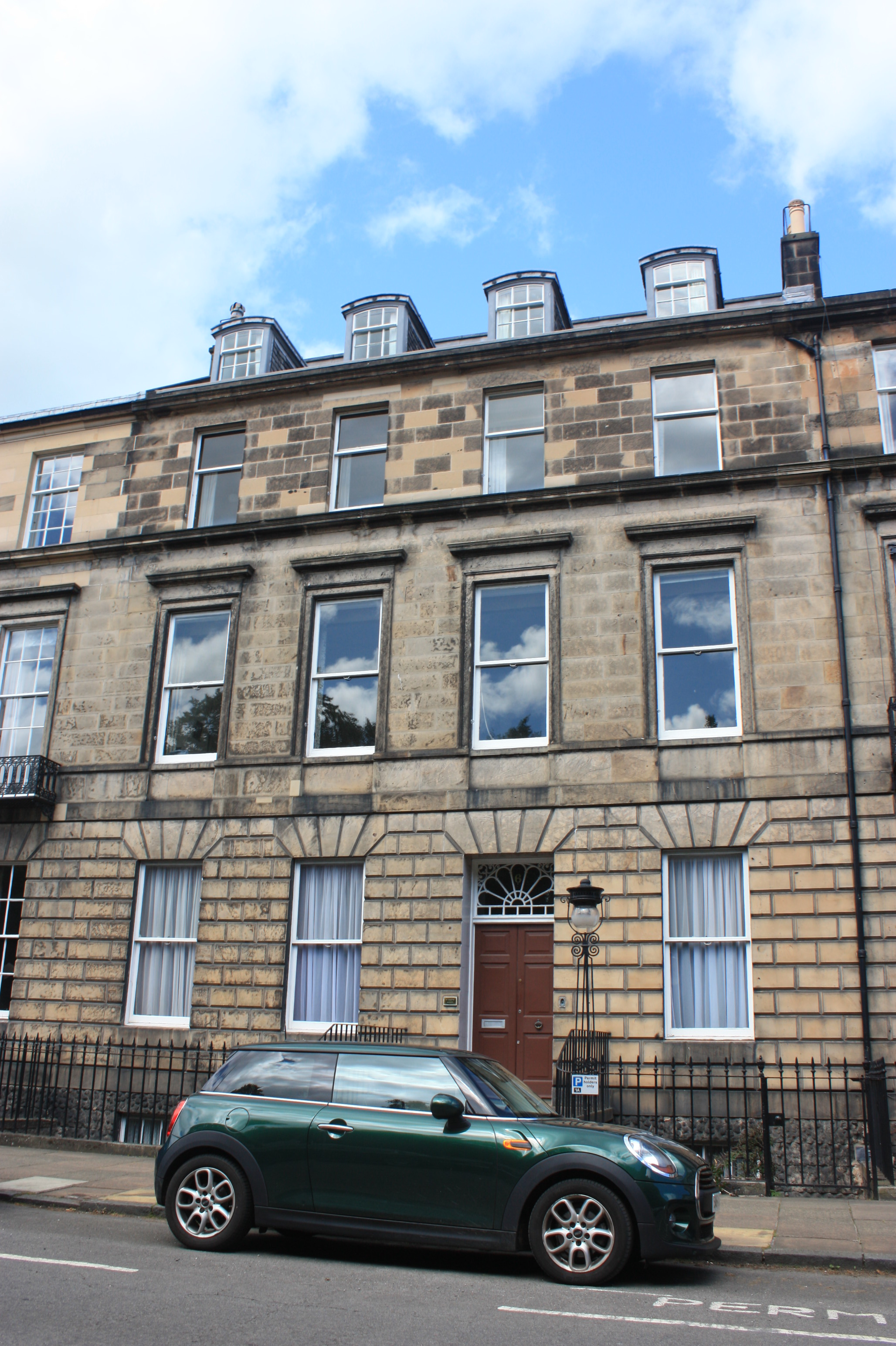
Mackenzie's house at 6 Heriot Row, Edinburgh

In 1805 Mackenzie was living in a townhouse at 55 George Square. In 1806 he moved to the newly completed house at 6 Heriot Row, where he lived as its first occupant until his death. All Heriot Row houses are relatively large but No. 6 has four bays, not three, making it a third larger than its neighbours.

In 1807 The Works of Henry Mackenzie were published surreptitiously, and he then himself superintended the publication of his Works (8 vols., 1808). There is admiring but discriminating criticism of his work in a Prefatory Memoir affixed by Sir Walter Scott to an edition of Mackenzie's novels in Ballantyne's Novelist's Library (vol. v., 1823).

== Family ==
Mackenzie's 1776 marriage to Penuel Grant, daughter of Sir Ludovic Grant, made him an uncle by marriage to Ludovick Grant-Ogilvy, 5th Earl of Seafield. His eldest son, Joshua Henry Mackenzie (1777–1851) was a senator of the College of Justice known as Lord MacKenzie. He is buried with his father in Greyfriars Kirkyard. Two other sons, Robert and William, worked for the East India Company. His son Holt Mackenzie was an EIC administrator and privy councillor.

He had two daughters, Margaret and Hope. His nephew, Joshua Henry Davidson (1785–1847) was First Physician in Scotland to Queen Victoria.

== Death ==
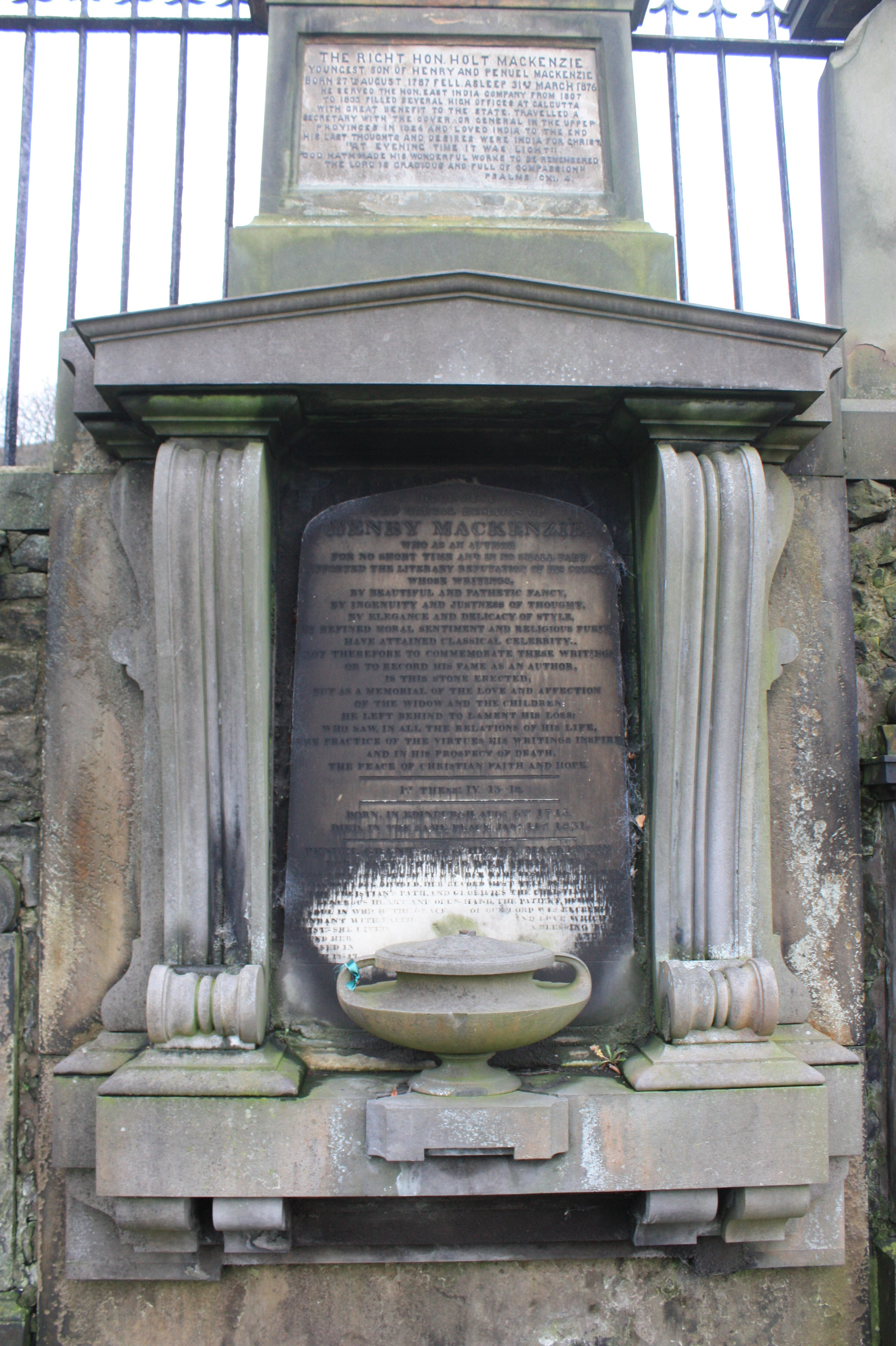
The grave of Henry MacKenzie, Greyfriars Kirkyard

Henry Mackenzie died on 14 January 1831 at his Georgian townhouse at 6 Heriot Row. He is buried in Greyfriars Kirkyard, in a grave facing north in the centre of the north retaining wall.

== Freemasonry ==
MacKenzie was a Scottish Freemason initiated into Lodge Canongate Kilwinning, No. 2, (Edinburgh, Scotland), on 2 December 1784.

== Trivia ==
A small cottage in Colinton is known as "Henry MacKenzie's Cottage". The building was listed based on a "historical connection", but appears absurd, as it never featured among Mackenzie's official addresses. It may therefore have been home to a namesake and so listed under false pretences.

== Works ==
=== Novels ===
- The Man of Feeling (1771)
- The Man of the World (1773)
- Julia de Roubigné (1777)

=== Plays ===
- The Prince of Tunis (a tragedy, 1773)
- The Spanish Father (a tragedy, 1775)
- The White Hypocrite (a comedy, 1789)

=== Non-fiction ===
- Review of the Principal Proceedings of the Parliament of 1784
- Some Account of the Life and Writings of Dr Blacklock (1793)
- Account of the Life of Lord Abercromby (1796)
- An Account of the Life and Writings of William Tytler (1796)
- Account of the Life of Mr John Home Esq. (1812)

=== Periodicals ===
- Editor: The Mirror (1779–1780)
- Editor: The Lounger (1785–1787)
  - Mackenzie's contributions to these two periodicals appear in The Works of Henry Mackenzie, Esq. (1808), Volumes IV–VII.
