= Angela Thomas =

British paediatric haematologist

Angela Thomas OBE FRCPE FRCPath
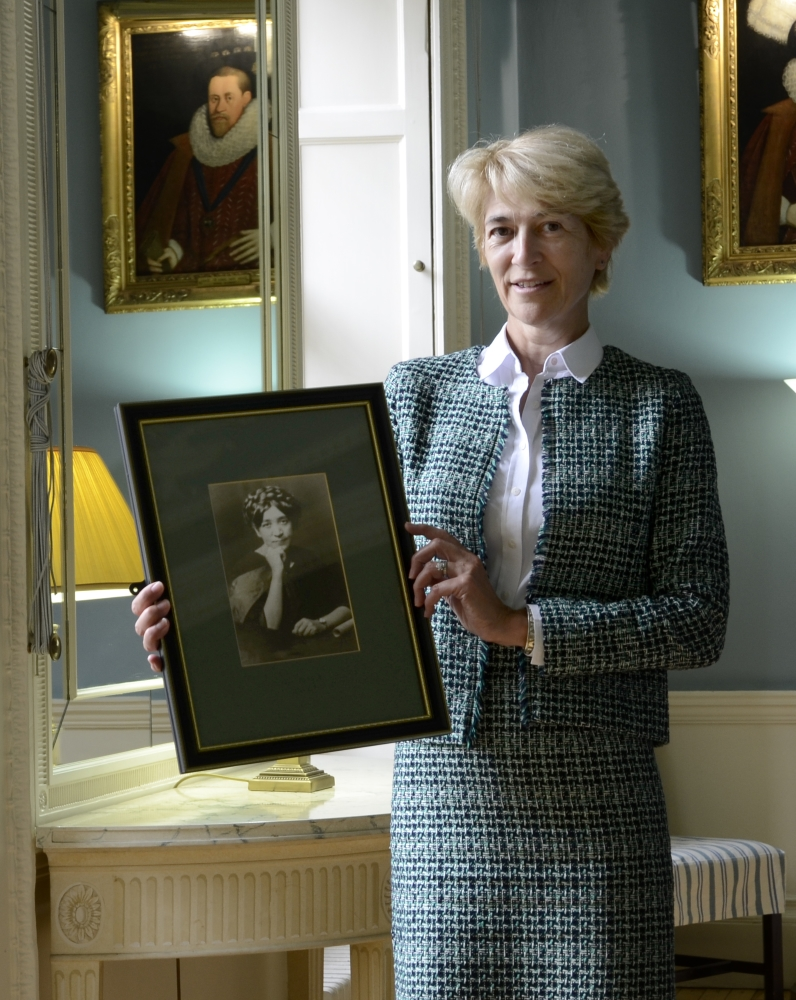
- Thomas with a photograph of Isabella Pringle at the RCPE
- Education: Barts and The London School of Medicine and Dentistry
- Known for: Vice Chair, Commission of Human Medicine (2015 - Present); Director of Heritage, Royal College of Physicians of Edinburgh
- Medical career
- Profession: Physician
- Institutions: Honorary Professor, University of Edinburgh College of Medicine and Veterinary Medicine; President, British Society for Haematology (2012 - 2013)
- Sub-specialties: Paediatrics, haematology

Angela Eleine Thomas is a physician originally specialising in paediatric haematology who has held leading roles during her long career in health and medicine. She is a non-executive director for the Cell and Gene Therapy Catapult. She has had a leading role in the regulation of medicines at National, European and International level and until 2018 was vice chair of the UK government’s Commission on Human Medicines, chairing its Clinical Trials, Biologicals and Vaccines Expert Advisory Group.

== Early life and education ==
Thomas was born in Surbiton, Surrey in June 1957. She initially won a scholarship to attend a local high school then was awarded a junior scholarship for piano at the Royal Academy of Music London between 1969 - 1973. After completing her school years, Thomas attended St Bartholomew's Medical College achieving a Bachelor of Medicine with honors in 1980. She trained in adult haematology, subsequently specialising in paediatric haematology. In 1996 Thomas was awarded a PhD From University College London, for her research into fibrinogen.

== Career ==
Thomas worked in the NHS as a haematologist for nearly 40 years where she specialised in the care of children with congenital and acquired bleeding disorders, including leukemia and immune deficiency. Between 1993 and 2017 she was a consultant haematologist for the Royal Hospital for Sick Children, Edinburgh. She became head of the haematology laboratory at RHSC from Jan 1993 until March 2000. Then was the lead clinician for the integrated haematology/biochemistry laboratory in April 2000. From 2011 until 2017 she was Director of the Edinburgh Haemophilia Comprehensive Care Centre.

She is on the National Emergency Stockpile Quality Panel.

She is vice-chair of the Commission on Human Medicines and chairs the Clinical Trials, Biologicals & Vaccines Expert Advisory Group.

She is a Scientific Committee Member and expert with the European Medicines Agency. She was awarded an OBE for services to the regulation of public health in the 2018 New Years Honours.

She was acting President of the Royal College of Physicians of Edinburgh (RCPE) from June 2020 through June 2021.

=== Awards and honours ===
In 2018, Thomas was awarded an OBE for her services to the Regulation of Medicines for the protection and promotion of Public Health.

Academic offices
Preceded by Andrew Elder	President of the Royal College of Physicians of Edinburgh; 2020 - 2021	Succeeded by Andrew Elder
