= James Petrie =

Scottish medical doctor (1941–2001)

Professor James Petrie CBE FRSE FRCP FRCPE FRCGP FRCPI FFPM FMedSci
- Born: James Colquhoun Petrie; 18 September 1941
- Died: 31 August 2001 (aged 59)
- Occupation: Medical doctor
- Employer: University of Aberdeen

James Colquhoun Petrie (18 September 1941 – 31 August 2001) was a Scottish medical doctor, Professor of Clinical Pharmacology, from 1985, and Head of the Department of Medicine and Therapeutics, from 1994 at the University of Aberdeen.

He studied medicine at Aberdeen University.

A keen skier, in 1976 he founded the Lecht Ski Company. In 1986 he founded the Health Services Research Unit.

In 1996 he was created a Commander of the Order of the British Empire for his services to medicine.

He was president of the Royal College of Physicians of Edinburgh from 1997 to 2001.

In 2000 he was elected a Fellow of the Royal Society of Edinburgh. His proposers were Charles D. Forbes, Gordon Whitby, Graeme Catto and Laurie Prescott.

He died of glioblastoma on 21 August 2001.

Academic offices
Preceded by John D Cash	President of the Royal College of Physicians of Edinburgh; 1997–2001	Succeeded by Niall Finlayson

== Publications ==
- Clinical Effects of Interaction Between Drugs (1975)
- Diagnostic Picture Tests in Clinical Medicine (1984) co-author
- Blood Pressure Measurement (1997)

== Family ==
In 1964 he married fellow medical student Xanthe and they had four children.
