= John Scott (physician, died 1859) =

Scottish naval surgeon and physician (1797–1859)

John Scott FRSE FRCPE FRCP (26 January 1797–19 January 1859) was a 19th-century Scottish naval surgeon and physician to Queen Victoria in Scotland.

== Life ==
He was born on 26 January 1797 the youngest son of Rev James Scott of Benholm in Kincardineshire.

He studied at Marischal College in Aberdeen graduating with an MA in 1814. He then served an apprenticeship with two separate surgeons in Brechin. Returning for formal medical training he went to London and then the University of Edinburgh.

He joined the East India Company in 1818 as a Surgeon's Mate. He gained his doctorate (MD) in 1820, and was promoted to full Surgeon, making further journeys to the East Indies in 1821 and 1823.

In 1824 he settled in Barnes in Middlesex and became successful there.

In 1832 Scott was elected a member of the Harveian Society of Edinburgh and served as President in 1847.

By 1845 he is listed as "Physician to the Queen" (Queen Victoria) and living at 43 Queen Street in Edinburgh's New Town. In this year he was elected a Fellow of the Royal College of Physicians of Edinburgh and also became the official medical examiner for the East India Company. In 1850 he was elected a Fellow of the Royal Society of Edinburgh his proposer being Henry Marshall.

In 1850 he is living at 4 Rutland Street in Edinburgh's West End. He moved back to London around 1851 and had a successful practice in the West End.

In 1854 he began corresponding with Sir George Ballingall. In 1858 he was elected a Fellow of the Royal College of Physicians in London.

He died on 19 January 1859, and is buried in Dean Cemetery in Edinburgh.
