= Joshua Henry Davidson =

Scottish physician

Joshua Henry Davidson FRSE
- Born: 1785; Edinburgh, Scotland
- Died: 5 January 1847 (aged 61–62); Edinburgh
- Other name: Dr J Henry Davidson
- Citizenship: Scottish
- Education: University of Edinburgh
- Occupation: Scottish physician
- Known for: First Physician to Queen Victoria when in Scotland.

Joshua Henry Davidson FRSE PRCPE (1785–5 January 1847) was a Scottish physician who was twice President of the Royal College of Physicians of Edinburgh and also First Physician to Queen Victoria when in Scotland.

== Life ==
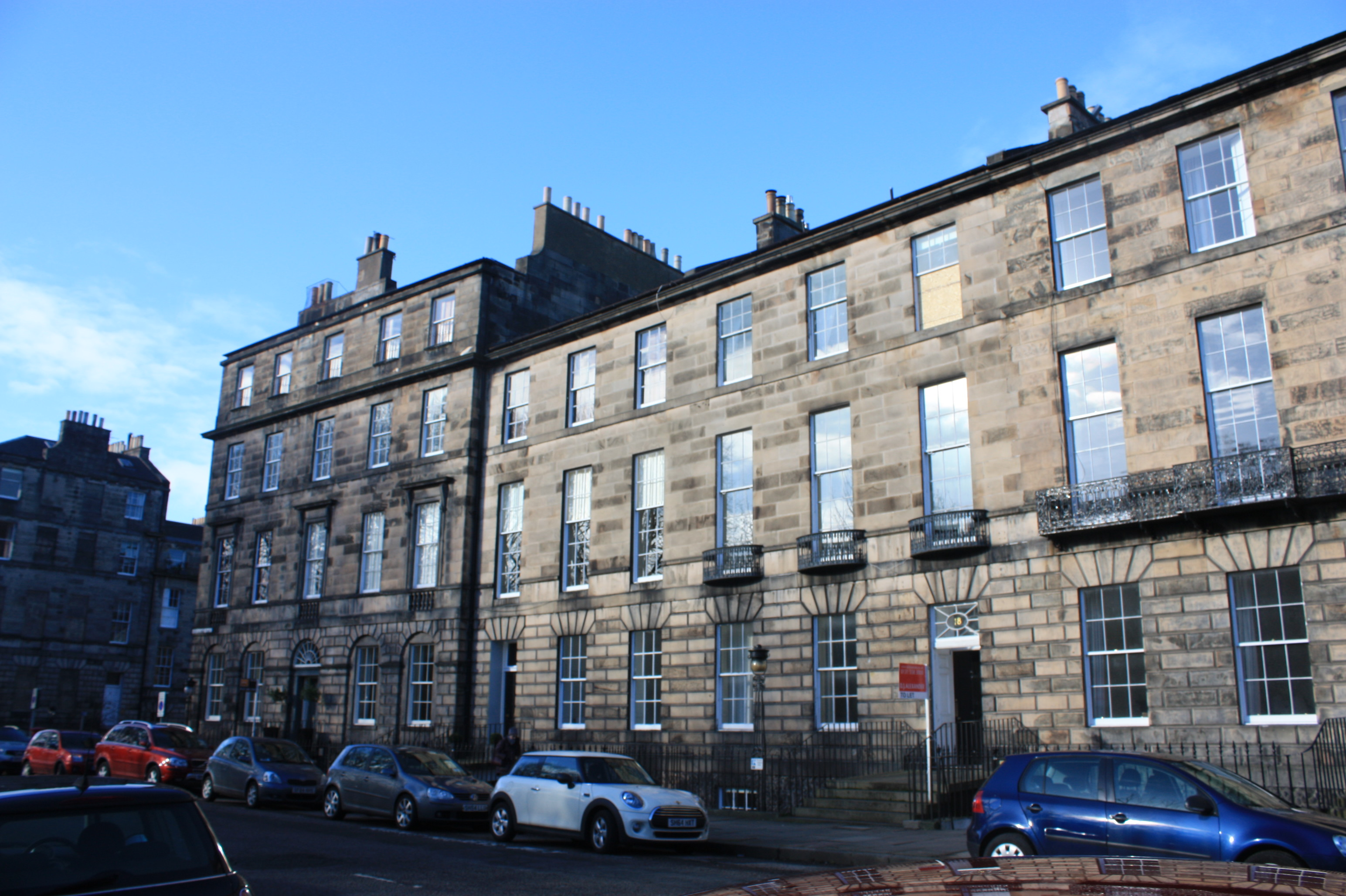
19 Abercromby Place, Edinburgh

He was born around 1785 in Edinburgh, the son of Hannah, sister to Henry Mackenzie, and John Davidson of Ravelrig, landowner south-west of Edinburgh. He attended Edinburgh High School 1793-8.

He studied medicine at the University of Edinburgh, and graduated with an MD on 24 June 1807. He worked partly from the New Town Dispensary.

He was elected a Fellow of the Royal Society of Edinburgh in 1813. His proposers were Henry Mackenzie (his uncle), Thomas Charles Hope and John Playfair. He served as President of the Royal College of Physicians of Edinburgh twice: from 1829 to 1831 and 1833 to 1834. He was also a member of the Medico-Chirurgical Society of Edinburgh and the Highland Society.

He died at home, 19 Abercromby Place in Edinburgh’s New Town on 5 January 1847.

== Artistic recognition ==
His father had been the subject of a portrait by David Martin.

A bust of Joshua Henry Davidson by Peter Slater is held in Royal College of Physicians of Edinburgh.

== Family ==
His daughter, Margaret Davidson (died 1904), married James Medlicott of Kildare (1828–1913) who at 84 was the oldest still-serving magistrate in Kildare.
