= Norman Purvis Walker =

Sir Norman Purvis Walker
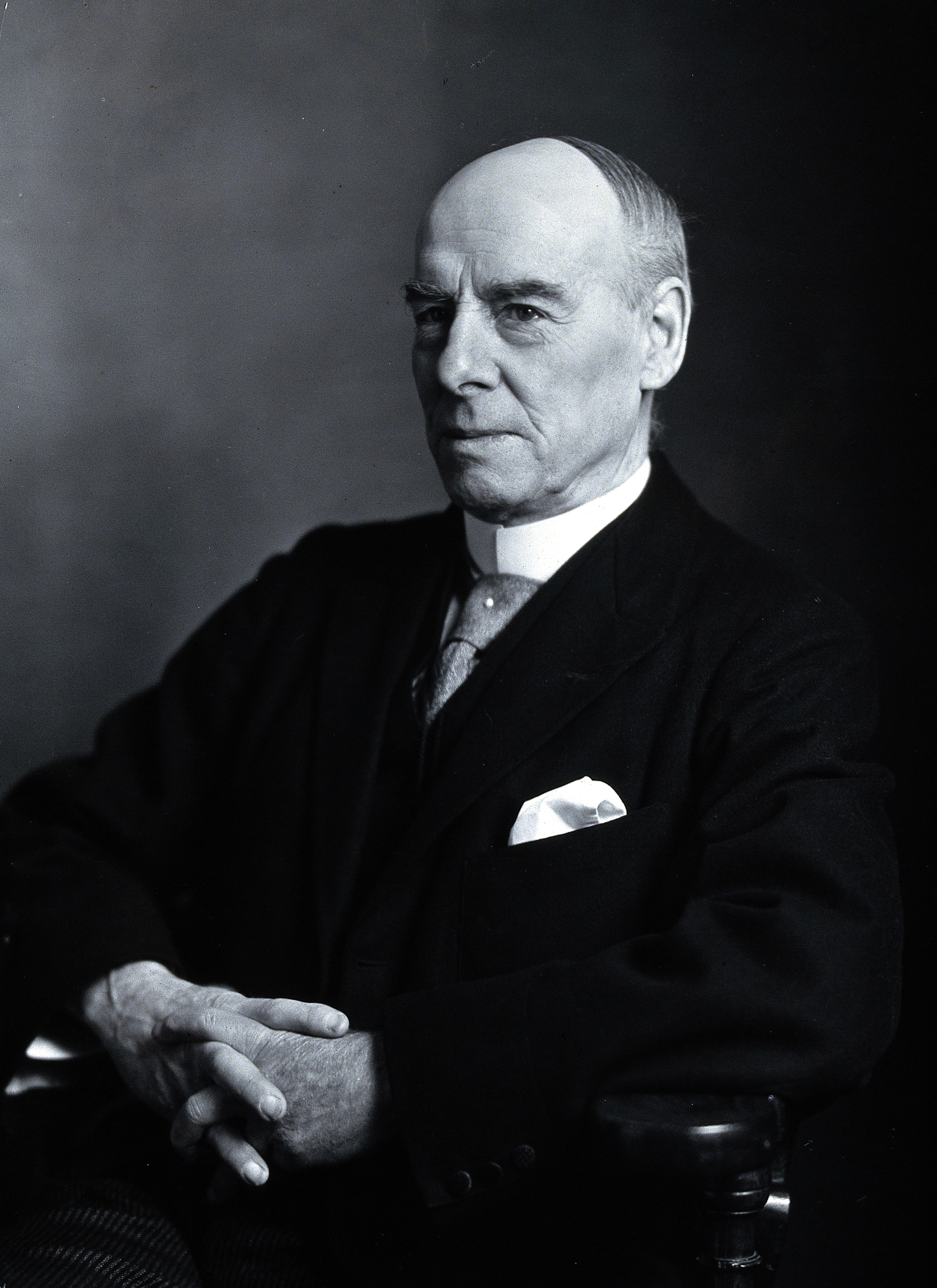
- Sir Norman Walker
- Born: 2 August 1862; Dysart, Fife
- Died: 7 November 1942 (aged 80); Balerno, Scotland
- Education: University of Edinburgh
- Occupation: dermatologist

Sir Norman Purvis Walker FRCPE (2 August 1862, Dysart – 7 November 1942, Balerno) was a Scottish dermatologist, and physician-in-charge of the Skin Department at the Royal Infirmary of Edinburgh. He was also one of the first persons in Britain to benefit from the discovery of insulin as a treatment for diabetes.

== Education and early career ==
He was born in the manse at Dysart (close to Kirkcaldy) the son of the local minister, Rev Walker.

Norman Walker was educated at Edinburgh Academy, and graduated from the University of Edinburgh with an MB CM in 1884, and an MD in 1888. In 1888, he produced a thesis entitled ‘Pleurisy: with clinical notes and remarks’.

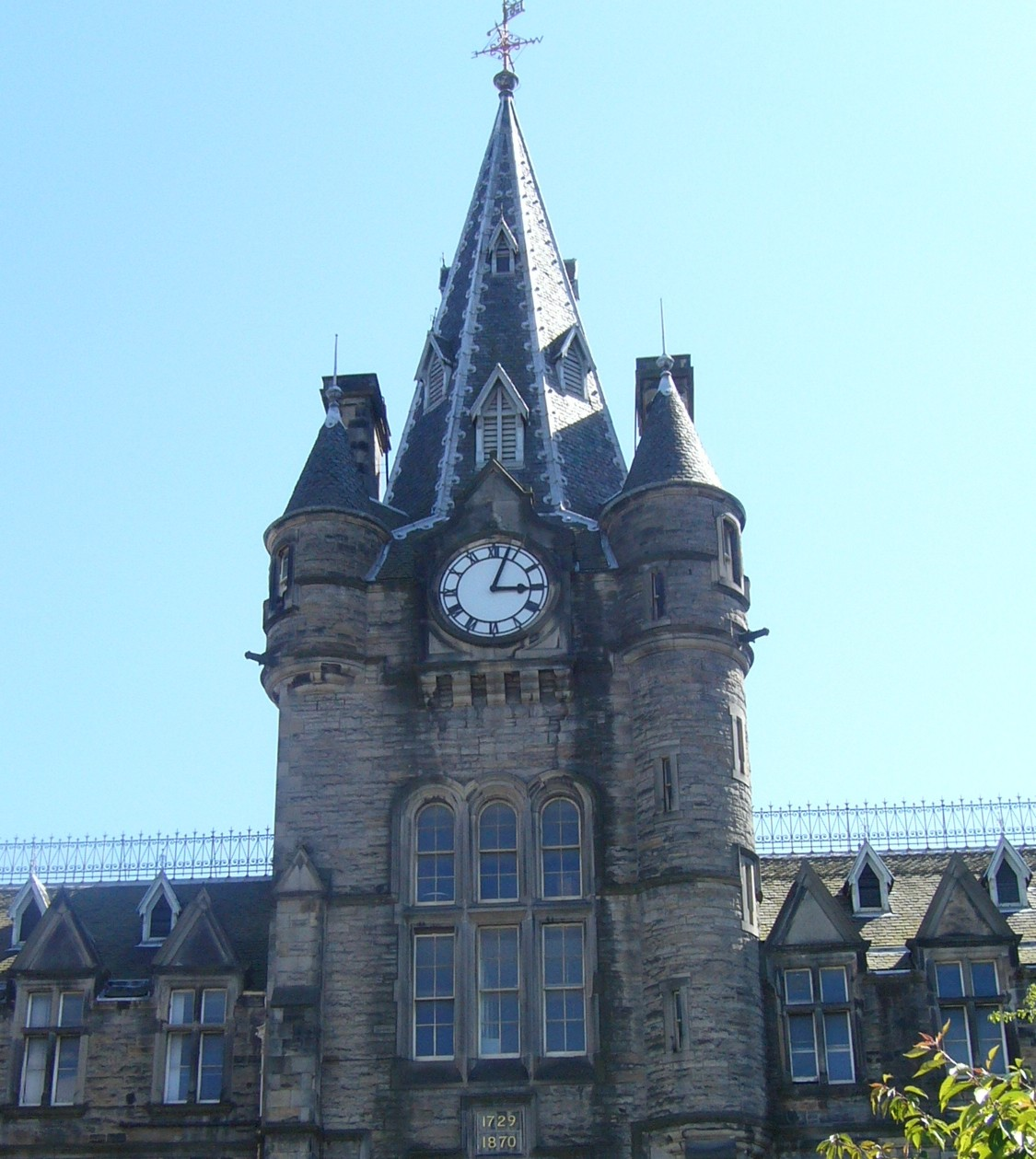
The Royal Infirmary of Edinburgh, where Norman Walker worked for most of his career.

In 1883, Walker started in his first post, as resident physician to Claude Muirhead at the Royal Infirmary of Edinburgh, and for the next five years he was in general practice in Dalston, Cumberland.

Having decided to study dermatology, he went to Europe to specialise and learn from pioneers of the field. His first stop was in Vienna, where Hans von Hebra and Moriz Kohn Kaposi continued the elder Hebra's tradition; in Prague Walker devoted much of his time to the study of histopathology and bacteriology in the laboratory of Professor Philipp Josef Pick; and in Hamburg he became a student of Paul Gerson Unna, one of the pioneers in dermapathology.

== Professional and academic career ==
Norman Walker returned to Edinburgh around 1892, living at 7 Manor Place, and was then appointed assistant physician to the skin department of the Royal Infirmary of Edinburgh under Allan Jamieson, until 1906. When the latter retired, Walker became physician in charge of the skin wards from 1906 to 1924, and consultant physician from 1925 to 1942. Additionally, Walker gave lectures on diseases of the skin at the University of Edinburgh and at the royal colleges, and had a private practice as well as a special clinic to treat lupus vulgaris, which he continued after he retired.

Walker was involved in a number of academic and medical organisations, making an impact on medical services in Scotland and in the world. He was elected fellow of the Royal College of Physicians of Edinburgh in 1892, and was treasurer from 1908 to 1929, and president from 1929 to 1931. In 1895 he was elected a member of the Harveian Society of Edinburgh. He was also directly elected representative of Scottish practitioners on the General Medical Council from 1906 to 1941 (President from 1931 to 1939). In the late 1920s, he produced a report on the recognition of Indian qualifications contributed to improving medical education in India. He was knighted (India Office list) in 1923. He was resident of the British Association of Dermatologists for 1921–22.

His other distinctions included honorary fellowship of the American Medical Association and honorary membership of the Association of Military Surgeons of the United States, as well as honorary degrees of LLD at St Andrews (1920), Edinburgh (1926), and Bristol (1933), and MD Dublin (1935).

== Translations and publications ==
Norman Walker translated G. H. A. Hansen and C. Looft's German text as Leprosy in its Clinical and Pathological Aspects (1895), and Paul Gerson Unna’s Histopathologie der Hautkrankheiten as The Histopathology of Diseases of the Skin (1896). In 1899, Walker published Introduction to Dermatology based on his lectures to undergraduates. The tenth edition appeared in 1939 with Walker and George Hector Percival as authors. For some time Walker was editor of the Scottish Medical and Surgical Journal, and joint editor of the Edinburgh Medical Journal after the two journals merged.

== Personal life ==
Norman Walker was born on 2 August 1862 at the Free Church Manse in Dysart, Fife, to Revd Dr Norman Macdonald Lockhart Walker and Christian Alexander Normand. He married Annie (b. 1864/65), only daughter of Edward Trimble, on 24 August 1887. They had three sons and one daughter.

Shortly after the war, Walker was found to be suffering of diabetes. His health deteriorated quickly, and by 1922 his colleagues feared for his life. However the discoverers of insulin heard of his condition, and sent him some batches before the product was available on the market. Walker completely recovered in a few weeks, and thus was one of the first person to benefit from insulin in the UK.

Sir Norman Walker died at home in Greensyke, Balerno, Midlothian, on 7 November 1942. He was survived by his wife and children.
