= Charles Stuart of Dunearn =

Co-founder of the Royal Society of Edinburgh

Charles Stuart of Dunearn FRSE (1745–1826) was a Scottish minister who went on to co-found the Royal Society of Edinburgh and to be President of the Royal College of Physicians of Edinburgh.

== Life ==
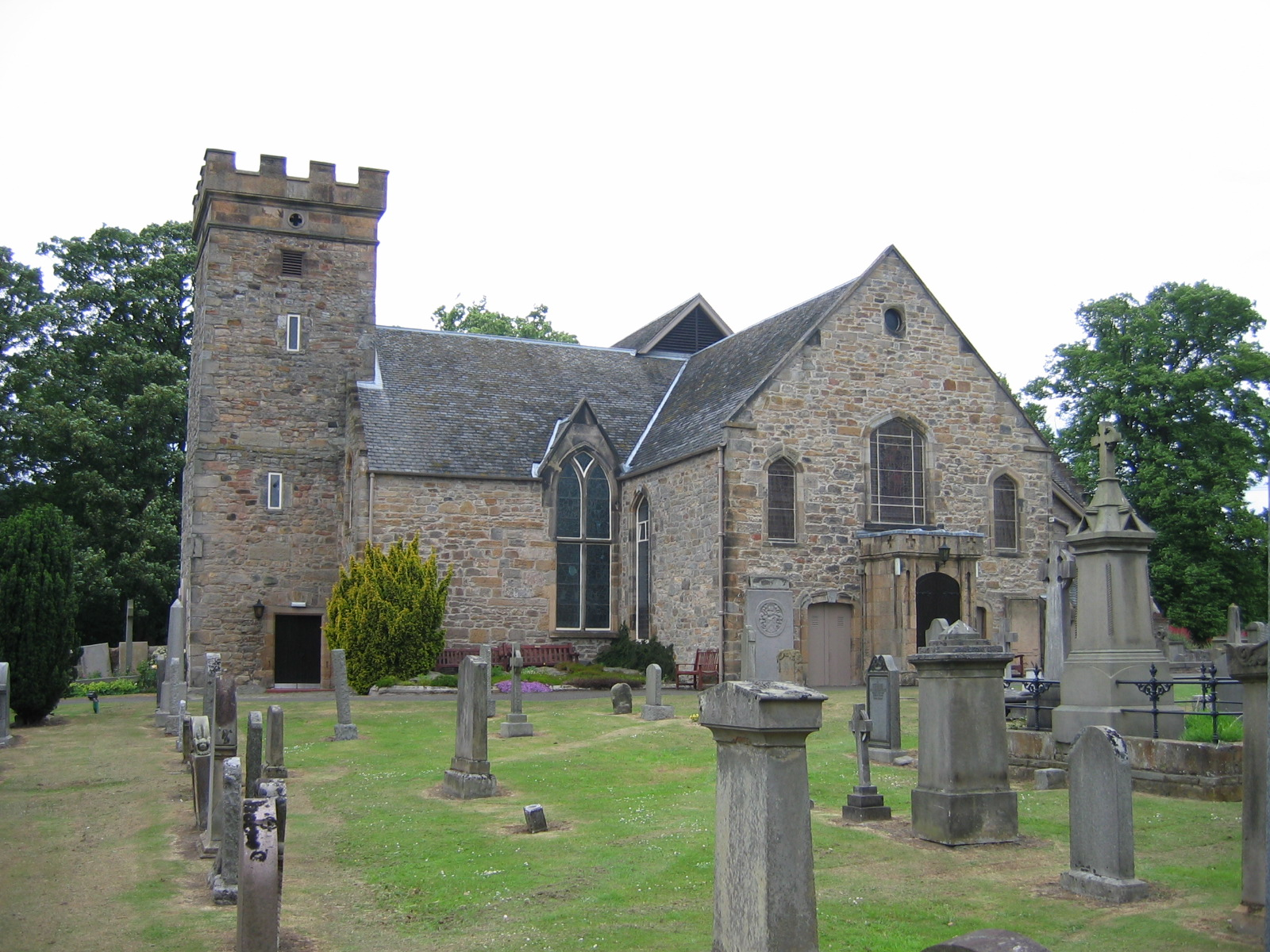
Cramond Kirk

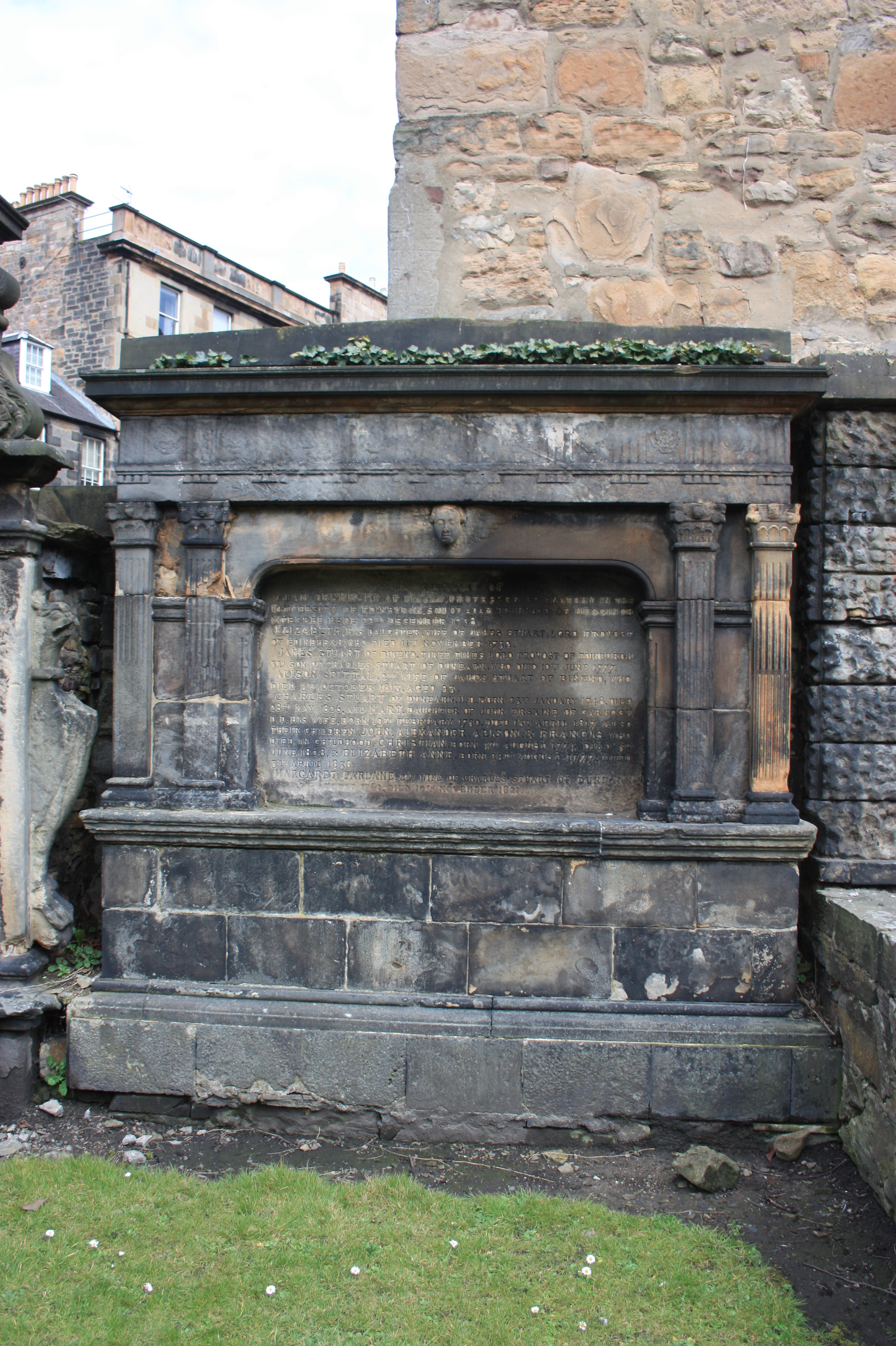
The Stuart tomb in Greyfriars Kirkyard

He was born at Dunearn House near Burntisland in Fife in 1745 the son of James Stuart of Binend, later Lord Provost of Edinburgh, and his first wife, Elizabeth Drummond, daughter of Dr Adam Drummond.

He originally trained as a minister and was licensed by the Church of Scotland in London in August 1772. He was ordained in Cramond Kirk on 30 September the following year under the patronage of Lady Glenorchy. He resigned and left Cramond in May 1776, creating in 1781 an independent Anabaptist church in Edinburgh, which was somewhat short-lived.

In 1777 he inherited his father's estates of Dunearn and Binend in Fife.

He retrained as a doctor, studying medicine at the University of Edinburgh. He was President of the Royal Medical Society (a student organisation) in 1780 gaining his doctorate (MD) in 1781. He lived and practised from 18 Nicolson Street in Edinburgh's South Side. During his period (in 1783) he was one of the joint founders of the Royal Society of Edinburgh.

From 1798 to 1800 he was editor of the Edinburgh Quarterly Review. He was also Governor of the Edinburgh Orphan Hospital at Shakespeare Square at the east end of Princes Street.

Flourishing and popular as a physician he was elected President of the Royal College of Physicians of Edinburgh in 1806 in succession to Dr Thomas Spens.

He died at home 41 George Square, Edinburgh on 28 May 1826. He is buried with his parents in Greyfriars Kirkyard. The distinctive tomb lies against the eastern boundary wall.

== Publications ==
He published under the pen-name of "Philalethes".

- The Present State of Hitman Nature (1773)
- The Distinction between the Kingdom of Christ and Kingdom of this World (1777)

He was editor of the Edinburgh Quarterly Magazine from 1798 to 1800.

== Family ==
In 1773 he married Mary Erskine, daughter of Rev John Erskine, minister of Greyfriars Kirk. They had at least eight children. Their most notable child was the notorious politician, James Stuart (1775-1849). Their daughter Jean Stuart was the second wife of Thomas Hogg. His daughter, named Alison Charles, married John Wilson Carmichael. She lived in St Vincent and Trinidad in the 1820s. Based on her experiences in the Caribbean, she wrote the proslavery text Domestic Manners and Social Condition of the White, Coloured, and Negro Population of the West Indies (1833).

His wife Mary died in 1817 and he then married Margaret Parlane, daughter of Alexander Parlane a surgeon in Glasgow. She died in 1821. They had no further children.
