= William Thomas Ritchie =

Scottish cardiologist (1873–1945)

William Thomas Ritchie

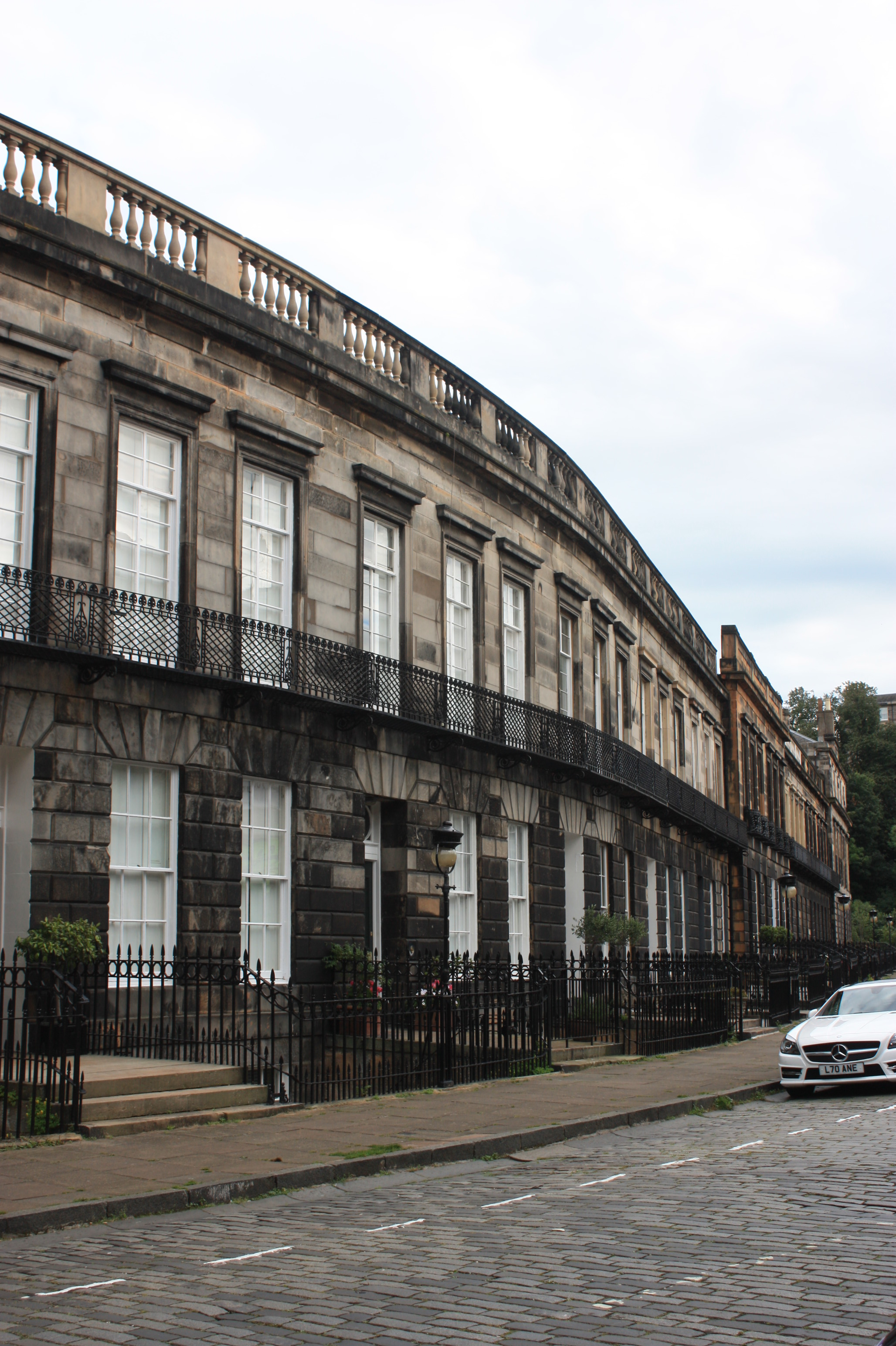
Danube Street, Edinburgh

Professor William Thomas Ritchie FRSE PRCPE LLD OBE (3 November 1873 – 7 February 1945) was a Scottish cardiologist who served as President of the Royal College of Physicians of Edinburgh from 1935 to 1937.

== Life ==
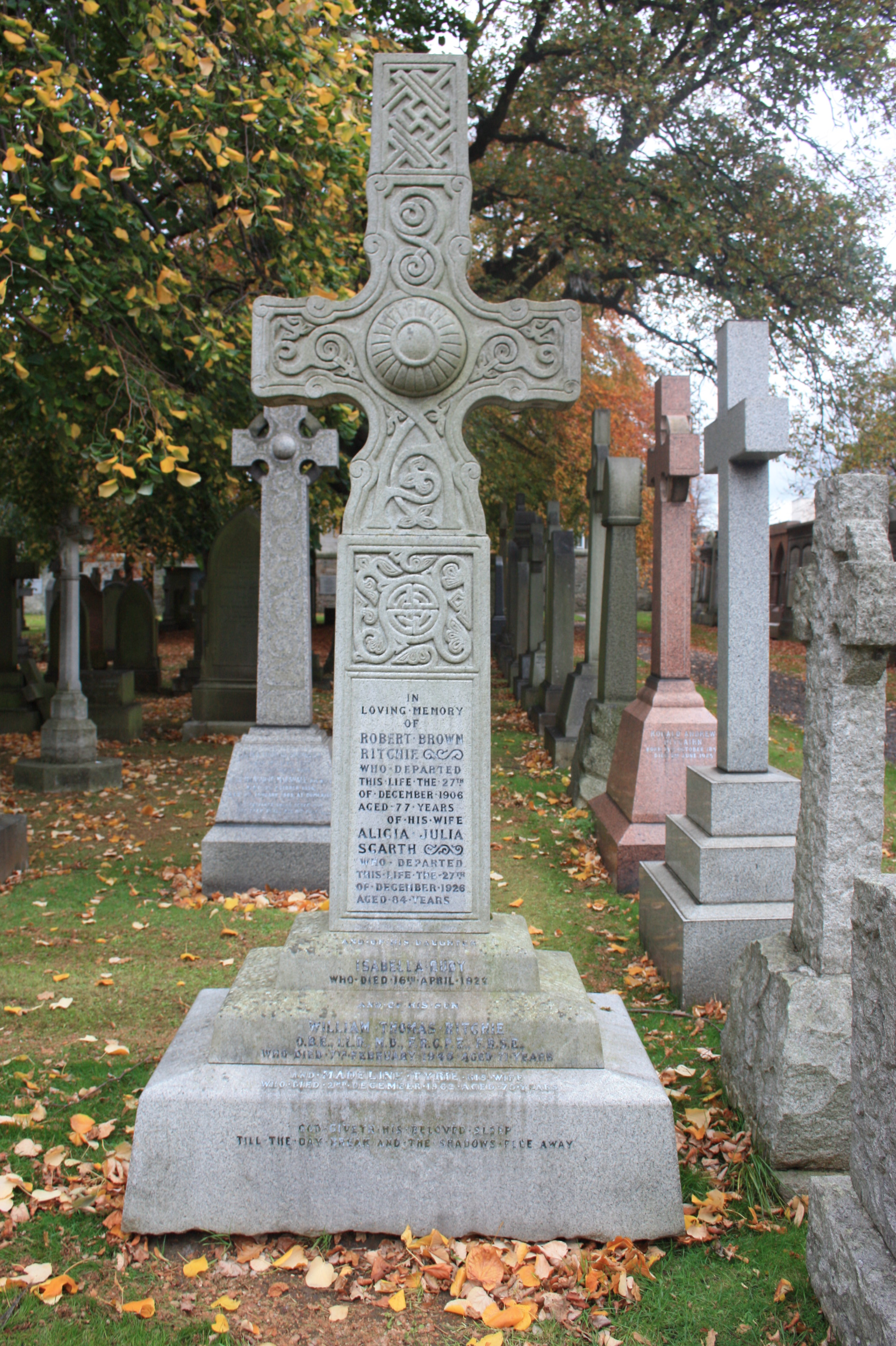
The grave of William Thomas Ritchie, Dean Cemetery, Edinburgh

He was born on 3 November 1873 in Edinburgh, the son of Robert Brown Ritchie (1829-1906) and his wife Alicia Julia Scarth. The family lived at 13 Danube Street in the Stockbridge district. He was educated at Edinburgh Academy 1884 to 1890 then studied medicine at the University of Edinburgh graduating MB ChB in 1896. He did further postgraduate study in Vienna. He gained his MD in 1899.

He had a 40-year career in Edinburgh mainly at the Edinburgh Royal Infirmary and Deaconess Hospital.

In 1904 he was elected a member of the Harveian Society of Edinburgh. In 1905 he was elected a Fellow of the Royal Society of Edinburgh. His proposers were George Alexander Gibson, Diarmid Noel Paton, Daniel John Cunningham and Edward Albert Sharpey-Schafer.

In the First World War, he served as Medical Officer attached to the 1/3rd Scottish Horse and then oversaw the 27th General Hospital in Egypt. He was awarded an OBE for his war services and attached to Bangour Hospital for post-war services.

In 1923 he gave the Gibson Memorial Lecture. In 1928 he succeeded Professor Lovell Gulland as Professor of Clinical Medicine at the University of Edinburgh. In 1928 he was also elected a member of the Aesculapian Club.

He died at his home on Barnshot Road in Colinton on 7 February 1945.

== Family ==
In 1921 he was married to Madeline Tyrie (1887-1962).

== Publications ==
- Diseases of the Heart (with Dr John Cowan)
- Medical Diagnosis (with J J Graham Brown)
