= Clan Spens =

Lowland Scottish clan

- Crest: A hart's head erased proper.
- Motto: SI DEUS QUIS CONTRA (from Latin: If God is for us, who is against us").

Profile
- Region: Fife.

Chief
- Patrick Nathaniel George Spens.
- The 4th Baron Spens.

Clan Spens or Spence is a Lowland Scottish clan and is also a sept of Clan MacDuff.

== History ==
=== Origins of the Name ===
The name Spens or Spence means "custodian" or "dispenser", possibly derived from Old French.

=== Origins of the Clan ===
The principal Scottish family of Clan Spens descend from one of the ancient Earls of Fife. John 'Dispensator' or 'Le Dispenser' appeared in a list of the tenants and vassals of Walter fitz Alan Steward of Scotland on the period 1161–1171. Roger 'Dispensator' witnessed a charter by Bricius de Douglas, the bishop of Moray granting the church of Deveth to Spynie between 1202 and 1222 . His son Thomas 'Dispensator' witnessed a charter in 1232 of Andreas de Moravia, later bishop of Moray. John Spens is listed as baillie of Irvine in 1260. In the year 1296 Henry de Spens, feudal baron, swore fealty to Edward I of England, and his name appears on the Ragman Rolls of 1296. He died around 1300, when his son, Thomas, succeeded. He is mentioned in two charters of King Robert the Bruce. His heir Thomas de Spens witnessed several charters of Trinity college of Edinburgh between 1296 and 1324 and of the monastery of Soltray. One of his sons William de Spens was laird of Gylgyrstoun, Glespany and gets the lands of Dumbarnie and Bondiingtoune from William Douglas, 1st Earl of Douglas in 1358. His son William de Spens get married with Isabel Campbell of Glendouglas heiress and daughter of Sir Duncan Campbell of Glen Douglas and Strachur. They get by charter given in Dunblane the 5 May 1385 the lands of Athaland, Ketydy and Craigswmqwar from Robert Earl of Fife and Menteith. These lands were later made into a barony in 1430.

=== 15th century ===
By the early 15th century, the family had risen to considerable prominence, which entitled John Spens of Lathallan to sit in the Parliament called by King James I of Scotland at Perth in 1434. John married Isabel, daughter of Sir John Wemyss of Clan Wemyss, and had three sons. Patrick, the youngest, was officer of the 24 bodyguards sent by King James II of Scotland to King Charles VII of France in 1450. He settled in France and his descendants were the prominent family of Baron de Spens d'Estignols in the French nobility. The "Garde Écossaise", as they were later known, were to become the first company of the Garde du Corps du Roi - the personal bodyguard of the French kings until the revolution of 1789. Charles VIII of France takes in the honour of "his beloved" Patrick baron de Spens the motto of the Spens'family :"Si Deus [pro nobis] quis contra [nos] ?". The French barons de Spens d'Estignols are the actual chief of name and arms of the Spens. All the Spens of Scotland and England comes from the marriage of John Spens laird of a quarter of lathallan and his wife Isabel Barde. This John Spens was one of the sons of William Spens, cadet son of William Spens and Isabel Campbell.

Thomas Spens, the second son, entered the Church and rose to high office. He was appointed Bishop of Galloway and later Lord Privy Seal, a post he held until 1470. He was translated to the bishopric of Aberdeen in 1459, and being considered a clever and shrewd negotiator, he was regularly employed on state business. In 1449 he was sent to conclude a marriage contract between the heir to the Duke of Savoy and Arabella, sister of James II. Two years later he was sent as ambassador to negotiate a truce with England. He died in Edinburgh in 1480 and was buried at the Trinity College churchyard at the foot of Leith Wynd. There is an effigy of Bishop Spens in the splendid chapel of Roslin.

=== 16th century and Mary, Queen of Scots ===
During the reign of Mary, Queen of Scots, the loyalties of the family were divided. Sir John Spence of Condie was Lord Advocate, but adhered to the reformed Church. When commanded by the queen to prosecute the reformer John Knox, for alleged treason, he did so with no great zeal, and Knox was acquitted. David Spens of Wormieston, however, was a loyal subject of Mary, and was denounced as a rebel by the Parliament summoned by Regent Lennox in August 1571. David was one of the ringleaders of the attempt to seize Lennox at Stirling in September of that year, and he was given the task of taking the regent personally to hold as hostage. According to one narrative, Spens followed his orders to keep Lennox secure so literally that when some of the conspirators decided to kill the regent, Spens stopped a pistol shot by throwing himself in front of his prisoner. When supporters of Lennox came to his rescue, they killed Spens on the spot, despite the regent's attempts to save his unlikely saviour. However, the family were later reconciled to King James VI of Scotland, who sent Sir James Spens of Wormieston as ambassador to Sweden, where a branch of the family settled, rising high in the Swedish nobility as Counts Spens.

=== 18th to 20th centuries ===
Dr. Nathaniel Spens (1728–1815), second son of the 15th Laird of Lathallan, bought back Craigsanquhar, Fife (which belonged to the family from 1385 to 1524) in 1792. His descendant, Sir Patrick Spens (1885–1973), was created 1st Lord Spens of Blairsanquhar, Fife, in 1959.

Dr. Nathaniel Spens of Craigsanquhar in Fife was also the president of the Royal College of Physicians in 1794. He was a prominent member of the Royal Company of Archers (the monarch's bodyguard in Scotland) and a famous portrait of him hangs in Archers' Hall in Edinburgh. One of his descendants, Sir William Spens, was vice-chancellor of Cambridge University from 1931 to 1933. Another kinsman, John Spens, WS, was Albany Herald to the Court of the Lord Lyon, King of Arms.

== Clan Chief ==
The Rt Hon The Lord Spens, Patrick Nathaniel George Spens, The 4th Baron Spens, Chief of the Name and Arms of Spens in the United Kingdom. The heir apparent is the present holder's son The Hon. Peter Lathallan Spens (b. 2000).
