= Harveian Society of Edinburgh =

Medical society in Edinburgh, Scotland

The Harveian Society of Edinburgh
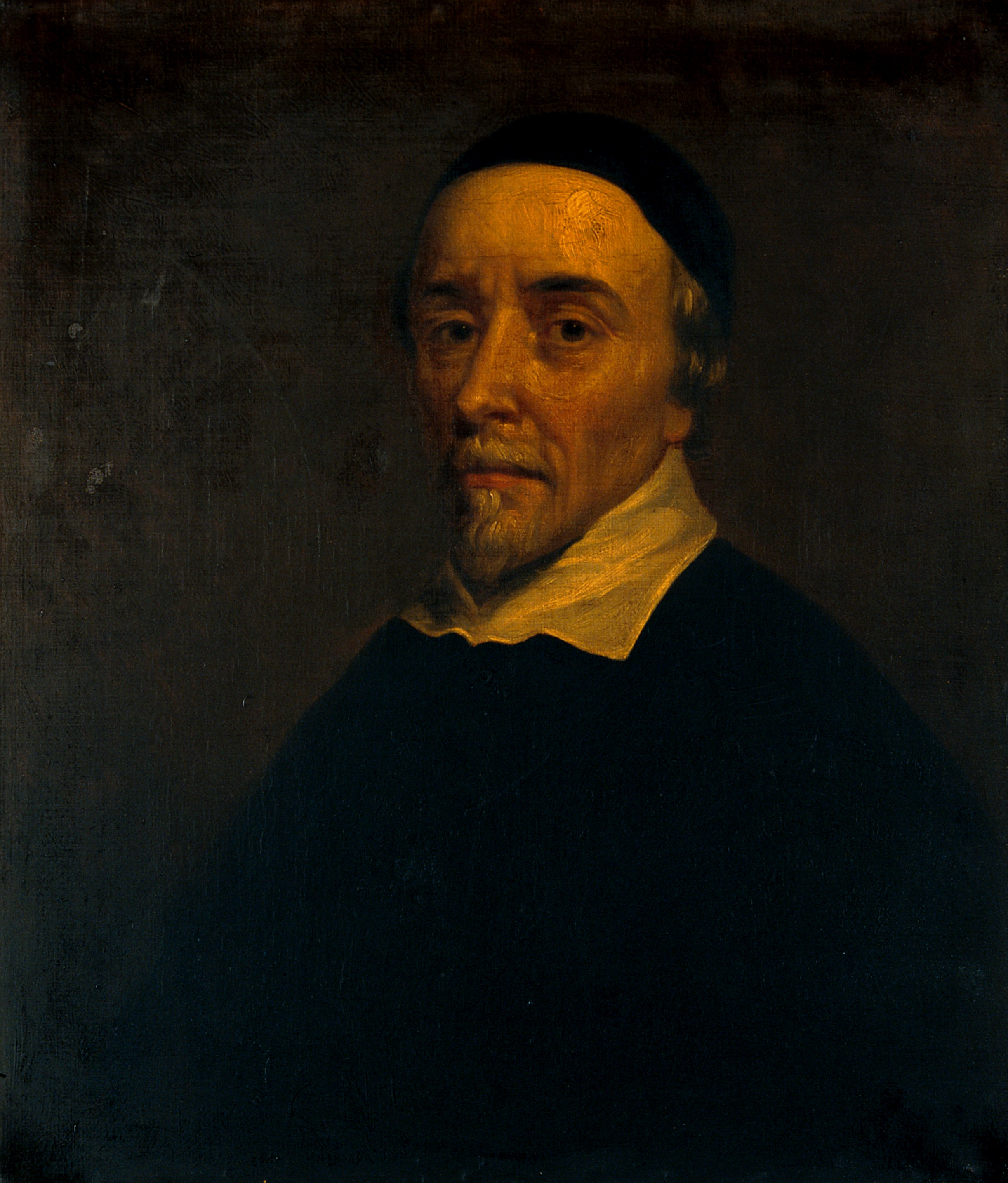
- William Harvey
- Formation: 1782
- Founder: Andrew Duncan, and others
- Type: Medical dining society
- Purpose: To celebrate the life and work of William Harvey and to encourage convivial relations between members of the medical profession
- Location(s): Royal College of Physicians of Edinburgh and Royal College of Surgeons of Edinburgh

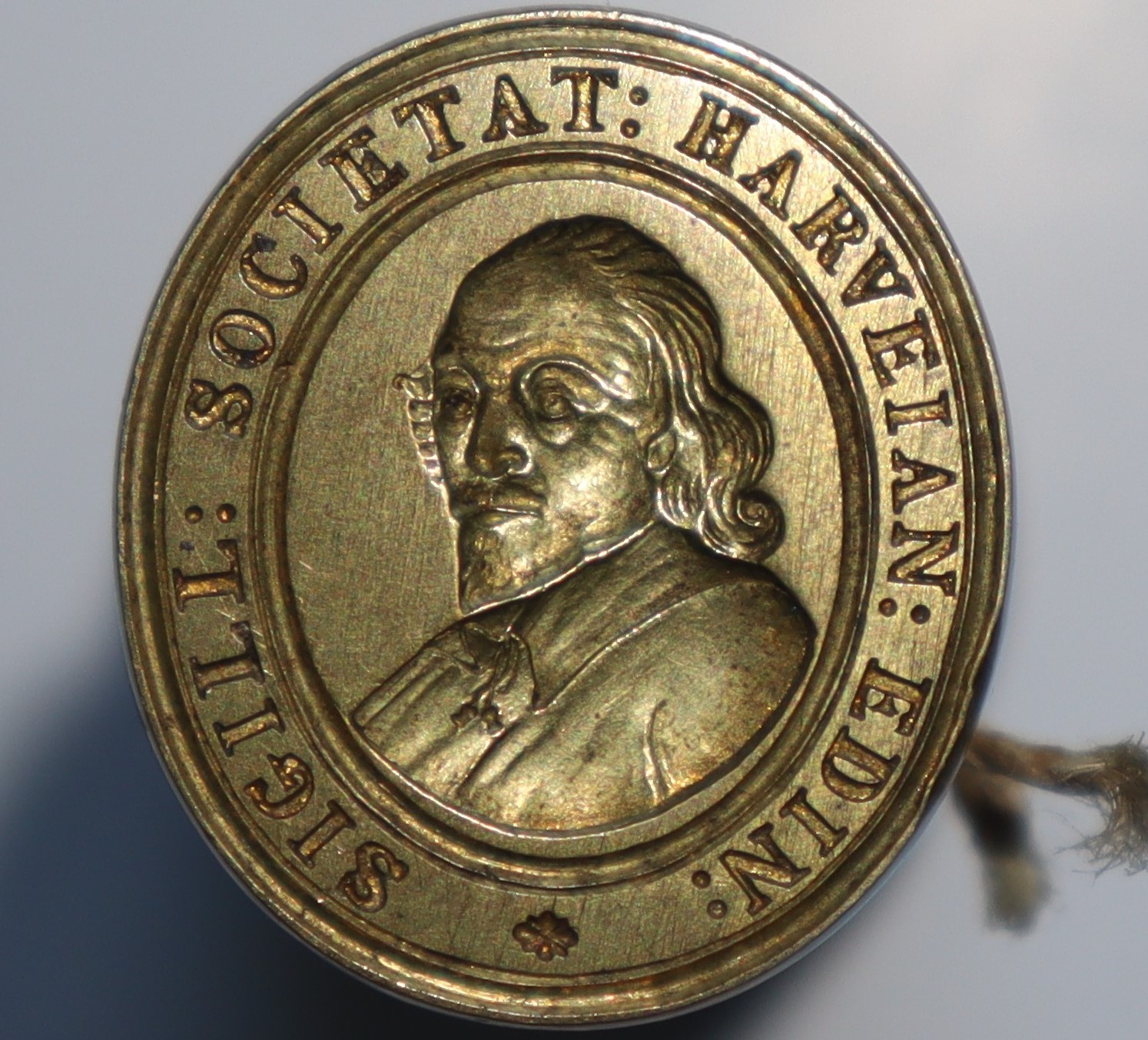
Sigill of the Harveian Society of Edinburgh

Letter of invitation to the Harveian Festival of 1934

The Harveian Society of Edinburgh was founded in April 1782 by Andrew Duncan. The society holds an annual festival in honour of the life and works of William Harvey, the physician who first correctly described the manner in which blood circulates around the human body. Until 1829, the society was known as the Circulation Club or the Harveian Club. Membership of the society is by invitation and members are doctors based primarily (but not exclusively) in Scotland. There are currently over 140 members, who are known as "Harveians".

== Harvey's links with Scotland ==
William Harvey visited Scotland in his role as physician to King Charles I in 1633 and 1641. During the first visit, he was granted the Freedom of the City of Edinburgh and was made an honorary member of the Incorporation of Surgeons (which later became the Royal College of Surgeons of Edinburgh). Harvey's work was championed by Archibald Pitcairne, a founding member of the Royal College of Physicians of Edinburgh and proponent of the establishment of a medical school in the University of Edinburgh. Pitcairne's own research, based on mathematical reasoning, provided strong support to Harvey's work by showing that all blood reaching the organs and periphery returned to the heart.

== Formation of the Society ==
The origins of the Harveian Society are closely linked with the Aesculapian Club, which was founded by Andrew Duncan in 1773. The Aesculapian Club offered a 'Harveian prize' for the best essay on a medical topic written by a student. The prize was initially a gold medal and later a copy of Harvey's works and a sum of money. The Aesculapian Club had a very small membership (initially 15 before rising to 22) and the funding of the prize was burdensome to its members. Duncan recognised that there was a need for a society with a wider membership. The Harveian Society was formed with the original purpose "to commemorate the discovery of the circulation of the blood by the circulation of the glass". In 1839 this was amended and became "to commemorate the discovery of the circulation of the blood, to cherish a kindly feeling among members of the Medical profession, and to foster a spirit of experimental enquiry among the students at this School of Medicine". The Harveian Society assumed responsibility for the Harveian Prize, which continued to be awarded at irregular intervals until 1865. A full list of the awarded prizes was compiled by Watson Wemyss. In 1875 the references to the Prize and students were removed from the laws of the society.

There were 23 original members of the society. The first meeting was held on 12 April 1782 (the anniversary of Harvey's birthday by the New Style dating system). Present at the first meeting were: Dr. Andrew Duncan, Dr. James Hamilton 'Senior', Mr. Benjamin Bell, Charles Webster, Mr. Alexander Wood, Mr. Andrew Wood, Thomas Hay, Mr Colin Lauder, Mr. William Anderson, William Inglis, James Gibson, Dr. Nathaniel Spens, Andrew Wardrop, Dr. Alexander Hamilton, Mr. Thomas Wood, Dr. Daniel Rutherford, Dr. Alexander Monro "Secundus", William Chalmer, and Dr. Robert Walker. Apologies for absence were received from: William Grieve, Robert Langlands, Mr. Forrest Dewar and James Hay. At that meeting, Duncan was elected President for the year and Secretary for life.

== Membership ==
Membership of the society was initially limited to 30 individuals who had to be Fellows of the Royal College of Physicians of Edinburgh or the Royal College of Surgeons of Edinburgh. In subsequent years the numerical limit on the size of the membership was removed and although the requirement for Fellowship of one the Edinburgh Colleges remained for those resident in the city ("the town"), membership was opened to medical professionals from neighbouring counties ("the country") and also to medical officers in the military. This gave rise to separate categories of "town" and "country" membership and for some time the president was selected alternately from the two categories. There is now no specific Fellowship requirement and Harveians are drawn from a broad array of medical specialities. The first women joined the society in 1998. Including current Harveians, there have been approximately 1400 members of the society since its formation.

== Office Bearers and Honorary Positions ==
The president of the society is elected at the annual business meeting, which is held every January. The president takes up office at the end of the Harveian Festival and is presented with the president's medal by the outgoing president. The medal was given to the society by Douglas Guthrie in 1956 and is a gold and enamel medallion depicting Harvey's personal coat of arms (or stemma) from his time as a student at the University of Padua. The role of President is held for 12 months and 14 individuals have been President on two occasions.

The society has two secretaries. These were sometimes known as the senior and junior secretaries (based on their length of service) and are now known as the Medical Secretary and the Surgical Secretary. There is no limit to their term of office and some have held the position for many years. Andrew Duncan served as Secretary for 46 years from 1782 to 1828. The Secretaries are responsible for the organisation of the annual Festival and the management of the financial affairs of the society.

The former positions of vice-president, croupier and treasurer have long lapsed.

It is a long-standing tradition that a member of the local clergy is invited to the festival and is given the honorific title of "Pontifex Maximus". The Pontifex Maximus is considered an honorary member of the society. The first recipient of the title was Rev. Dr. William Moodie in 1803. Subsequent holders of the role were Rev. William Greenfield, Rev. Prof. David Ritchie (resigned 1832), the Very Rev James Grant (1833-1890), the Very Rev. James MacGregor (1892-1910), the Very Rev. Wallace Williamson (1912-1926), the Very Rev. Charles Warr (1932-1969), the Very Rev. Henry Whitley (1970-1976), the Very Rev. John McIntyre (1977-1989), the Very Rev. Gilleasbuig Macmillan (1989-2014) and Rev. Calum Macleod (2015-2023). The current Pontifex Maximus is the Rev. Neil Gardner, Minister of Canongate Kirk, Edinburgh.

== Harveian Festival ==
The annual Harveian Festival is the focal point of the society's activities. As of 5 June 2026, there have been 229 Festivals. None was held in 1864 (following the death of Dr. John Coldstream), between 1915 and 1918 inclusive (due to World War I), in 1922, between 1940 and 1947 inclusive (due to World War II and post-war conditions) and in 2020 and 2021 (due to the government 's COVID-19 restrictions).

The festival was initially scheduled to occur on the birthday of Harvey (12 April (New Style) or 1 April (Old Style)). From 1895 the festival was held in late May or early June (near the anniversary of Harvey's death) and now is held consistently on the first Friday in June. The starting time of the festival has also changed, moving from 3pm to 5pm in 1852 and now 6.45pm. In 1967 dress code for the festival changed from full evening dress (white tie) to black tie.

The festival was originally held in various hotels in Edinburgh, but since 1889 has mainly been held in the Royal College of Physicians of Edinburgh. A bust of Harvey is placed in the lecture theatre during the Harveian oration and at dinner a terra-cotta statuette of Harvey with a faun (purchased by the society in 1889) is placed on the table next to the president.

During the formal dinner, a course that includes a dish of cooked heart is always served. New members (neophytes) are inducted into the Society following a light-hearted "invigilation" by a Harveian. Music is played throughout the dinner. Invigilations were historically carried out to the strains of Gounod's Funeral March of a Marionette, a tradition that was revived for the 226th Festival. Numerous toasts are made, including one to the "Immortal Memory" of Harvey. The final toast is always "Floreat res medica" (translation "let the medical field flourish"), which is a traditional toast said at the end of many medical dinners in Edinburgh and is attributed to Andrew Duncan.

Harveians are entitled to bring guests to the festival. In the past, the formal dinners included light-hearted betting as well as songs, stories and poems composed and performed by Harveians and guests. Non-medical guests who joined in heartily with the proceedings could be invited on multiple occasions and became honorary or associate members by acclamation. Senior Harveians who made significant contributions to the joviality of the proceedings were awarded the "Diploma of Doctor of Mirth" or "Merriment". Recipients of the Diploma included Dr. Andrew Duncan, Mr. Alexander Wood, Rev. Dr. William Moodie, Dr. Robert Freer, Dr. John Barclay, Mr Gilbert Innes of Stow, William Scott, Sir Andrew Douglas Maclagan and Mr. John Scott. The last recipient of the Diploma was Dr. William Seller in 1855. Three honorary Harveians, Sir Alex Boswell, Dr. R.K. Greville and Prof. John Wilson were awarded the honorific title of "Poet Laureate", while Sir Henry Raeburn was elected "Pictor".

== Harveian Orations ==
The early Harveian orations in Edinburgh predated the formation of the society. The first was delivered by Andrew Duncan in 1778 and was entitled 'De laudibus Guilielmi Harvie Oratio'. This was the only oration to date delivered in Latin. From 1782 to 1831, the Oration was given at irregular intervals at the Harveian Festival and generally by one of the Secretaries. Since then the Harveian Orations have generally been delivered annually by the president. There is no formal rule about the title or topic of the oration, although many have celebrated the life and works of Harvey. In the first century of the society's existence, orations often centred around the life and works of a historical figure, who may or may not have been a member of the medical profession. Notable individuals discussed included Sir Henry Raeburn, Archibald Pitcairne, Alexander Munro "Primus" and Sir Joseph Banks. During the late 19th and the first half of the 20th century, orations often considered a medical topic. In recent years, orations have tended to consider Harvey's work in the context of areas of medical practice related to the individual President. As of 5 June 2026, there have been 189 Harveian orations in Edinburgh.

== Other Medical Societies Named after William Harvey ==
In the United Kingdom, William Harvey's life and work is also commemorated by the Harveian Society of London and in the annual Harveian Oration at the Royal College of Physicians of London.

In North America, the Harvey Society of New York City hosts an annual lecture series on recent advances in biomedical sciences. The Harvey Club of London, based in Ontario, meets four times a year to present papers on medicine related to sciences, humanities and world events.

== Bibliography ==
- Wemyss, H. L. Watson (1933). A record of the Edinburgh Harveian Society. Edinburgh: T. & A. Constable.
