= James Musgrove =

Scottish anatomist

James Musgrove MD FRCS FRCSE LL.D(honorary) FRSE MRCS
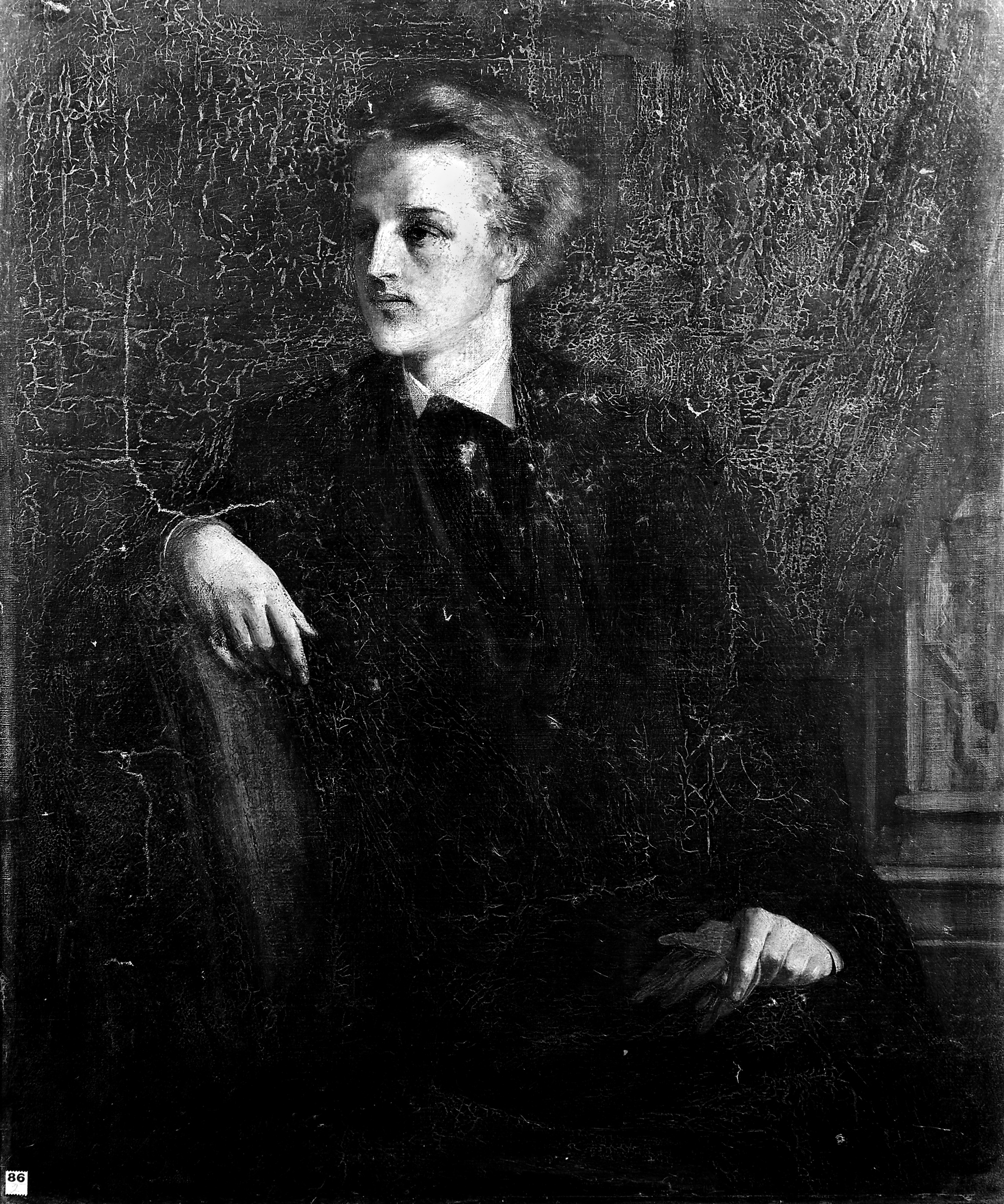
- Born: 18 October 1862; Kendal, Cumbria
- Died: 6 February 1935 (aged 72); St Andrews, Fife
- Education: University of Edinburgh
- Medical career
- Profession: Lecturer and first Bute Professor of Anatomy at St Andrews; Dean of Science Faculty
- Institutions: University of Edinburgh
- Sub-specialties: Anatomy

James Musgrove FRSE LLD (1862–1935) was a Scottish anatomist. He was the first holder of the Bute Chair of Anatomy at University of St Andrews, endowed by the third Marquess of Bute.

== Life ==
He was born in Kendal, in Cumbria, one of several children to Ruth (née Stramon) and William Musgrove, a draper.

After his schooling at Strannongate Science School in Kendal he studied medicine at the University of Edinburgh, graduating with an MB ChB in 1886. In 1887 he became the Royal Infirmary house surgeon under John Chiene. His industry and ability led Sir William Turner to accept him as demonstrator of anatomy at the University of Edinburgh for several years. Turner's effect on his education influenced him throughout his subsequent career. He gained his first doctorate (MD) from the University of St Andrews in 1888 and was admitted to membership of the Royal College of Surgeons in 1889.

His effectiveness in his various posts met with recognition, and he successively earned fellowships of the Royal College of Surgeons in 1893 and the Royal College of Surgeons of Edinburgh in 1894. In 1894 he moved to St Andrews to lecture in Anatomy. In 1901 Musgrove was appointed the first professor of anatomy at the University of St Andrews, a post endowed by the 3rd Marquess of Bute.

He was elected a Fellow of the Royal Society of Edinburgh in 1907. His proposers were William Carmichael McIntosh, Sir william Turner, Daniel John Cunningham and George Alexander Gibson.

In 1911 Musgrove married Elsa Bell Gray, the widow of the distinguished professor James Bell Pettigrew (d.1908). In Pettigrew's memory, Musgrove and his wife established a museum of anatomy for the University of St Andrews. It was generally regarded as an impressive work, reflecting Musgrove's artistic skills as well as his academic competence.

He retired due to ill-health in 1914. The Bute Chair was filled by Prof David Waterston. The University of St Andrews awarded him an honorary doctorate (LLD) in 1916.

He died on 6 February 1935 and was buried at St Andrews in the Eastern cemetery. He had no children.
