= David Waterston (anatomist) =

Scottish surgeon and anatomist

David Waterston OBE FRSE (25 August 1871–4 September 1942) was a 20th-century Scottish surgeon and anatomist. He was the Bute Professor of Anatomy at the University of St Andrews. He was one of the first to debunk the Piltdown Man hoax, correctly pointing out that the jaw and skull did not match correctly.

== Life ==
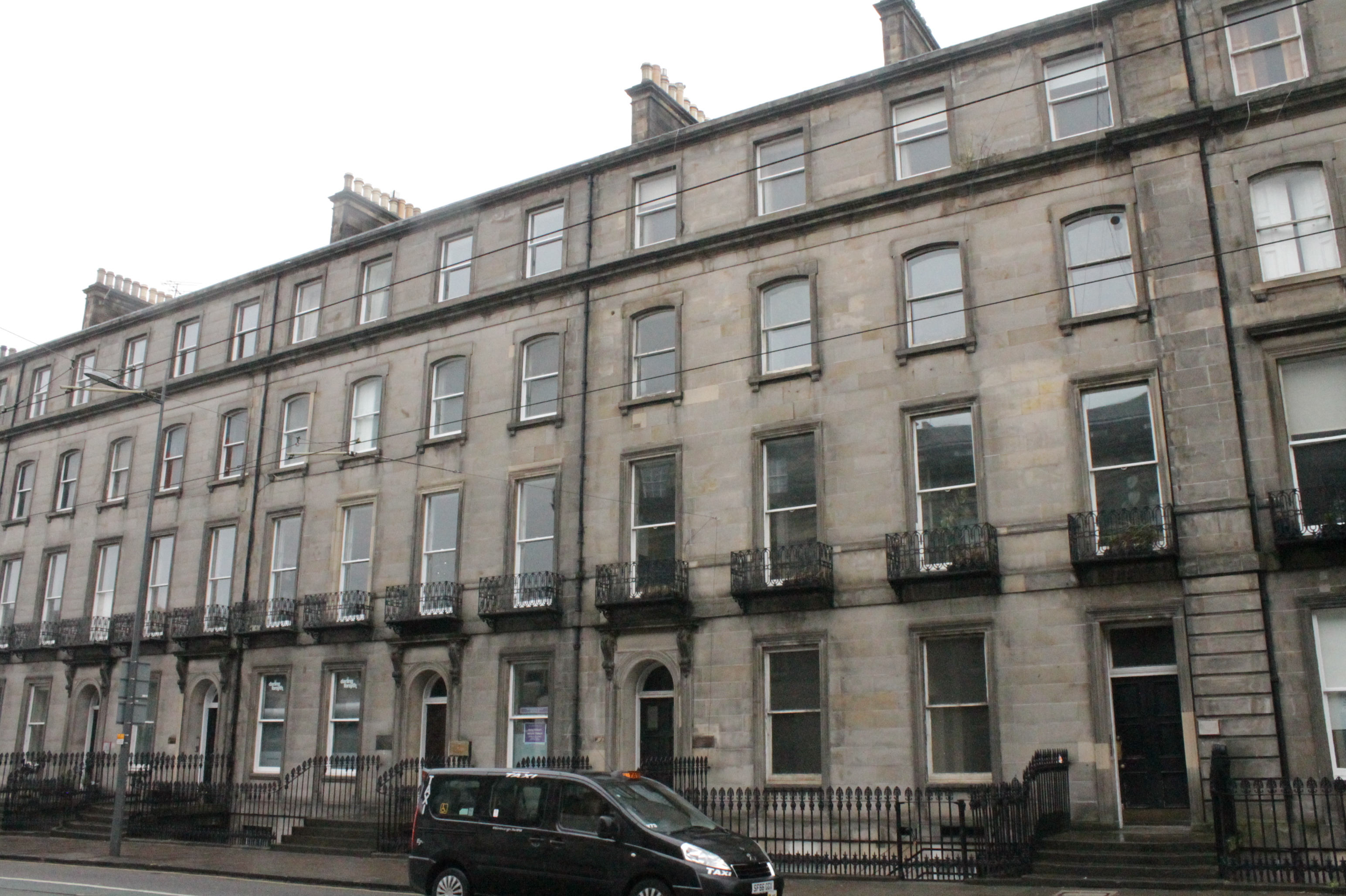
1 Coates Place, Edinburgh (right)

Waterston was born in Govan, Glasgow on 25 August 1871 the son of Isabella Anderson and her husband Rev Richard Waterston (1830-1892) of Union Church on Morrison Street. The family lived at 2 Park Grove on the Paisley Road. His father moved to St Paul's Church in Dundee in 1878. The family later lived at 2 Park Place in Dundee.

He studied for a general degree at the University of Edinburgh, the home town of his parents, graduating with an MA around 1890. He then studied medicine under Sir William Turner graduating with an MB ChB in 1895. He then began lecturing in anatomy at the university alongside David Hepburn. He gained his doctorate (MD) in 1898, and won the Royal College of Surgeons of Edinburgh's Gold Medal in 1900. In 1900 he was living at 16 Merchiston Terrace in west Edinburgh.

In 1901 he was elected a Fellow of the Royal Society of Edinburgh. His proposers were Sir William Turner, Ramsay Heatley Traquair, Robert Munro, and David Hepburn.

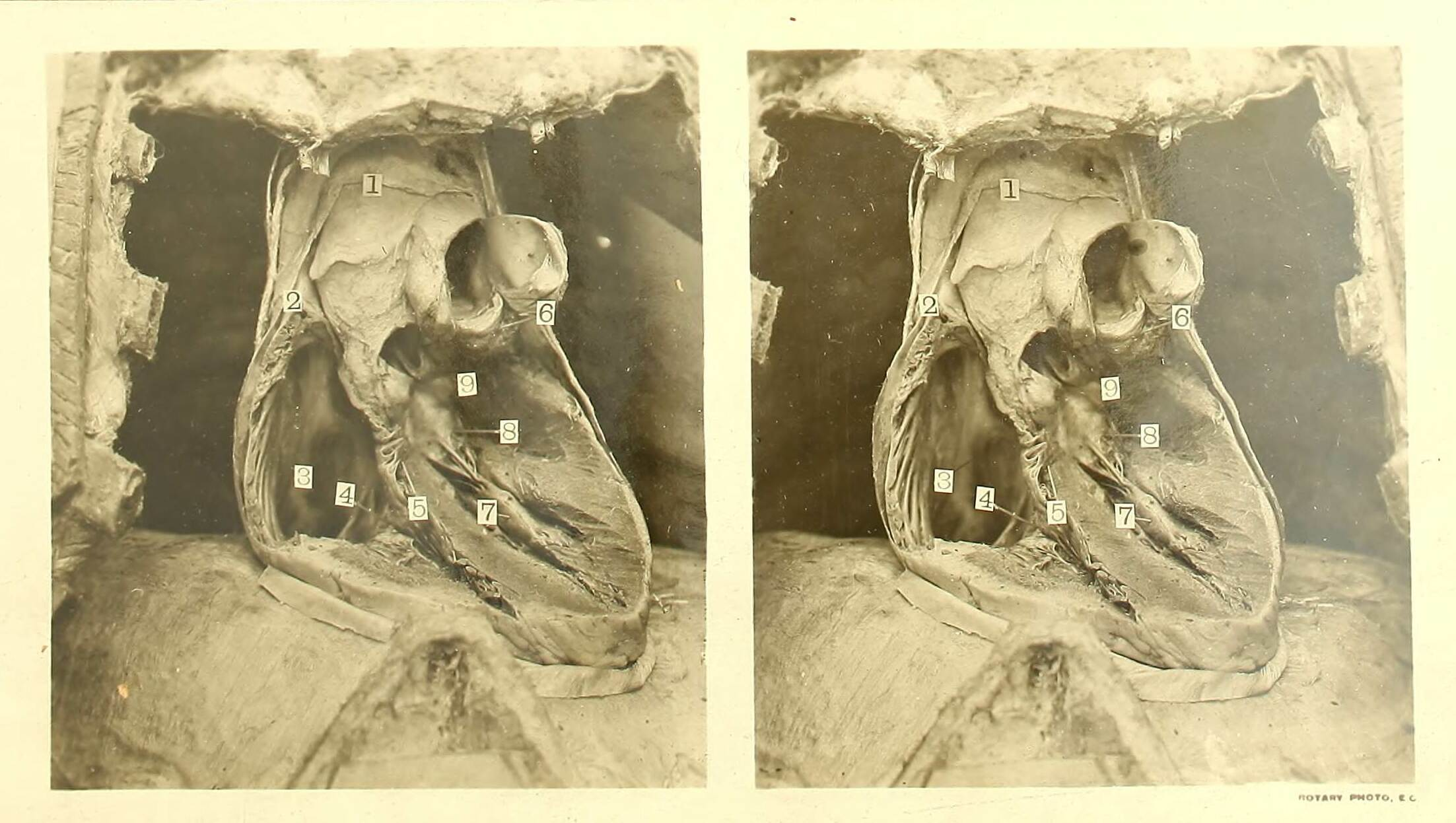
Stereoscopic view of a dissection of the heart and pericardium, from Waterston (1905)

In 1905 he published the Edinburgh Stereoscopic Atlas of Anatomy. As its name suggests, this work used stereographic photographs to provide a three-dimensional view of anatomical preparations. It was widely used by Scottish medical schools.

In 1909 he was still working in Edinburgh and lived at 1 Coates Place in the West End of the city, a large terraced townhouse in the West End of the City.

He was Professor of Anatomy at King's College, London from around 1910. During this period he came to national fame in 1913 as the first person to discredit the Piltdown Man hoax which had been made public in December 1912.

In 1914 he became the Bute Professor of Anatomy at the University of St Andrews, succeeding Professor James Musgrove.

He died on 4 September 1942. When he died there was an inter-regnum in the Bute chair due to the World War II. He was eventually succeeded in 1946 by Professor Robert Walmsley.

== Family ==
He was married to Isabel Amy Simsom. Their children included Brigadier Surgeon Richard E. Waterston FRCS and David James Waterston FRCSE.

== Selected bibliography ==
- Waterston, David (1905). Edinburgh Stereoscopic Atlas of Anatomy. London: The Caxton Publishing Company. Section 1; Section 2; Section 3; Section 4; Section 5.
- —— (1907). "Complete bilateral interruption of the fissure of Rolando". Journal of Anatomy and Physiology. 41: 143–146. PMC 1289106. PMID 17232720.
- —— (1913). "The Piltdown Mandible". Nature. 92 (2298): 319. doi:10.1038/092319a0.
- —— (1927). "A Stone Cist and its Contents found at Piekie Farm, near Boarhills, Fife". Proceedings of the Society of Antiquaries of Scotland. 61: 30–44.
- —— (1928). Gastro-intestinal Diseases: Lectures Delivered at the James MacKenzie Institute for Clinical Research, St. Andrews, Winter Session, 1927. H. Milford. OCLC 9850799.
- —— (1931). Anatomy in the living model : a handbook for the study of the surface, movements, and mechanics of the human body. Hodder and Stoughton. OCLC 930476905.
- —— (1933). "On pain". The Lancet. 221: 943–946. doi:10.1016/S0140-6736(00)85035-7.
- —— (1933). "Observations on sensation: The sensory functions of the skin for touch and pain". The Journal of Physiology. 77 (3): 251–257. doi:10.1113/jphysiol.1933.sp002967. PMC 1394770. PMID 16994388.
- ——; Orr, James; Cappell, D.F. (1939). "Sir James Mackenzie's heart". British Heart Journal. 1 (3): 237–248. doi:10.1136/hrt.1.3.237. PMC 503856. PMID 18609821.
