= Edward Fawcett (anatomist) =

British skeleton scientist

Edward Fawcett (18 May 1867 – September 1942 (Note: Sources conflict as to his precise date of death; his Royal Society and British Medical Journal obituaries give 23 September, those in Nature and The Times give 22 September, and that in the Bristol Medico-Chirurgical Journal gives 21 September.)) was a British anatomist and embryologist, known for his research into the mammalian skeleton, particularly the skull and its developmental precursor structure, the chondrocranium. He held the chair in human anatomy at the University of Bristol (1893–1934) and was Dean of the university's Faculty of Medicine (1905–34). He was an elected fellow of the Royal Society (1923) and president of the Anatomical Society of Great Britain and Ireland (1927–29). The physiologist Henry Dale describes him as a "foremost authority on the morphology and development of the mammalian skeleton".

== Education and career ==
Fawcett was born on 18 May 1867 at Little Blencoe, near Penrith in Cumberland, to Hannah Maria (née Lambert) and Thomas Fawcett, the headmaster of Blencoe or Blencow Grammar School. He had a younger sister. After attending Blencoe Grammar, he read medicine at the University of Edinburgh (1885–89), where he was inspired by the anatomist William Turner, gaining an MB, CM degree (1889) and later an MD (1906), winning a gold medal for his MD thesis.

He worked as demonstrator in anatomy (1887–89) while studying. On graduation, he entered medical practice but soon left it to become a demonstrator in anatomy at Yorkshire College in Leeds, where he worked for Wardrop Griffith. In 1893 he went to University College, Bristol (the University of Bristol from 1909) to take up the chair of anatomy, becoming the college's first full-time anatomy professor, and also served as Dean of the Faculty of Medicine (1905–34). He was credited with having a significant role in restructuring the medical faculty on the transition to university status in 1909. He held both positions until his retirement in 1934, after which he was made an emeritus professor.

He served on the General Medical Council and was the president of the Anatomical Society of Great Britain and Ireland (1927–29). (Note: His Times obituary states he was twice president, but this is not supported in other sources.) He delivered the Long Fox Lecture in Bristol (1910) and the Arris and Gale Lecture of the Royal College of Surgeons (1912), and was elected a fellow of the Royal Society in 1923.

== Research ==
His research was in anatomy and embryology, particularly osteology. It focused on bone development, including that of the clavicle (shoulder girdle) and sacrum, as well as epiphyses, including those in the skeleton of the head and trunk. He showed, for example, that the clavicle has two separate foci of cartilage formation. His later work, for which he was best known, focused on the bones of the adult skull and particularly on the chondrocranium – the cartilaginous precursor to the skull in the embryo and foetus – of a range of mammals including humans. This research used larger-than-life-sized reconstructions in wax, based on observing consecutive cross-sections under the microscope, a technique developed by the Swiss anatomist, Wilhelm His. It was published in a series of papers in the Journal of Anatomy, which unusually for the time were illustrated with high-quality colour plates. This work was interrupted in 1923 by the development of an inflammatory response to xylol in his hands. His models and slides were destroyed by bombing in 1940–41.

He published on the skeleton of Patrick Cotter, a man buried in Bristol whom he diagnosed as having had acromegalic gigantism, as well as on his examinations of various archeological finds of human bones. Fawcett was interested in archeological surveys of caves, and served as first president of the University of Bristol Spelæological Society (1919–36), which he co-founded. The society surveyed Aveline's Hole in Burrington Combe, Somerset, finding fossils, tools and human and animal bones; it established a museum at the department of anatomy, which was also destroyed by air-raids.

The physiologist Henry Dale describes Fawcett as a "foremost authority on the morphology and development of the mammalian skeleton". The anatomist J. M. Yoffey describes his research, in an obituary for Nature, as representing "fundamental and extensive contributions" to knowledge of the anatomy of the mammalian chondrocranium. The anatomist Arthur Keith, in his Royal Society obituary, writes that Fawcett's goal was to "provide accurate data to serve as a foundation for generalizations", rather than himself drawing conclusions, and Yoffey characterises his research as displaying an "unremitting attention to detail".

== Personal life ==
He married Edith Dora Wordsworth in 1895; they had a daughter, Dorothy, and a son, Alan Wordsworth Fawcett, who became a surgeon at Sheffield Royal Infirmary.

He was an amateur photographer and, in retirement, took photographs recording the architecture of medieval buildings, particularly churches, as well as ecclesiastical furnishings and heraldry, across Gloucestershire, Somerset, Wiltshire and the city of Bristol. He became an expert on medieval mouldings and ornament, and was particularly interested in ecclesiastical depictions of the royal arms, anthropophagous stone statues on church exteriors, and the historical development of the chair. He served as president of the Bristol and Gloucester Archaeological Society (1936), and was on the Bristol Diocesan Board as well as the Central Council for the Preservation of Churches. His other interests included cricket, golf, cycling, music and carpentry. He purchased a cricket pavilion to serve as a hut for the University of Bristol Spelæological Society.

He died unexpectedly from a ruptured abdominal aneurysm on 21, 22 or 23 September 1942 in Bristol.

== Selected publications ==
- Edward Fawcett (1938). The sexing of the human sacrum. Journal of Anatomy 72 (4): 633 PMC 1252370
- Edward Fawcett (1918). The primordial cranium of Erinaceus europaeus. Journal of Anatomy 52 (2): 211–50 PMC 1262834
- Edward Fawcett (1909). Patrick Cotter—The Bristol Giant. Journal of the Royal Anthropological Institute of Great Britain and Ireland 39: 196–208 JSTOR 2843291, doi:10.2307/2843291
- Edward Fawcett (1905). Ossification of the lower jaw in man. Journal of the American Medical Association XLV (10): 696–705 doi:10.1001/jama.1905.52510100030002d
