= Arthur Robinson (anatomist) =

British anatomist

Arthur Robinson FRSE FRCS FRCSE LLD (1862–1948) was a British anatomist who served as President of the Anatomical Society of Great Britain and Ireland 1920 to 1922. He created the terms "opposed placentae" and "conjoined placentae".

== Life ==
He was born on 8 April 1862 in Manchester, the son of James Robinson.

He studied medicine at the University of Edinburgh graduating MBChB in 1883. He then became a Demonstrator in William Turner's anatomy class. He then went to Owen's College in Manchester as a Demonstrator to Professor A.H. Young and the Victoria University in Manchester. He received his doctorate (MD) from the University of Edinburgh in 1890.

In 1896 he went to Middlesex Hospital in London replacing John Bland-Sutton as a lecturer in anatomy. In 1900 he went to King's College, London as Professor of Anatomy. In 1905 he moved to the University of Birmingham as Professor of Anatomy and Sub-Dean of the Faculty of Medicine. In 1909 he returned to the University of Edinburgh to replace Daniel John Cunningham as Professor of Anatomy.

In 1910 he was elected a Fellow of the Royal Society of Edinburgh. His proposers were Sir William Turner, George Chrystal, Cargill Gilston Knott, and John Sutherland Black. He served as Secretary to the Society 1912 to 1918 and as Vice President 1918 to 1921. He won the Society's Neill Prize for the period 1925/27.

He received an honorary doctorate (LLD) in 1932 for his books.

He died in Eastbourne on 3 December 1948.

== Family ==
In 1888 he married Emily Baily. They had no children.

== Publications ==
He was editor to the numerous revisions of Cunningham's Manual of Practical Anatomy and Cunningham's Textbook of Anatomy

- A Glance at Anatomy 1705 to 1909 (1909)
- Surface Anatomy (1928)
