= Arthur Logan Turner =

Scottish surgeon (1865–1939)

Arthur Logan Turner FRCSEd FRSE
- Born: 4 May 1865; Edinburgh, Scotland
- Died: 6 June 1939 (aged 74); Edinburgh, Scotland
- Occupation: ENT Surgeon
- Known for: Textbook of ENT Surgery

Academic background
- Education: Fettes College
- Alma mater: University of Edinburgh

Academic work
- Notable works: Diseases of the Nose, Throat, and Ear, for Practitioners and Students; The Story of a Great Hospital: The Royal Infirmary of Edinburgh 1729 to 1929

Arthur Logan Turner (4 May 1865 – 6 June 1939) was a Scottish surgeon, who specialised in diseases of ear, nose and throat (ENT) and was one of the first surgeons to work at the purpose-built ENT Pavilion at the Royal Infirmary of Edinburgh. During his surgical career he published a series of clinical papers and wrote a textbook of ENT surgery which proved popular around the world and ran to several editions. After retiring from surgical practice he pursued his interest in the history of medicine writing a biography of his father and histories of the Royal Infirmary of Edinburgh and the University of Edinburgh. As his father had been before him, he was elected President of the Royal College of Surgeons of Edinburgh. His collection of pathological specimens was donated to Surgeon's Hall Museum in Edinburgh.

== Early life ==
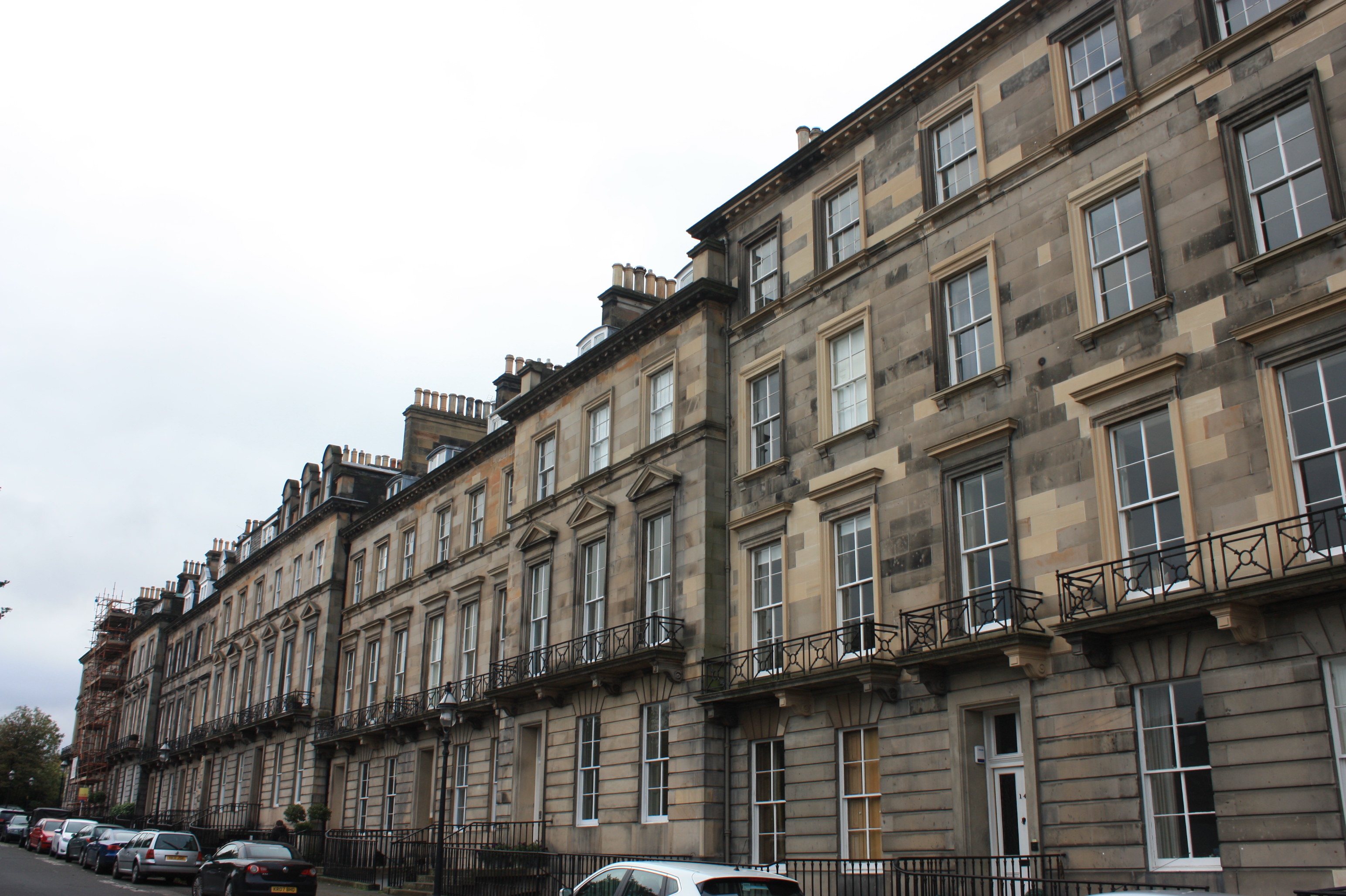
Eton Terrace, Edinburgh

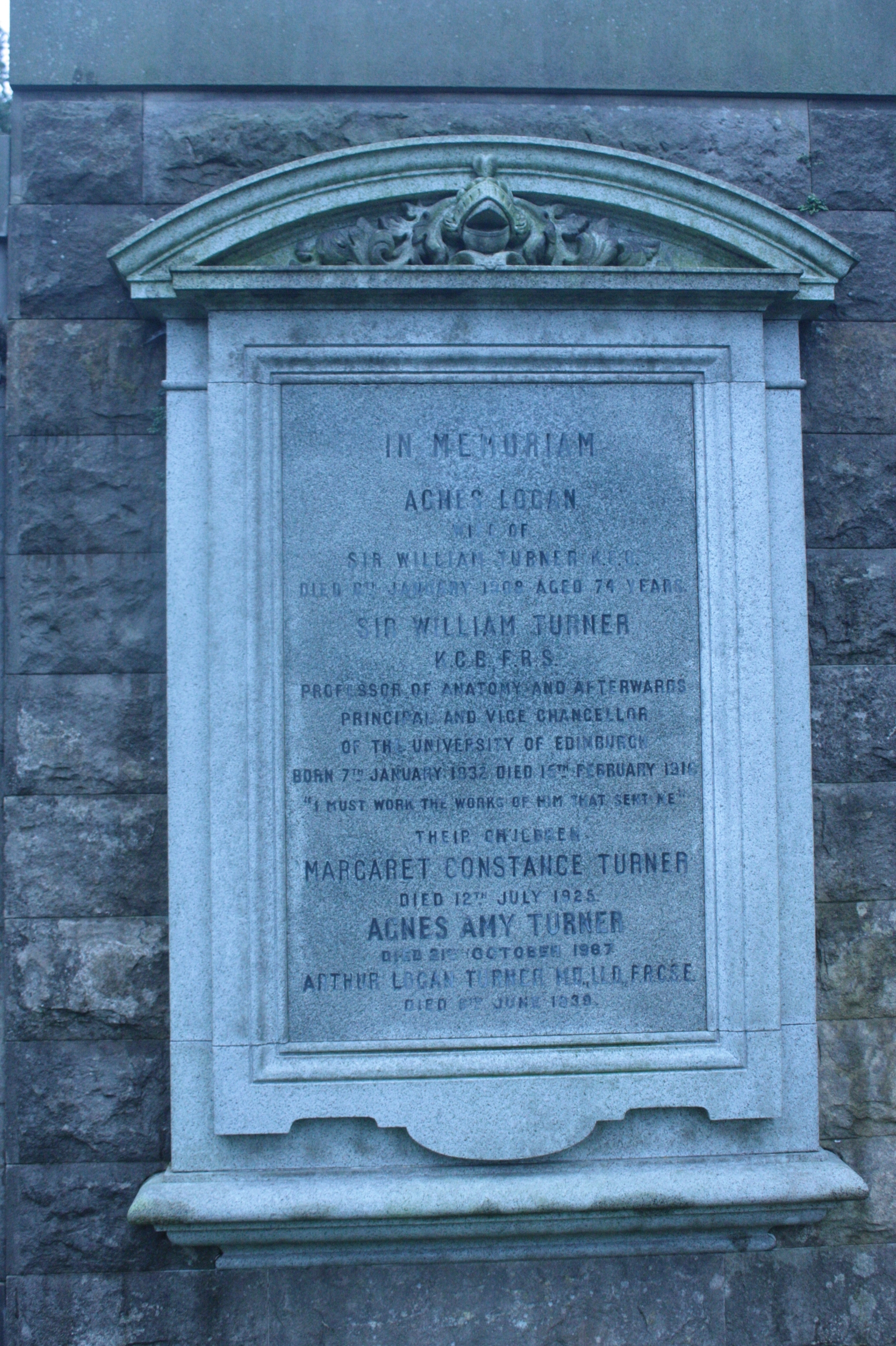
The grave of Arthur Turner at Dean Cemetery, along with his parents and siblings

He was born in Edinburgh, Scotland on 4 May 1865 to William Turner and his wife Agnes Turner (née) Logan. His father, later Sir Turner, would go on to become professor of anatomy and then principal of the University of Edinburgh and president of the Royal College of Surgeons of Edinburgh. Arthur went to school at Fettes College then studied medicine at the University of Edinburgh graduating MB CM in 1889. In childhood he lived at 6 Eton Terrace and In later life at 27 Walker Street in Edinburgh's West End.

== Surgical career ==
He became house surgeon and later clinical tutor to Thomas Annandale, the Regius professor of clinical surgery and was elected a fellow of the Royal College of Surgeons of Edinburgh in 1891. He was awarded the degree of M.D. by the University of Edinburgh in 1894. Having decided on a career in ear, nose and throat surgery he was appointed surgeon for diseases of the ear, nose and throat to the Deaconess Hospital, and in 1903 he became an assistant surgeon at the newly built Ear, Nose and Throat Pavilion at Edinburgh Royal Infirmary of Edinburgh, graduating to full surgeon in 1906. During the First World War he served in the Royal Army Medical Corps (RAMC) acting as laryngologist to the Second Scottish General Hospital in Edinburgh, which later became the Western General Hospital.

Turner was editor of the University of Edinburgh Journal for ten years, from 1928 to 1937.

His textbook Diseases of the Nose, Throat and Ear was first published in 1924. This proved so popular that it ran to several editions during Turner's lifetime which he continued to edit. An 11th edition, now entitled Logan Turner's Diseases of the Nose, Throat and Ear, Head and Neck Surgery was published in 2015.

His collection of pathological specimens was donated to Surgeon's Hall Museum in Edinburgh and is known as the Arthur Logan Turner Collection.

== Medical historian ==
After retiring from his surgical career, Turner devoted much of his time and energy to the history of medicine. He wrote the definitive biography of his father Sir William Turner, K.C.B.: A Chapter in Medical History which was published in 1919. To commemorate the 100th anniversary of the birth of Joseph Lister he edited a memorial work, Joseph, Baron Lister, A Centenary Volume, 1827-1927.

In 1933 when the University of Edinburgh celebrated the 350th anniversary of its foundation Turner produced The History of the University of Edinburgh, 1883-1933, a continuation of the history of that institution by Sir Alexander Grant which had been published fifty years earlier.

== Awards and recognition ==
In 1905 he was elected a Fellow of the Royal Society of Edinburgh. His proposers were Daniel John Cunningham, George Chrystal, James Geikie and Henry Littlejohn. He served as vice president of the society 1930 to 1933.

In 1924 he was elected a member of the Aesculapian Club. He was also elected a member of the Harveian Society of Edinburgh. As his father had been before him he was elected president of the Royal College of Surgeons of Edinburgh in 1925 in succession to Professor Harold Stiles. In recognition of his academic contributions he received the degree of LLD from the University of Edinburgh.

He was president of the Medico-Chirurgical Society of Edinburgh in 1927 and president of the Sections of Laryngology and Otology in the Royal Society of Medicine, London. President of the Section of Laryngology at the British Medical Association Meeting in Edinburgh in 1927. He was made a corresponding Fellow of the American Laryngological Association, an honorary Member of the Austrian Otological Society and a corresponding Member of the French Society of Otology and Laryngology.

== Later life and death ==
Turner never married. He died in Edinburgh on 6 June 1939. He is buried with his parents in Dean Cemetery. The grave lies in the north section, backing onto the dividing wall with the original cemetery.

== Selected publications ==
- Diseases of the Nose, Throat and Ear for practitioners and students. Bristol. John Wright and Sons Ltd (1924)
- Intracranial Pyogenic Diseases:: A Pathological and Clinical Study of the Pathways of Infection from the Face, the Nasal and Paranasal Air-cavities Edinburgh: Oliver & Boyd (1931)
- Sir William Turner KCB; a chapter in medical history. Edinburgh and London. William Blackwood & Sons (1919)
- The History of the University of Edinburgh 1883-1933 Edinburgh. Oliver & Boyd (1933)
- The Story of a Great Hospital: The Royal Infirmary of Edinburgh 1729 to 1929. Edinburgh. Oliver and Boyd (1930)
