= Mary Lucas Keene =

Mary Frances Keene FRCS (née Lucas, 15 August 1885 – 9 May 1977) was professor of anatomy at the London School of Medicine for Women, the first woman professor of anatomy in the United Kingdom, first woman president of the Anatomical Society of Great Britain and Ireland, and a president of the Medical Women's Federation.

== Early life and education ==
Mary Frances Lucas was born in Gravesend, Kent, on 15 August 1885, to parents George John Lucas and Annie Martin Lucas (née Constant). She was educated at a school in Eversley, Folkestone, Kent.

Lucas entered the London School of Medicine for Women in the winter of 1904, and graduated in 1911. She joined the Anatomical Society of Great Britain and Ireland in 1913 and had a brief clinical career after leaving education.

== Medical career ==
At the outbreak of war in 1914, Lucas was invited back to the London School of Medicine for Women to work as a Lecturer in Embryology and Senior Demonstrator in Anatomy, as well as Assistant to the Professor of Anatomy Frederic Wood Jones. His wartime World War I work at the military hospital in Shepherd's Bush meant that increasingly Lucas was left on her own to run the department, and she became acting head of the department. During two summer vacations Lucas travelled with the Dean of the school and surgeon, Louisa Aldrich-Blake, to volunteer at Royaumont Abbey in northern France, where the Scottish Women's Hospitals for Foreign Service ran a large hospital for casualties.

In 1916 she married Richard Keene and adopted the surname Lucas Keene in 1917. In 1919, she was appointed head of department when Wood Jones moved to Manchester.

After the war, Keene spent most of her career working in the anatomy department. Her roles included lecturer, senior demonstrator and head of department. In 1924 she was appointed Professor of Anatomy and it was widely reported at the time that she was the first female professor of anatomy in the UK and USA.

She was elected president of the Medical Women's Federation and held the role from 1946 to 1948. She was also the first woman president of the Anatomical Society of Great Britain and Ireland. She was appointed Emeritus Professor of the University of London in 1951.

In 1956 she was elected a Fellow of the Royal College of Surgeons. She was also admitted to the Worshipful Society Apothecaries of London and to the Freedom of the City of London by Redemption.

== Death and legacy ==
Mary Frances Lucas Keene died on 9 May 1977 in Dover, Kent.

== Published works ==
- Keene, M. F. Lucas and Hewer, E. E. (October 1931) Some Observations on Myelination in the Human Central Nervous System Journal of Anatomy 1931;6:1–13.
- Keene, Mary F. Lucas; Whillis, J. (1950) Anatomy for Dental Students; Published by Edward Arnold & Co.
