= Morrison Watson =

Scottish anatomist (1845–1885)

Professor Morrison Watson FRS FRSE FRCPE

Personal details
- Born: 1845 Montrose, Forfarshire, Scotland
- Died: 25 March 1885 (aged 39–40) Manchester, England
- Occupation: Anatomist, physician

Morrison Watson (1845 – 25 March 1885) was a Scottish anatomist and comparative anatomist.

== Life ==
Watson was born in Montrose in 1845. He was educated at the Edinburgh Institution, going on to study medicine at the University of Edinburgh, where he took the degree of Doctor of Medicine in 1867. He then undertook postgraduate studies at Berlin and Vienna (he must have been competent in German).

Around 1865 he returned to the University of Edinburgh, working as a Demonstrator in the Anatomy classes, and as assistant to William Turner.

In 1873 he was elected a Fellow of the Royal Society of Edinburgh. His proposer was William Turner.

Aged 29 he 1874 he moved to Manchester to take on the role of Professor of Descriptive and Practical Anatomy at Owen's College. While there he worked alongside Arthur Gamgee.

At Owen's College he rose to be Dean.

He was elected a Fellow of the Royal Society of London in 1884.

He died of a "fatal illness" in Manchester on 25 March 1885. He did not have any family and left no will.

== Publications ==
- Observations in Human and Comparative Anatomy (1874)
- The Anatomy of the Northern Beluga
