= John Bland-Sutton =

British surgeon

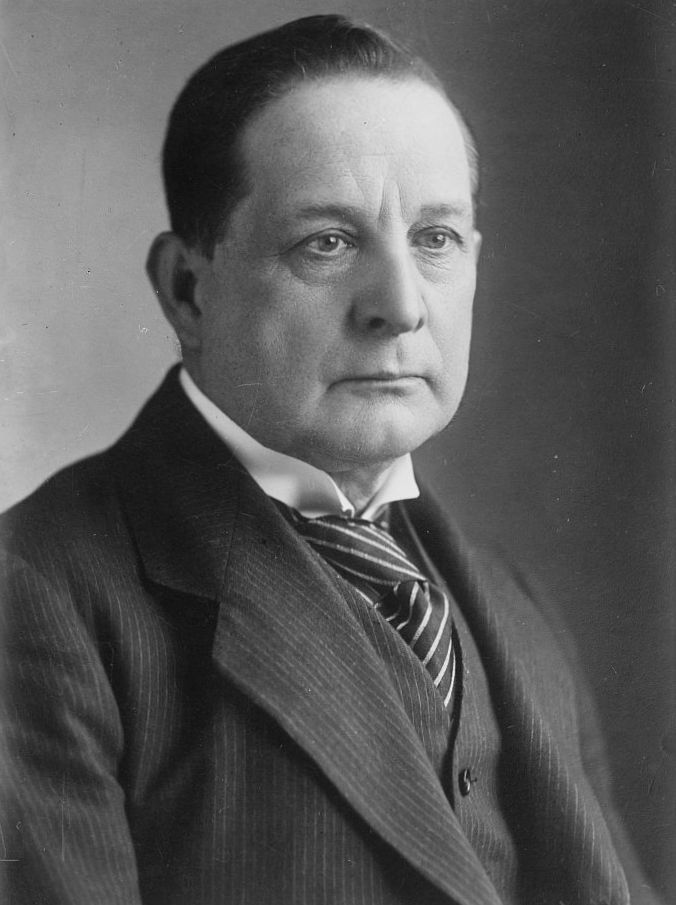
Sir John Bland-Sutton

Sir John Bland-Sutton, 1st Baronet (21 April 1855 – 20 December 1936), was a British surgeon.

== Biography ==
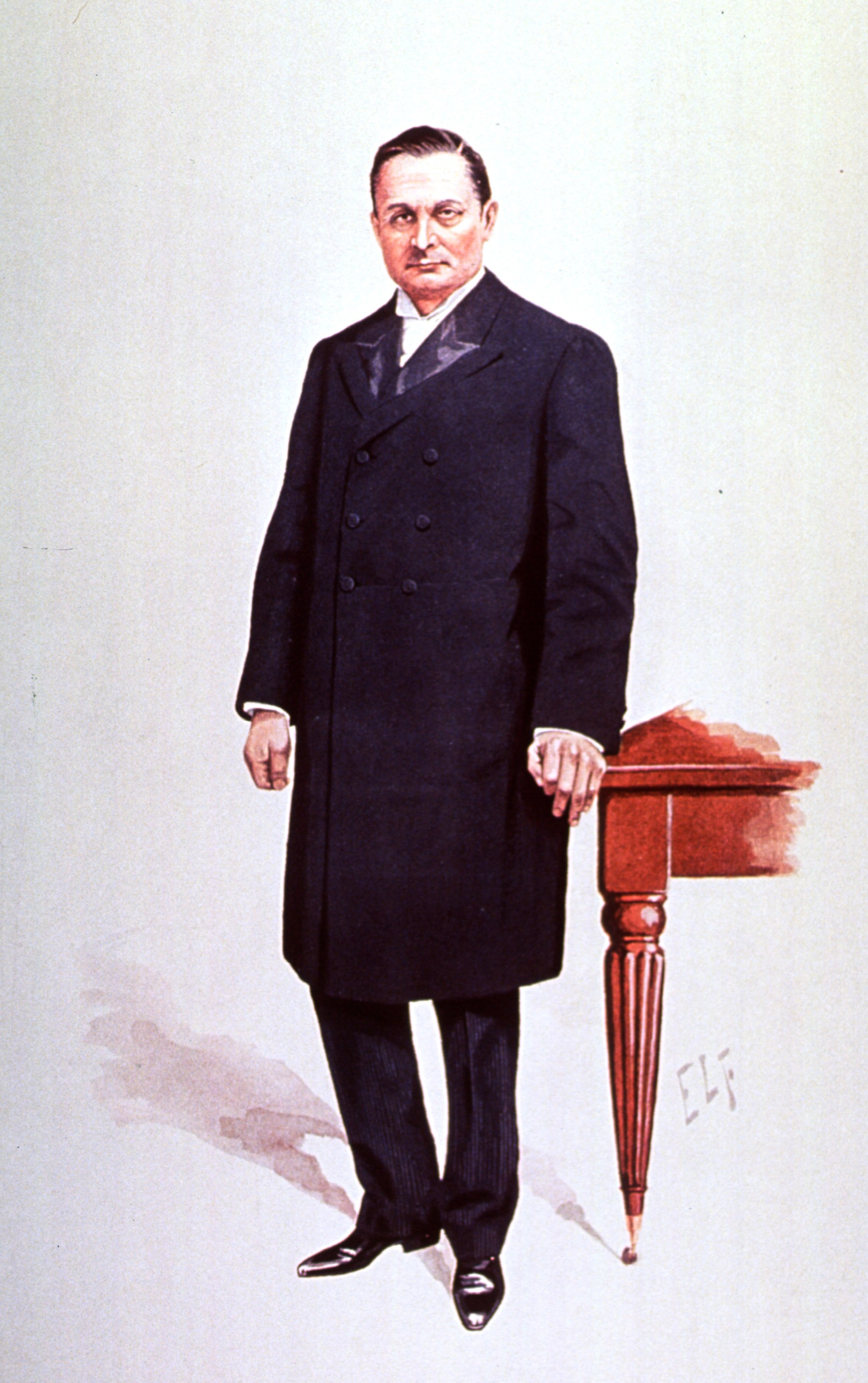
Portrait of Dr. Bland Sutton

He was the son of Enfield Highway farmer Charles William Sutton and was educated at the local school. From there, he entered a private anatomy school run by Thomas Cooke, teaching anatomy to earn money so he could study at the Middlesex Hospital. There, he became a lecturer. He did this job from 1886 to 1896. In 1886, he also became an Assistant Surgeon, specializing in pelvic operations on women. In 1889, he changed his name from John Bland Sutton to John Bland-Sutton. In 1896, he was replaced as Lecturer in Anatomy at Middlesex Hospital by Arthur Robinson.

In 1899, Bland-Sutton was asked to investigate why litters of lion cubs at the London Zoo were dying with a presentation that included rickets. He recommended that the diets of the pregnant and nursing females and the weaned cubs be switched from lean horse meat to goat - including calcium- and phosphorus-containing bones - and cod liver oil, solving the problem. Subsequently, researchers realized that animal models such as dogs and rats could be used for rickets research, leading to the identification and naming of the responsible vitamin in 1922.

In 1905, he was appointed Surgeon at the Middlesex Hospital, resigning in 1920 to become Consulting Surgeon.

Knighted on 1 July 1912, Bland-Sutton was President of the Royal Society of Medicine between 1920 and 1922 and of the Royal College of Surgeons of England from 1923 to 1925. He delivered the Bradshaw lecture at the Royal College of Surgeons in 1917. Interested in zoology, he served as vice-President of the Zoological Society of London. In the 1925 Birthday Honours he was created a Baronet, of the Middlesex Hospital in the County of London.

He married twice; firstly in 1886 to Agnes Hobbs of Didcot, and secondly in 1899 to Edith Goff Bigg (1865-1943), the younger daughter of Henry Heather Bigg. They had no children and his title became extinct.

He died in December 1936 and at his own request his ashes were given to the Museum of the Middlesex Hospital.

== Arms ==
Coat of arms of Bland-Sutton of Middlesex Hospital
Crest On a wreath of the colours, upon a scimitar as in the arms, a swallow Proper. Escutcheon Per chevron Azure and Gules, in chief two swallows Proper, and in base three scimitars Argent, pommels and hilts Or Motto Spes et audax

== Selected works ==
- Ligaments (1887)
- Evolution and disease (1890)
- Tumours, innocent and malignant (1893); several editions
- Diseases of women (1897)
- Gall-stones and diseases of the bile-ducts (1907)
- Man and beast in eastern Ethiopia (1911)
- Selected lectures and essays (1920)
- Orations and addresses (1924)
- The story of a surgeon (1930)
- Men and creatures in Uganda (1933)

Baronetage of the United Kingdom
New creation	Baronet (of the Middlesex Hospital); 1925–1936	Extinct
