= Aglionby Ross Carson =

Carson, Aglionby Ross (1780–1850), headmaster

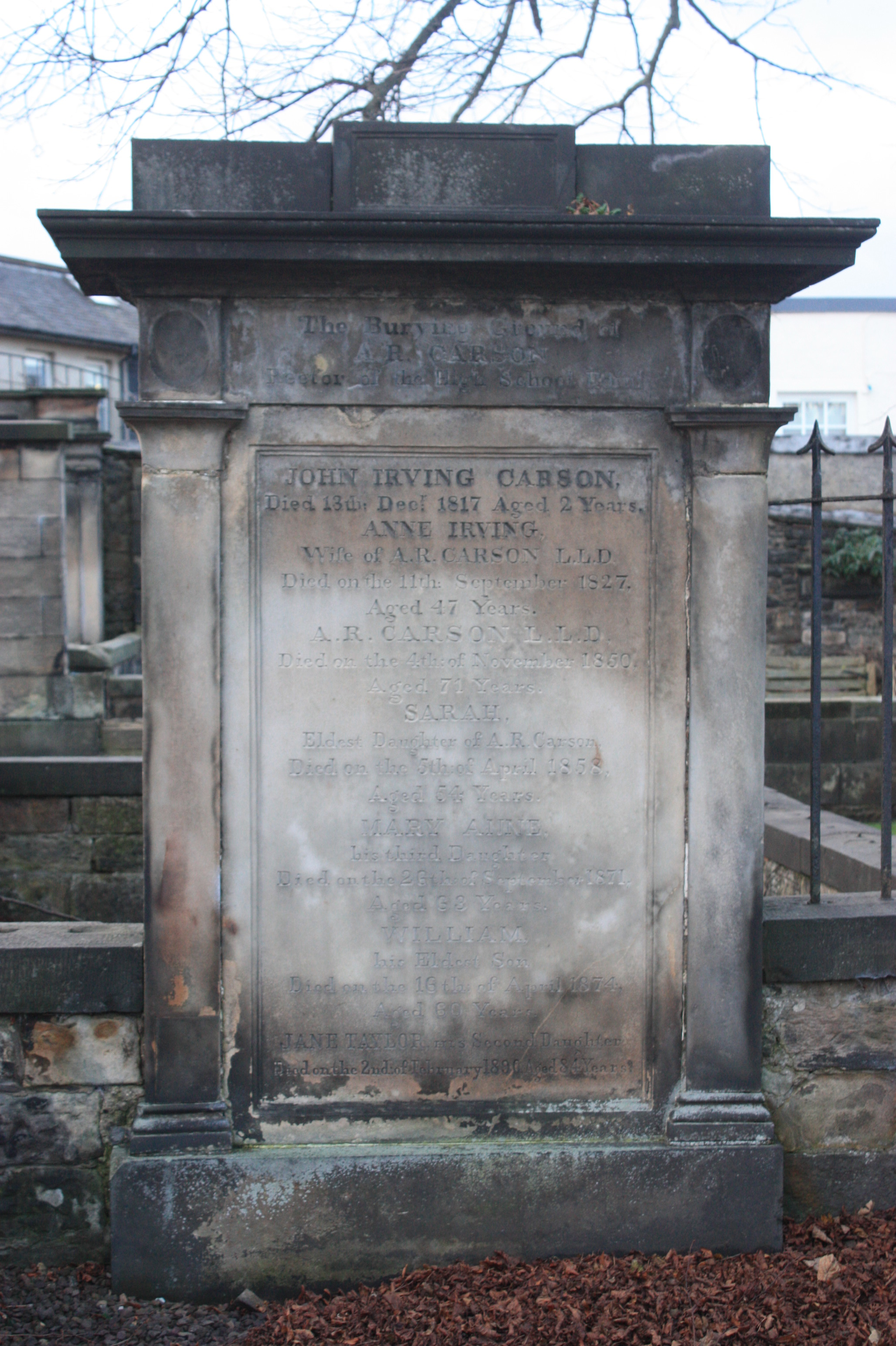
The grave of A R Carson, Greyfriars Kirkyard

Aglionby Ross Carson FRSE LLD (1780 – 4 November 1850) was a Scottish educationalist and author. He served as rector of the High School in Edinburgh from 1820 to 1845. His Latin texts remain in use. In texts he is usually referred to as A. R. Carson.

== Life ==
He was born in Hollywood in Dumfriesshire and his early life was spent in Closeburn. He was educated at Wallace Hall then sent to Edinburgh to study, first at the Edinburgh High School then at the University of Edinburgh, studying classics.

From 1801 to 1806 he served as rector of Dumfries Grammar School. He then returned to Edinburgh High School to teach Classics, until 1820, when he was promoted to rector, in charge of the school. He was a contributor to the Scottish Review and Encyclopædia Britannica.

He was elected a Fellow of the Royal Society of Edinburgh in 1821 and in 1826 the University of St Andrews awarded him an honorary doctorate (LL.D).

In the 1830s he is listed at 82 Lauriston Place in Edinburgh, just west of Greyfriars Kirkyard.

He resigned as rector of the high school in 1845. He died in Edinburgh on 4 November 1850 and is buried in Greyfriars Kirkyard with his wife Anne Irving and four of their children. The grave lies towards the north end of the western extension.

A memorial to Carson was later erected in St Giles Cathedral in Edinburgh.

== Publications ==
- The Relative Qui, Quae, Quad
- Exercises in Attic Greek
- Translations of Tacitus and Phaedrus

== Artistic recognition ==
His portrait, by Sir John Watson Gordon, is held by the Royal High School, Edinburgh.

== Family ==
His granddaughter, Mary Carson, married the anatomist David Hepburn.
