= Aging Cell =

- Discipline: Aging, physiology
- Language: English
- Edited by: Monty Montano

Publication details
- History: 2002–present
- Publisher: John Wiley & Sons on behalf of the Anatomical Society
- Frequency: Monthly
- Open access: Yes
- License: CC BY
- Impact factor: 7.7 (2025)

Standard abbreviations
- ISO 4: Aging Cell

Indexing
- CODEN: ACGECQ
- ISSN: 1474-9718 (print); 1474-9726 (web)
- LCCN: 2002214719
- OCLC no.: 858831272

Links
- Journal homepage; Online access; Online archive; Journal page at society website

Aging Cell is a peer-reviewed open access scientific journal and an official journal of the Anatomical Society. It is published on their behalf by John Wiley & Sons. It was established in 2002. Its editor-in-chief is Monty Montano (Boston OAIC). The journal covers research on all aspects of aging, publishing research articles, reviews, minireviews, and commentaries.

In August 2022, its four editors-in-chief resigned, alleging excessive workload and insufficient compensation. At the time, Retraction Watch said the journal was "regarded as the leader in its field".

== Abstracting and indexing ==
The journal is abstracted and indexed in:

- Chemical Abstracts Service
- CSA Biological Sciences Database
- Dietary Supplements
- EBSCO databases
- Embase
- Index Medicus/MEDLINE/PubMed
- InfoTrac
- Neurosciences Abstracts
- ProQuest databases
- Science Citation Index Expanded

According to the Journal Citation Reports, the journal has a 2025 impact factor of 7.7.
