= David Hepburn =

Scottish physician and anatomist

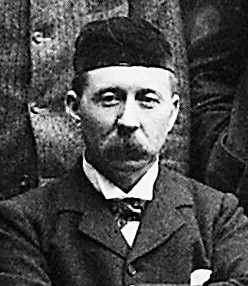
David Hepburn

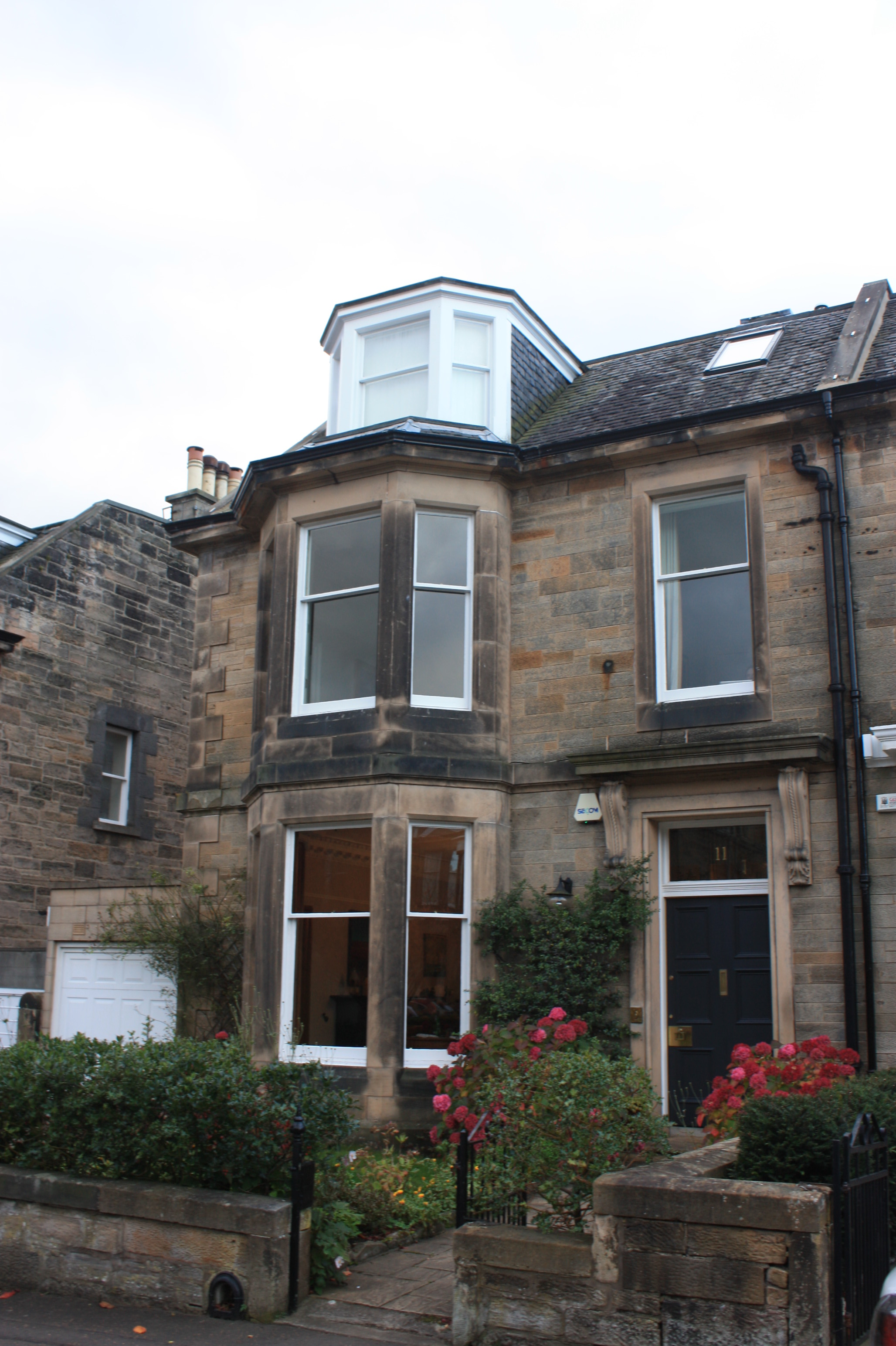
11 Glenorchy Terrace, Edinburgh

David Hepburn CMG FRSE (1859-1931) was a Scottish physician and anatomist. He served as president of the Anatomical Society 1916 to 1918.

== Life ==
He was born in Milnathort on 30 October 1858, the son of John Hepburn, a local vet, and Elizabeth Dunn. He attended Brand's School in the town. He studied anatomy at the University of Edinburgh (possibly intending to be a vet like his father, as the courses were parallel) but moved specifically to human anatomy and medicine, graduating around 1880. In 1885 he became a Senior Demonstrator in the Professor William Turner's anatomy class: dissecting bodies while Turner spoke, a standard methodology for the time.

In 1890 he was elected a Fellow of the Royal Society of Edinburgh. His proposers were Andrew Douglas Maclagan, Sir William Turner, Alexander Crum Brown and John Chiene.

He continued as Senior Demonstrator at the University of Edinburgh until 1903 when he received his own professorship at the University of Cardiff. His final years in Edinburgh were spent at 11 Glenorchy Terrace in the south side of the city.

During the First World War he was Surgeon-Colonel with the 3rd Western General Hospital in Cardiff.

He died on 9 March 1931.

== Family ==
He was married to Mary Carson, granddaughter of Aglionby Ross Carson.
