= John Cunningham (moderator) =

Scottish minister

John Cunningham (1819–1893) was a Scottish minister who served as Moderator of the General Assembly of the Church of Scotland in 1886.

He was instrumental in broadening appointments within the Church of Scotland to other Presbyterian bodies. He was also the main mover in introducing organs into Scottish churches, which had previously sung a cappella.

== Life ==
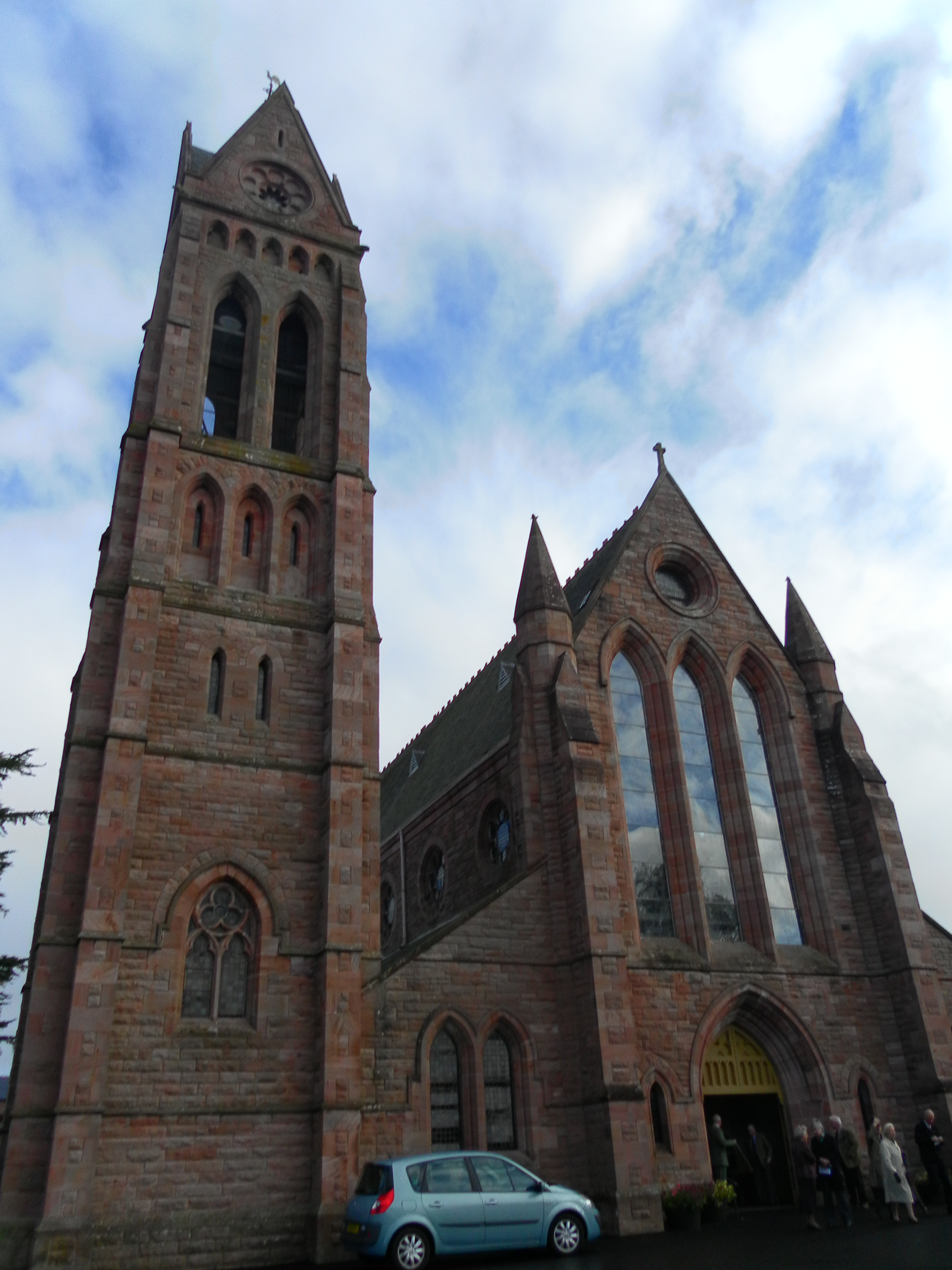
Crieff Parish Church

He was born in Paisley on 9 May 1819, the son of Daniel Cunningham, an ironmonger, living and working at 53 High Street.

He was educated at Paisley Grammar School then studied divinity at both Glasgow University and Edinburgh University. At the latter he won Prof Wilson's prize for poetry with his poem "The Hearth and the Altar". He was licensed to preach by the Presbytery of the Church of Scotland in Paisley in 1845. He worked briefly in Lanark then was ordained at Crieff in August 1845. He served as minister of Crieff Parish Church for 41 years.

In 1860 Edinburgh University awarded him an honorary doctorate (DD). In 1867 he came to fame whilst still at Crieff in a court case known as the "Crieff Organ Case", where he won the right to install an organ in his church. The court case caused a wave of church organs to be installed across Scotland.

In 1886 he succeeded Very Rev Alexander Ferrier Mitchell as Moderator of the General Assembly of the Church of Scotland. He was elected Principal of St Mary's College, St Andrews in the same year (replacing John Tulloch) and also awarded a further doctorate (LLD) from Glasgow University. In 1887 he got a third doctorate (LLD) from Trinity College, Dublin.

He died in St Andrews on 1 September 1893.

== Family ==
In December 1846 he married Susan Porteous Murray (d.1902) only daughter of Crieff banker, William Porteous and Susan Porteous. They had at least seven children.

They had a daughter, Susan Porteous Cunningham (1852–1913). She married Rev Robert Davidson, minister of St Cyrus.

They were parents to the anatomist Daniel John Cunningham.

== Publications ==
- Popery and Scotch Episcopacy Compared (1849)
- Church History of Scotland 2 vols (1859) (second edition 1882)
- The Quakers: An International History (1868) (second edition 1897)
- New Theory of Knowing and Known (1874)
- Home Spun Religion (1880)
- The Religion of Love (1880)
