= Simon Parson =

British anatomist

Simon Henry Parson (born 23 May 1966) is a British anatomist. He is Regius Professor of Anatomy at the University of Aberdeen.

Parson was educated at Durham University (BSc Zoology, 1987) and the University of Edinburgh (PhD Neuroscience, 1990). He was the President of the Anatomical Society.
