= Anatomical Society =

The Anatomical Society (AS), previously known as the Anatomical Society of Great Britain and Ireland or ASGBI was founded in London in 1887 to "promote, develop and advance research and education in all aspects of anatomical science".

The society organises scientific meetings, publishes the Journal of Anatomy and Aging Cell and makes annual awards of PhD studentships, grants and prizes.

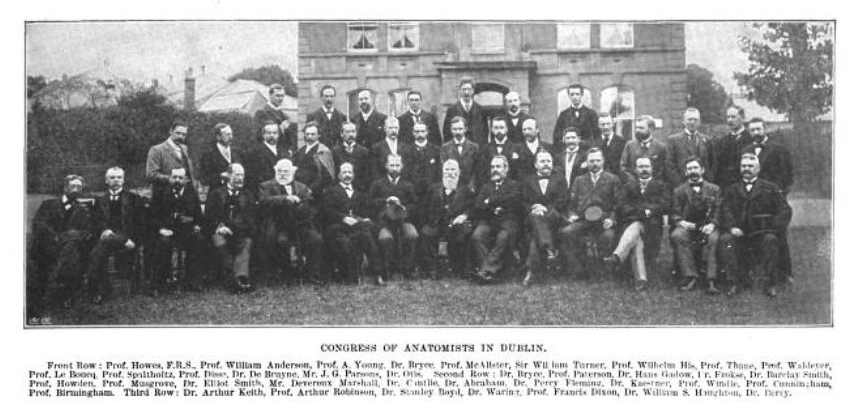
Congress of the society in 1897

The society was suggested in early 1887 by Charles Barrett Lockwood, a surgeon and anatomist at St Bartholomew's Hospital, London and the first meeting was held on 6 May 1887. Lockwood was elected as Secretary and Sir George Murray Humphry, Professor of Anatomy and the first Professor of Surgery at Cambridge University, as first President of the society. Two resolutions were adopted: "That an Anatomical Society be founded, and that it be called the Anatomical Society of Great Britain and Ireland" and "That the scope and object of the Society be the Anatomy, Embryology and Histology of Man and of Animals in so far as they throw light upon the structure of Man."

In 2010 the name of the society was changed to "The Anatomical Society"

== Coat of arms ==
Coat of arms of the Anatomical Society
Notes The Anatomical Society was granted armorial bearings by the College of Arms on 1 October 2014, which consist of: Crest A demi Lion Or holding with the dexter paw a Rod of Aesculapius Sable the serpent Gules and resting the sinister paw on a Human Skull Argent Escutcheon Sable fretty Argent and Bezanty on each Bezant a Roundel Gules over all a Chevron Argent Supporters On the dexter a male Écorché and on the sinister a naked Caucasian Woman proper crined Or Motto "Ex conformatione usus" (Latin for "From structure comes function" Badge A Lion rampant Or holding with the forepaws a Rod of Aesculapius Sable the serpent Gules and resting the dexter hindpaw on a Human Skull Argent Symbolism "The design alludes to the professions of members of the Anatomical Society who comprise medical practitioners, dentists, vets, scientists and artists. The frets in the Arms represent neural cells and the roundels within them, stem cells (for the scientists). A chevron is one of a series of bones on the ventral side of the tail in many reptiles and some mammals. The lion, the king of beasts (for the vets), in the Crest and in the Badge supports a Rod of Aesculapius (for the medical practitioners) and rests its paw on a skull (with teeth for the dentists). The Supporters are a male écorché and a female nude (for the artists)."

== Presidents ==
The presidents of the Anatomical Society:

- 2023-present Tracey Wilkinson
- 2019-2023 Simon Parson
- 2016-2019 Stefan Przyborski
- 2013–2016 T. Clive Lee
- 2011–2013 D. Ceri Davies
- 2008–2010 Susan Standring
- 2005–2007 John Patrick Fraher
- 2003–2005 Bernard John Moxham
- 2001–2003 Alan Boyde
- 1999–2001 John Frederick Morris
- 1997–1999 John Anthony Firth
- 1995–1997 Bernard Anthony Wood
- 1993–1995 Rayner Walter Guillery
- 1991–1993 David Brymor Thomas
- 1989–1991 John Williams Simmons Harriss
- 1988–1989 Edward John Clegg
- 1986–1988 Jeffrey Darcy Lever
- 1983–1986 Anthony Stuart King
- 1981–1983 Robert Barer
- 1979–1981 Tony William Alphonse Glenister
- 1977–1979 Sir Richard John Harrison
- 1975–1977 Rex Ernest Coupland
- 1973–1975 Alexander Graham McDonnell Weddell
- 1971–1973 Raymond John Scothorne
- 1969–1971 Ruth Elizabeth Mary Bowden
- 1967–1969 John Joseph Pritchard
- 1965–1967 David Vaughan Davis
- 1963–1965 Eldred Wright Walls
- 1961–1963 George Archibald Grant Mitchell
- 1959–1961 John Dixon Boyd
- 1957–1959 Frank Goldby
- 1955–1957 Robert Douglas Lockhart
- 1953–1955 William James Hamilton
- 1951–1953 Sir Wilfrid Le Gros Clark
- 1949–1951 Mary Lucas Keene
- 1947–1949 Arthur Beeny Appleton
- 1945–1947 James Couper Brash
- 1943–1945 Frederic Wood Jones
- 1941–1943 Wynfrid Lawrence Henry Duckworth
- 1939–1941 James Peter Hill
- 1937–1939 Alexander Low
- 1935–1937 John Ernest Sullivan Frazer
- 1933–1935 Andrew Francis Dixon
- 1931–1933 William Wright
- 1929–1931 Thomas Hastie Bryce
- 1927–1929 Edward Fawcett
- 1924–1927 Sir Grafton Elliot Smith
- 1922–1924 James Thomas Wilson
- 1920–1922 Arthur Robinson
- 1918–1920 Sir Arthur Keith
- 1916–1918 David Hepburn
- 1914–1916 Robert Howden
- 1912–1914 Frederick Gymer Parsons
- 1910–1912 Robert William Reid
- 1908–1910 Andrew Melville Paterson
- 1906–1908 Arthur Thomson
- 1903–1906 Johnson Symington
- 1901–1903 Charles Barrett Lockwood
- 1899–1901 Alfred Harry Young
- 1897–1899 Alexander Macalister
- 1895–1897 Sir George Dancer Thane
- 1893–1895 Daniel John Cunningham
- 1890–1893 Sir William Turner
- 1887–1890 Sir George Murray Humphry (first President)
