= James Bell Pettigrew =

Scottish anatomist

James Bell Pettigrew FRS FRSE FRCPE
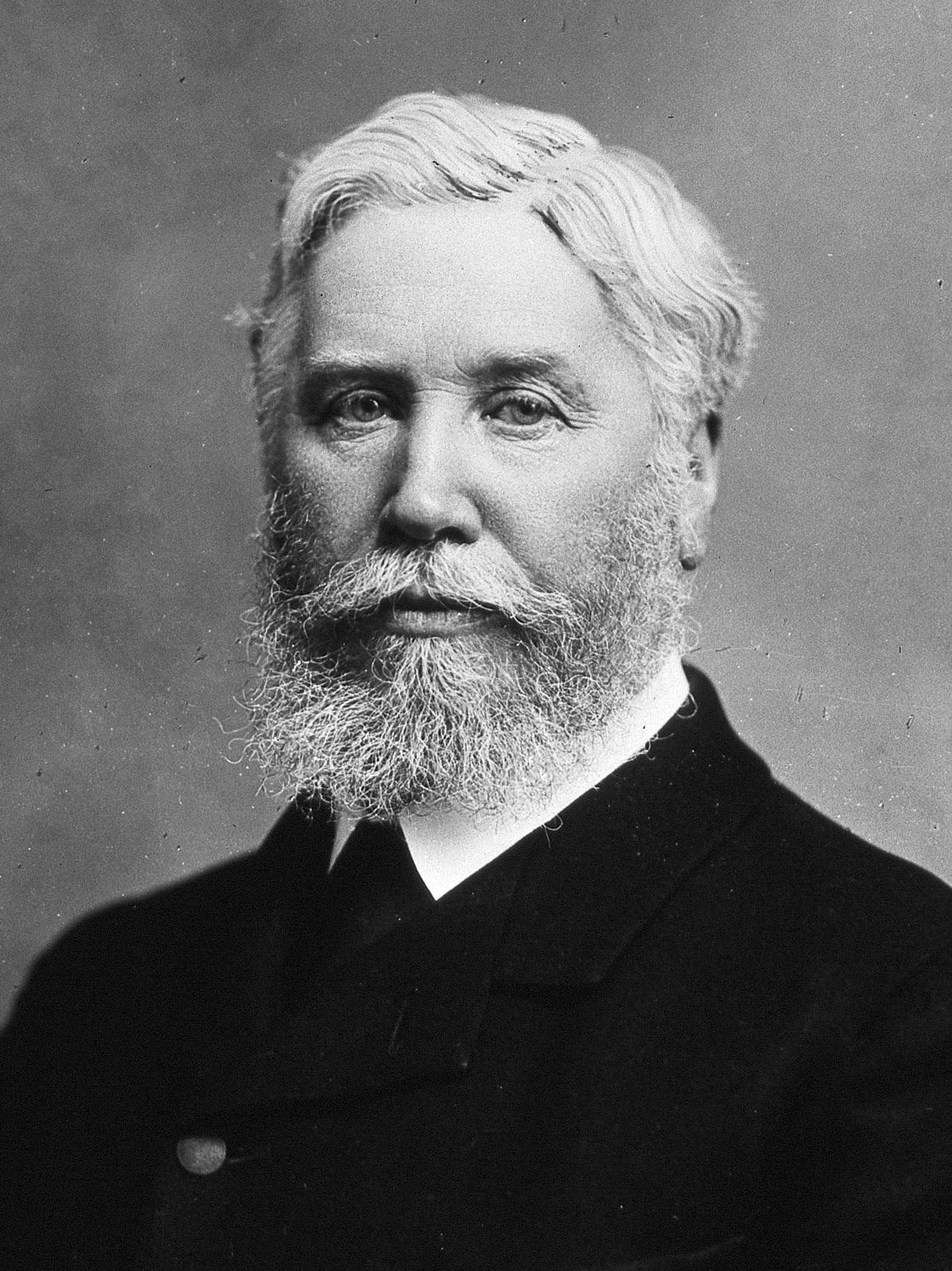
- Born: 26 May 1834; Roxhill, Calderbank, Lanarkshire
- Died: 30 January 1908 (aged 73)
- Citizenship: United Kingdom
- Education: University of Glasgow; University of Edinburgh
- Medical career
- Institutions: Royal Infirmary of Edinburgh; Hunterian Museum; Royal College of Surgeons of Edinburgh; University of St Andrews
- Research: Anatomy; Pathology
- Notable works: Design in Nature; Animal Locomotion: or Walking, Swimming and Flying
- Awards: Croonian Lectures

James Bell Pettigrew FRSE FRS FRCPE LLD (26 May 1834 – 30 January 1908) was a Scottish anatomist and noted naturalist, aviation pioneer and museum curator. He was a distinguished naturalist in Britain, and Professor of Anatomy at St Andrews University from 1875 until his death.

Pettigrew was an internationally acknowledged authority on animal locomotion and bird flight, which informed his invention of an early flying machine. The Wright Brothers studied his most popular work, Animal Locomotion: or Walking, Swimming and Flying which was published in 1873.

== Early life and education ==
Pettigrew was born at Roxhill, near Calderbank in Lanarkshire, the son of Robert Pettigrew and his wife, Mary Bell. He was educated at the Free West Academy in Airdrie. He then entered the Faculty of Arts at the University of Glasgow where he studied Latin, Greek, Logic, Mathematics and Physics. As was common at the time he did not graduate. Moving to Edinburgh he attended the anatomy lectures of John Struthers at the Edinburgh Extramural School of Medicine which convinced him to study medicine. As a medical student at the University of Edinburgh his teachers included what he later described as 'a galaxy of genius and talent’. These included James Syme (surgery), John Hughes Bennett (physiology), James Young Simpson (Midwifery) and John Goodsir (Anatomy). Pettigrew flourished under the tutelage of John Goodsir with whom he developed a programme of research into the morphology of the human heart. During this project he prepared 112 dissections of cardiac muscle recording these by meticulous drawings and photographs. For this work he was awarded the anatomy gold medal. The London physiologist William Sharpey and Allen Thomson were so impressed with this work that they invited Pettigrew to deliver the Croonian Lectures of the Royal Society and the Royal College of Physicians of London in 1860.This was a rare distinction for an undergraduate. In these lectures, Pettigrew advanced a remarkable discussion of the anatomical arrangement of the musculature of the heart. In 1861 he graduated MD from Edinburgh with the Gold Medal for his year and became House Surgeon to James Syme at the Royal Infirmary of Edinburgh. From an early age, Pettigrew demonstrated a remarkable flair for morphological analysis and an analytical grasp of natural history.

== Career ==
In 1862, Pettigrew accepted the post of Assistant Curator at the Hunterian Museum of the Royal College of Surgeons in London. Here he contributed some 600 dissections, mostly of cardiac muscle, the urinary bladder and the prostate. He held the position for five years. During this time he started to collect evidence that led to his pioneering theories of flight. In 1867 he gave lectures to the Linnean Society on the nature of the mechanical appliances necessary to make flight possible. He showed that the figure-of-8 movements of wings in the animal kingdom were identical to those made by wings in flight. In 1867 he became unwell suffering from 'a condition of the retina'. He took a break in Ireland to continue to study the flight of birds and bats. In 1870 he published his theory of flight in which he demonstrated that: insects, bats, and birds fly by figure-of-eight movements; that the wing of the insect, bat and bird, are screws structurally like the blade of a screw propeller; that wings have a reciprocating action and that wings describe a figure-of-eight track. He had a passionate interest in animal locomotion and, more particularly, in the theory of flight, and around the turn of the century made several prototypes of an ornithopter of his own design.

In 1868, at the age of 36, Pettigrew was elected a Fellow of the Royal Society.

In 1869 he returned to Scotland to take up an honorary position as Curator of the museum of the Royal College of Surgeons of Edinburgh and employment as pathologist to the Edinburgh Royal Infirmary. In 1872 Pettigrew was elected a member of the Harveian Society of Edinburgh and served as president in 1889. In 1873 he was elected a Fellow of the Royal Society of Edinburgh his proposer being Sir Thomas Richard Fraser and later that year was elected a Fellow of the Royal College of Physicians of Edinburgh. In March 1873 he became a lecturer in Physiology at the Edinburgh Extramural School of Medicine.

In 1873, Pettigrew published Animal Locomotion: or Walking, Swimming and Flying, his most popular work. In 1875, he was appointed to the Chandos Chair of Medicine and Anatomy at St Andrews University and established a home on The Scores which he called Swallowgate because of its situation which allowed him to observe birds in flight. Over several subsequent years, Pettigrew assembled his magnum opus Design in Nature, published in three volumes and lavishly illustrated with engravings and photographs. Its publication was completed in 1908.
In this work, he showed some indifference to Darwinism and mainstream evolutionary biology, favouring teleological points of view instead. His reputation was subsequently overshadowed by that of his colleague D'Arcy Wentworth Thompson.

Pettigrew lived at 4 Randolph Place in Edinburgh's West End.

He died at his home in St Andrews in 1908. Pettigrew's grave is in the Eastern Cemetery of St Andrews, linked to the southern wall of the grounds of St Andrews Cathedral. His widow and her second husband, Professor James Musgrove, were later buried beside him.

== Family ==
In 1890 he married Elsie Gray. They had no children. She remarried after he died to his colleague James Musgrove.

== Gallery ==
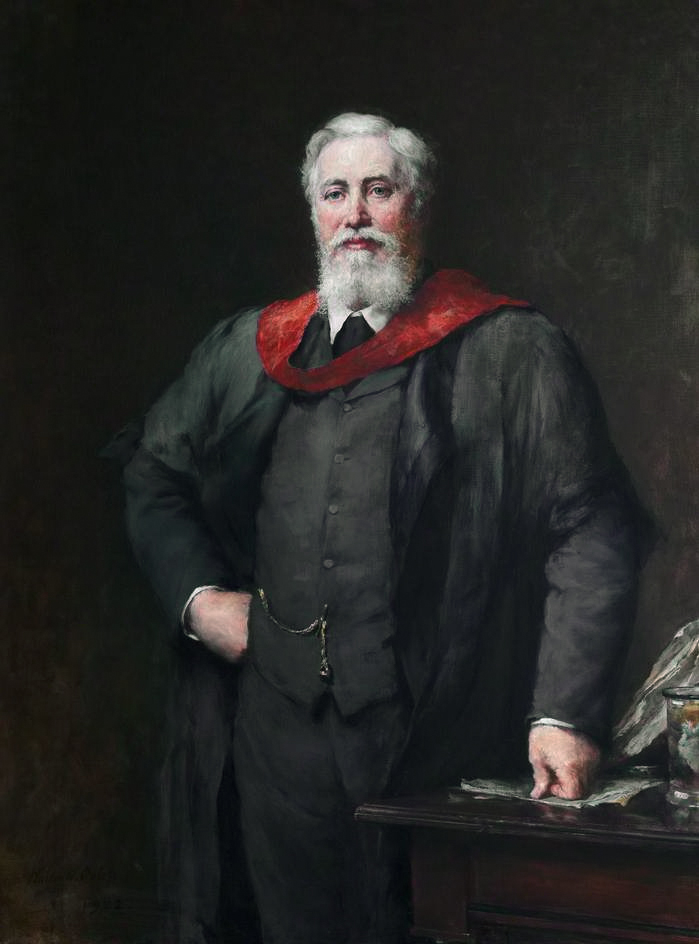
James Bell Pettigrew, by Walter William Ouless, oil on canvas 137 x 102.5 cm, 1902

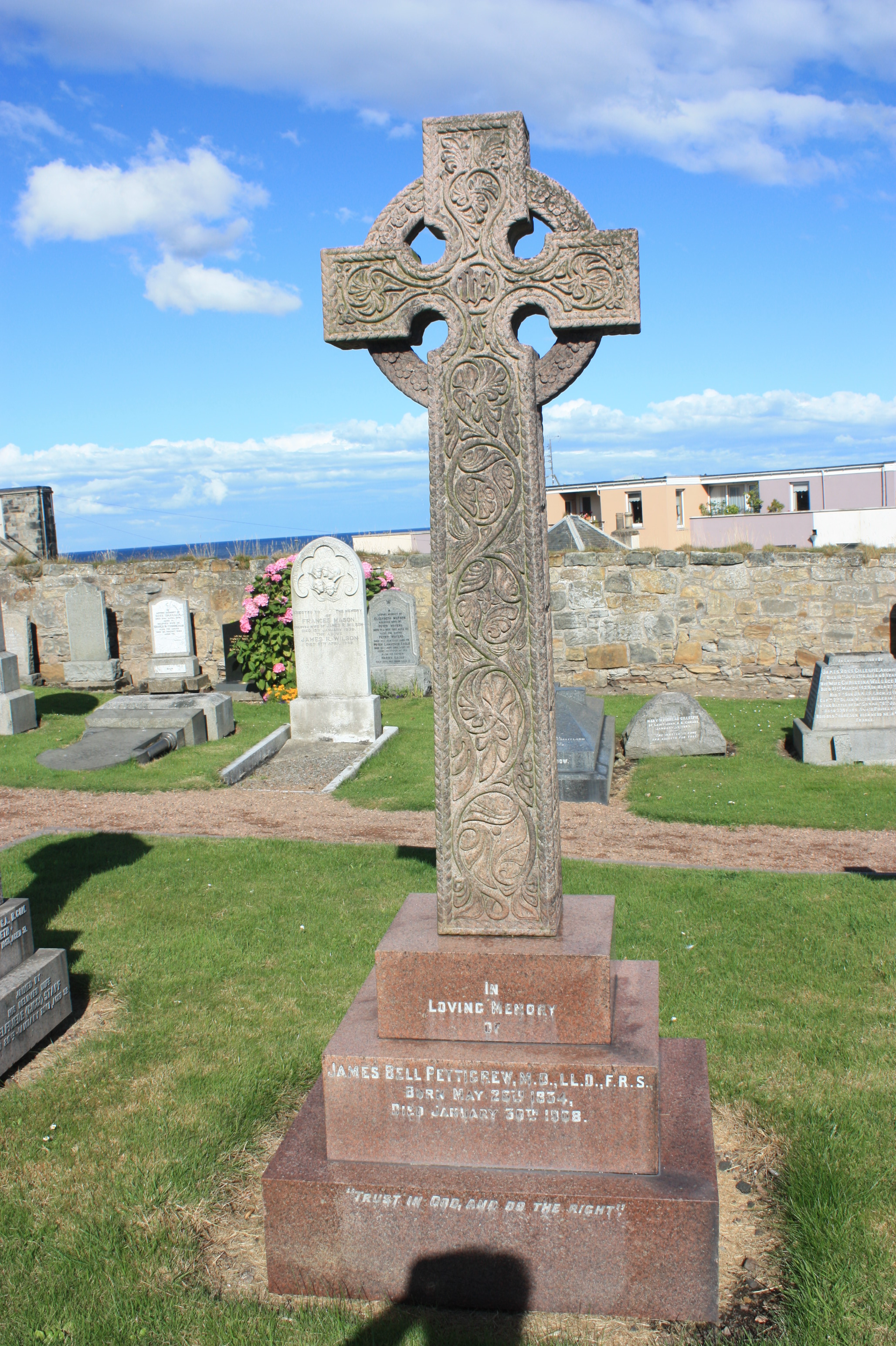
The grave of James Bell Pettigrew, Eastern Cemetery, St Andrews

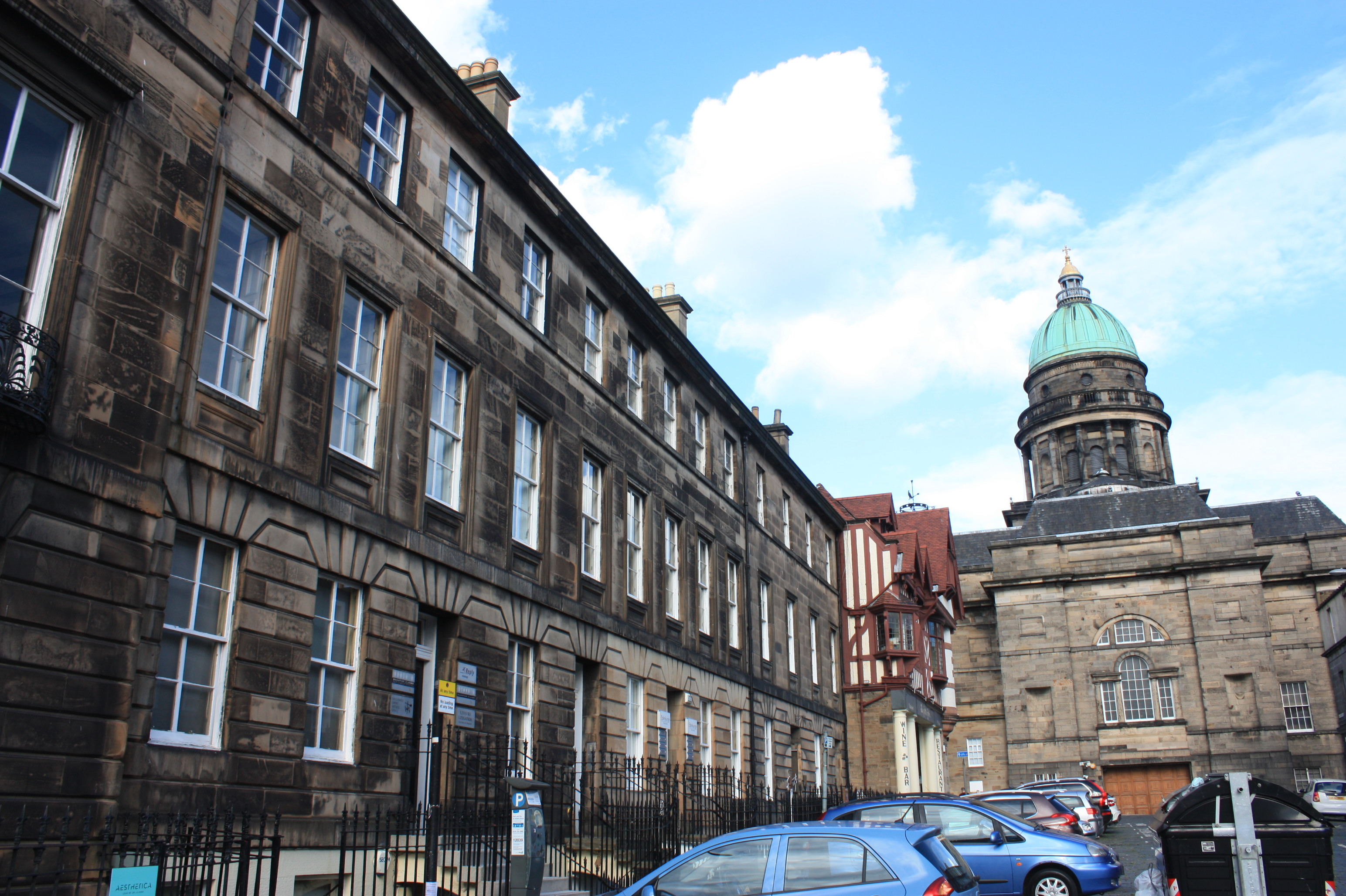
Randolph Place, Edinburgh
