= Daniel John Cunningham =

British physician, zoologist and anatomist

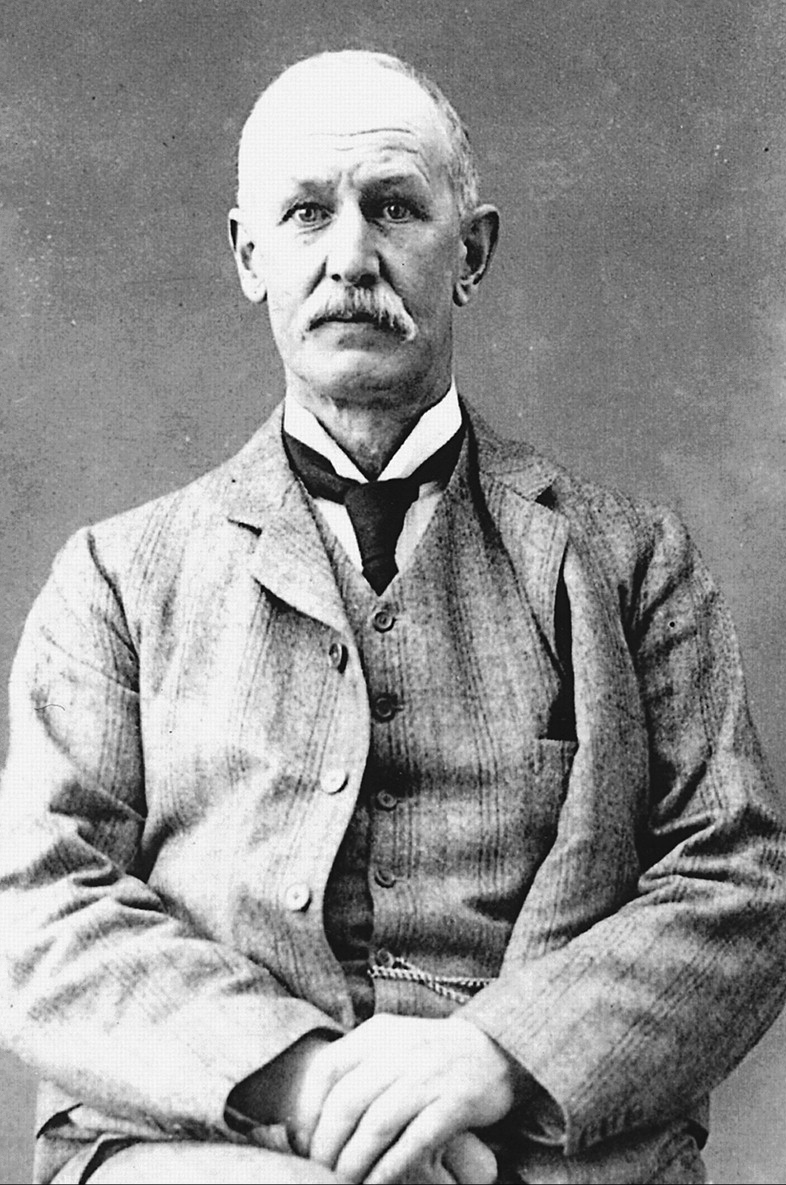
Daniel John Cunningham

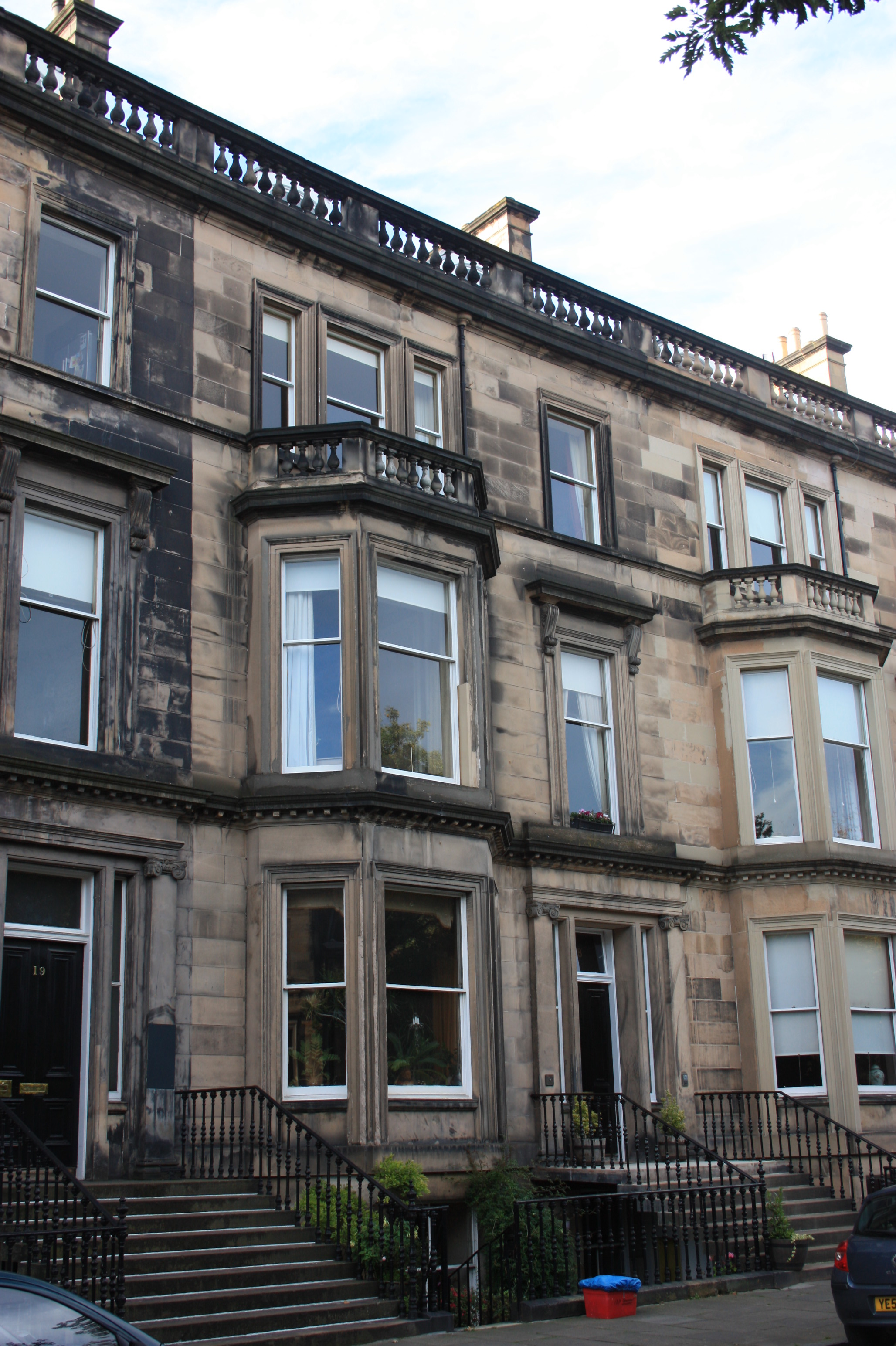
18 Grosvenor Crescent, Edinburgh

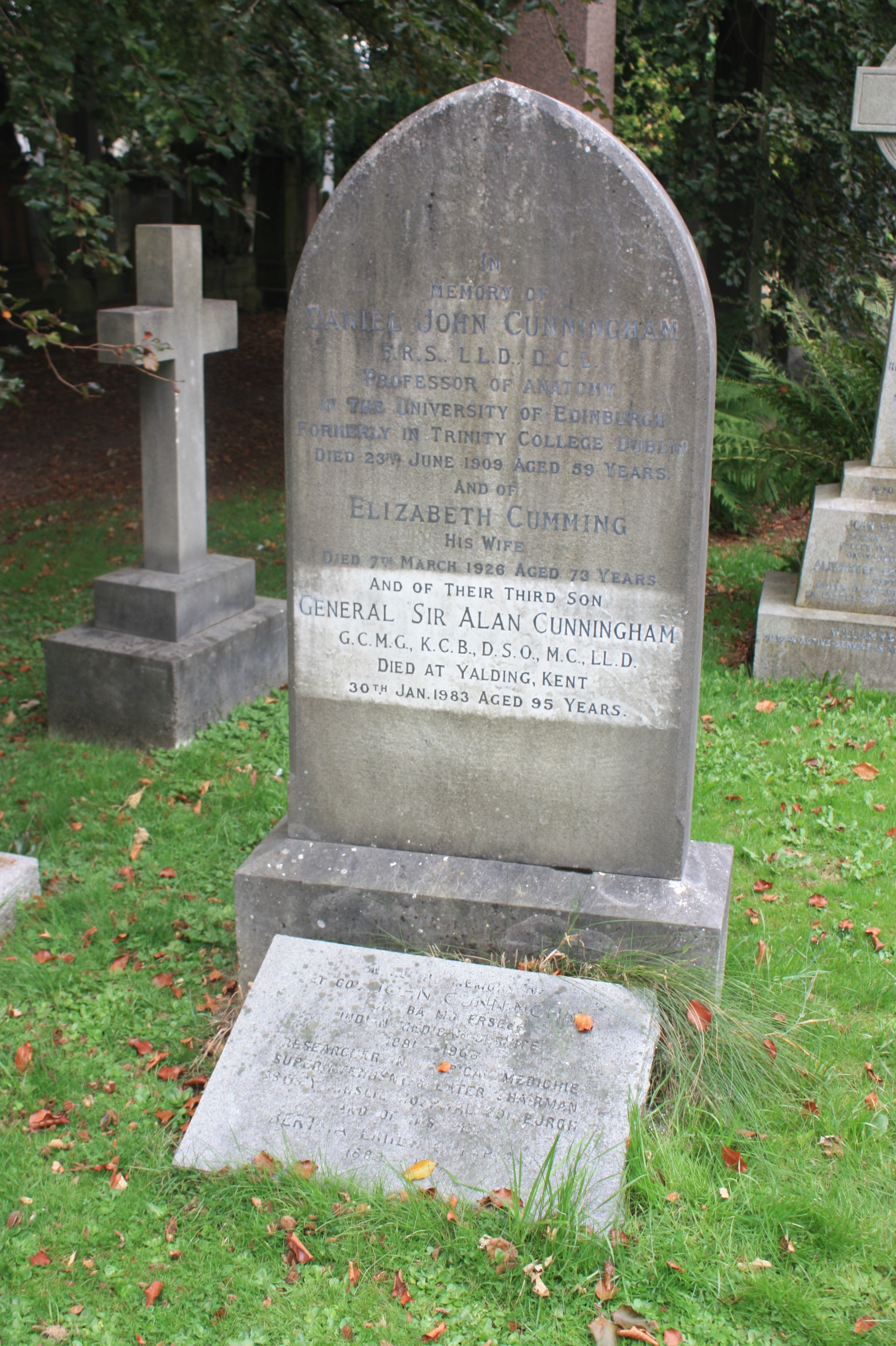
Cunningham grave, Dean Cemetery

Daniel John Cunningham, FRS, FRSE, FRAI (15 April 1850 – 23 July 1909) was a Scottish physician, zoologist, and anatomist, famous for Cunningham's Text-book of Anatomy and Cunningham's Manual of Practical Anatomy.

== Biography ==
Cunningham was born in the manse at Crieff, the son of the Very Rev John Cunningham (1819–1893) and of his wife Susan Porteous Murray. His father became Moderator of the General Assembly in 1886.

Following education at Crieff Academy he studied medicine at the University of Edinburgh, where he qualified as Bachelor of Medicine and Master of Surgery (M.B. C.M.) with first-class honours in 1874 and attained his M.D. in 1876, receiving a gold medal for his thesis. From 1876 until 1882 he acted as a demonstrator for his professor at the university. After one year as Professor of Anatomy at the Royal College of Surgeons of Ireland (in Dublin) he moved to the chair of Anatomy at Trinity College, Dublin, which he held from 1883 to 1903. On the appointment of Sir William Turner to the post of Principal and Vice-Chancellor at the University of Edinburgh he was invited to succeed him as Professor of Anatomy and he held that post from 1903 until his death. His Text-book of Anatomy, first published in 1902, went through 15 editions under various editors: the first three editions were prepared under Cunningham's editorship.

He was at various times president of the Royal Zoological Society of Ireland, secretary and vice-president of the Royal Dublin Society and president of the Anatomical Society (1893–95). Cunningham was also editor of the Journal of Anatomy between 1900 and 1907. He was elected a fellow of the Royal College of Surgeons of Ireland, the Royal College of Surgeons of Edinburgh, the Royal Society (1891) and the Royal Society of Edinburgh.

In 1878 he was elected a fellow of the Royal Society of Edinburgh. His proposers were Sir William Turner, John Hutton Balfour, Alexander Crum Brown, and James Bryce. In 1887 he was elected a member of the Harveian Society of Edinburgh and in 1904 he was elected a member of the Aesculapian Club.

He died unexpectedly at home, 18 Grosvenor Crescent in Edinburgh's West End, on 23 July 1909 and was buried with his wife, Elizabeth, and children near the eastern side of Dean Cemetery in Edinburgh, close to the Dean Gallery entrance.

His position as professor of anatomy was filled by Arthur Robinson.

== Family ==
In 1878, he married Elizabeth Cumming Browne, eldest daughter of Rev Andrew Browne, minister of the parish of Beith in Ayrshire, and had by her three sons and two daughters. His eldest son Lt Col John Cunningham MD FRSE (1882–1968) was a physician and bacteriologist in the Indian Medical Service. His two younger sons were Admiral of the Fleet Andrew Cunningham, 1st Viscount Cunningham of Hyndhope, and General Sir Alan Cunningham, both decorated veterans of World War II. Cunningham's daughter Elizabeth Cumming Cunningham married Dr Edwin Bramwell FRSE (1873–1952), a prominent neurologist and son of Byrom Bramwell.

== Publications ==
- Manual of Practical Anatomy
- Textbook of Anatomy
- Report on the Anatomy of the Marsupials, H.M.S. Challenger Reports, Part XVI
- The Lumbar Curve in Man & Apes: Cunningham Memoir No.2, (1886) Royal Irish Academy.
- The Spinal Nervous System of the Porpoise & Dolphin (1876) J Anat Physiol.
