= Journal of Anatomy =

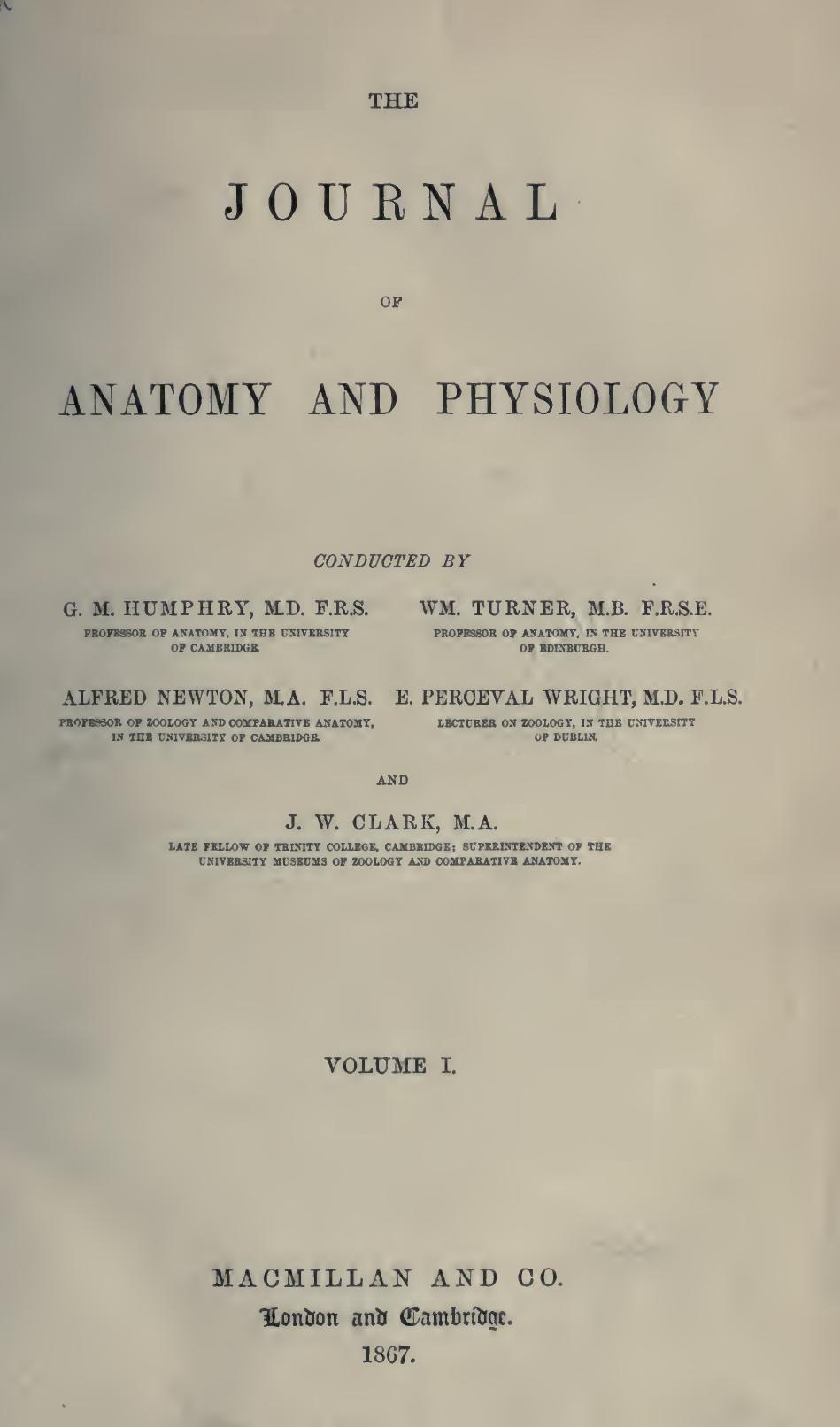
- Discipline: Anatomy, morphology
- Language: English
- Edited by: Philip Cox, James N. Sleigh, Neil Vargesson, Evie E. Vereecke

Publication details
- Former name(s): Journal of Anatomy and Physiology
- History: 1867–present
- Publisher: Wiley
- Frequency: Monthly
- Impact factor: 2.4 (2022)

Standard abbreviations
- ISO 4: J. Anat.

Indexing
- CODEN: JOANAY
- ISSN: 0021-8782 (print); 1469-7580 (web)
- LCCN: 75-649510
- OCLC no.: 1058083446

Links
- Journal homepage; Online access; Online archive

The Journal of Anatomy is a monthly peer-reviewed scientific journal published by Wiley on behalf of the Anatomical Society. It covers all aspects of anatomy and morphology. The journal was first published in 1867 and was originally known as the Journal of Anatomy and Physiology, obtaining its current title in October 1916. The editors-in-chief are Philip Cox (University College London), James N. Sleigh (University College London), Neil Vargesson (University of Aberdeen) and Evie E. Vereecke (KU Leuven).

According to the Journal Citation Reports, the journal has a 2022 impact factor of 2.4. In conjunction with their centennial in 2009, the international Special Libraries Association included the Journal of Anatomy as one of the 100 most influential journals in biology and medicine over the past 100 years.

== History ==
The journal was established in 1867 as the Journal of Anatomy and Physiology. The journal was conceived at the 1866 meeting of the British Association in Nottingham by founding editors George Murray Humphry (University of Cambridge), William Turner (University of Edinburgh), Alfred Newton (University of Cambridge), and Edward Perceval Wright (Trinity College Dublin). At the time of the journal's first publication, the subjects of anatomy and physiology were not regarded as separate entities and were both taught within anatomy departments. The journal was renamed Journal of Anatomy in 1916 (vol. 51), when it was adopted by the Anatomical Society, both in terms of management and ownership.

In a celebratory issue marking 150 years since its first publication, two commissioned reviews were published; one that provided a detailed historical overview of the journal and another that summarised the broader history of topographical anatomy over the last several thousand years.

=== Past editors ===
The following persons have been editor-in-chief:

- John Gray McKendrick
- Daniel John Cunningham
- Alexander Macalister
- Arthur Keith
- Herbert Henry Woollard
- Wilfred Le Gros Clark

== Best paper award ==
The "Journal of Anatomy Best Paper Prize" has been awarded annually by the Anatomical Society since 2008, with additional runner-up prizes since 2011.
