= William Turner (anatomist) =

English anatomist

Sir William Turner KCB FRS FRSE
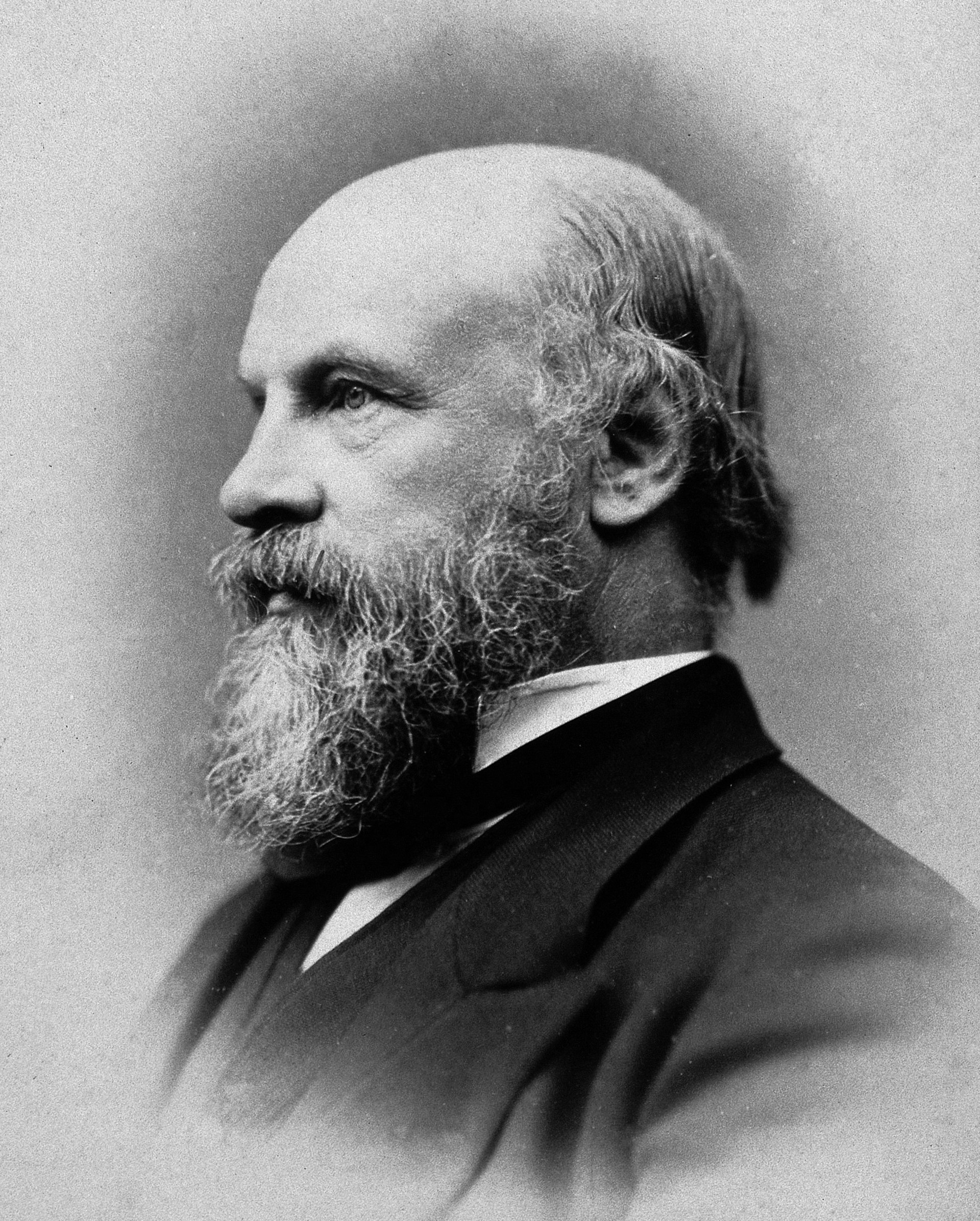
- Turner in 1881
- Born: 7 January 1832
- Died: 15 February 1916 (aged 84)
- Burial place: Dean Cemetery
- Citizenship: The United Kingdom of Great Britain and Ireland
- Spouse: Agnes Logan
- Children: Arthur Logan Turner

Academic background
- Education: University of London

Academic work
- Discipline: Anatomist
- Institutions: University of Edinburgh
- Notable works: Atlas of Human Anatomy and Physiology (1857); Comparative Anatomy of the Placenta (1876)

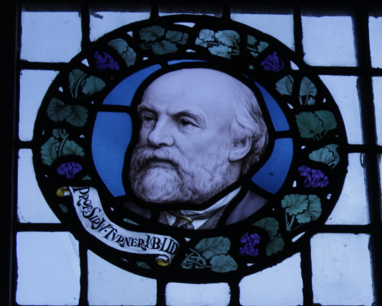
Memorial window to Prof Sir William Turner in Scottish National Portrait Gallery

Sir William Turner KCB FRS FRSE (7 January 1832, in Lancaster – 15 February 1916, in Edinburgh) was an English anatomist and was the Principal of the University of Edinburgh from 1903 to 1916.

== Life ==
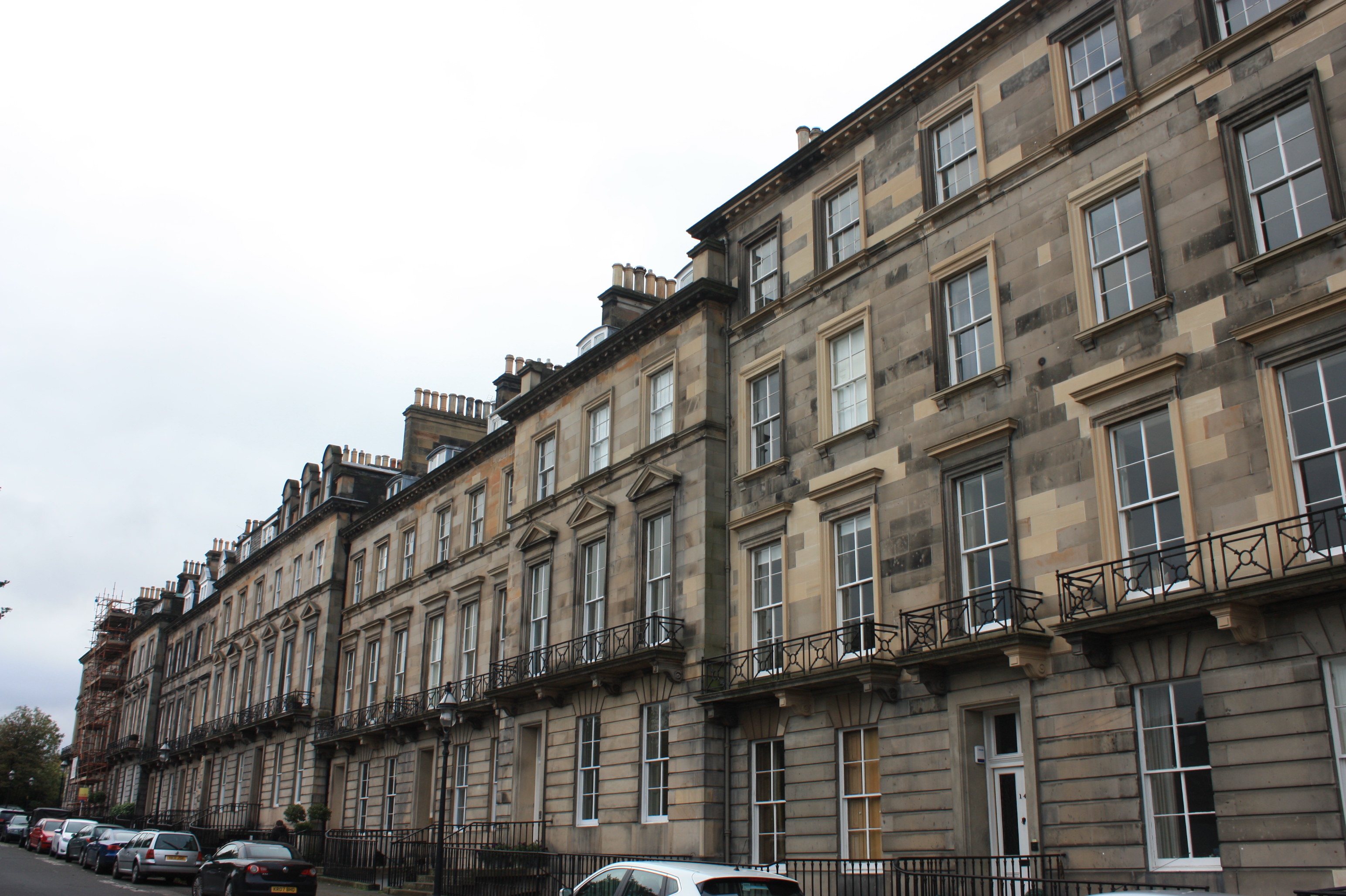
Eton Terrace, Edinburgh

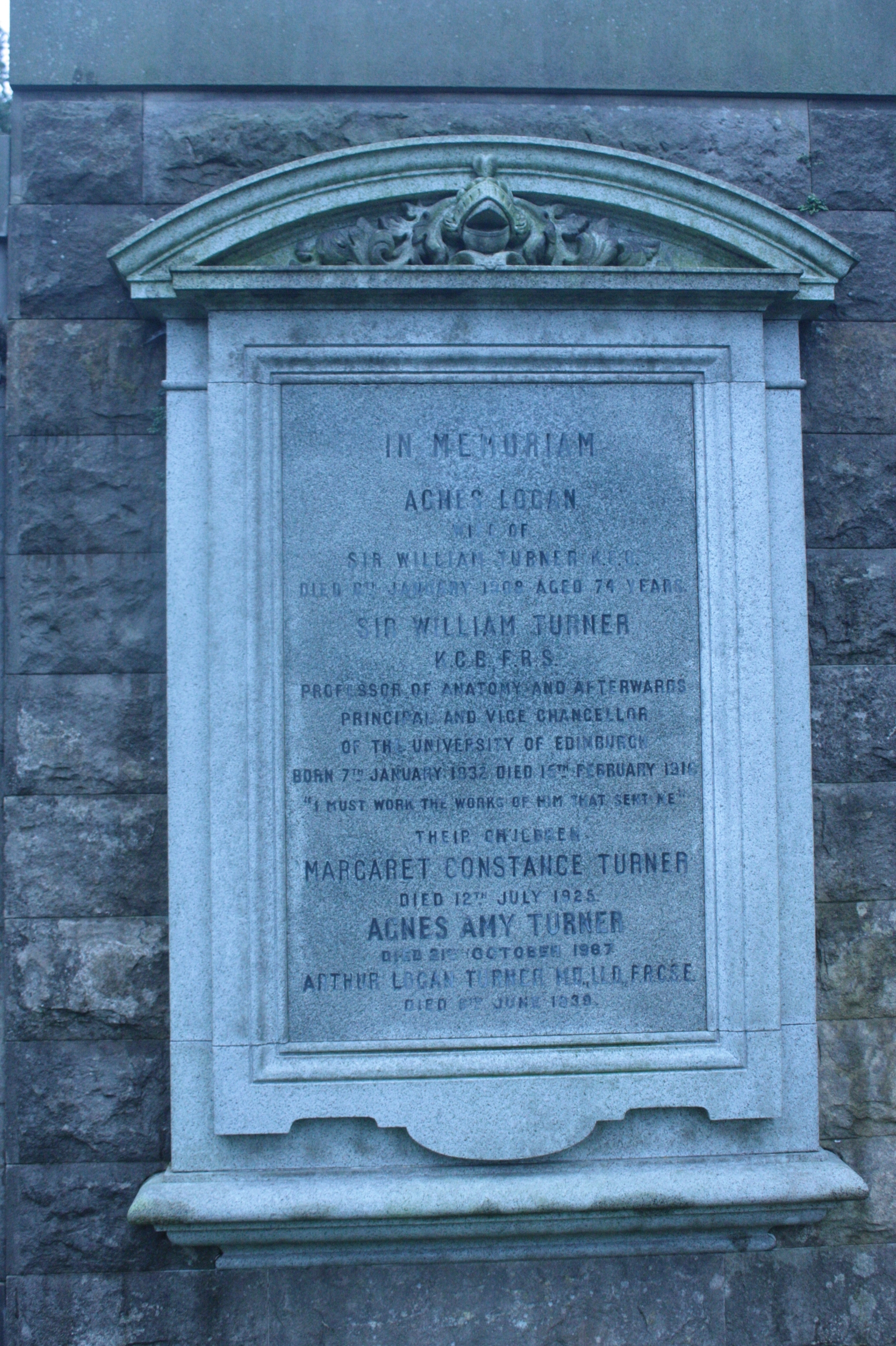
The grave of Sir William Turner, Dean Cemetery

Turner was born in Lancaster the son of William Turner a relatively rich cabinetmaker, and his wife, Margaret Aldren. He was educated at various private schools, and then apprenticed to a local physician, Dr Christopher Johnston.

He afterwards studied medicine at St. Bartholomew's hospital, and graduated M.B. from the University of London in 1857. In 1854 he became senior demonstrator in anatomy at the University of Edinburgh. He lived in rooms at Old College. Whilst in that post, he came to fame in 1857 with the publication of the nationally acclaimed "Atlas of Human Anatomy and Physiology", a remarkable work for someone aged only 25. John Goodsir, Professor of Anatomy at Edinburgh at that time, is acknowledged as superintending the illustrations to the associated Handbook.

In 1861 he was elected a Fellow of the Royal Society of Edinburgh, his proposer being John Goodsir. He served as the Society's Secretary from 1869 to 1891, twice as Vice President from 1891 to 1895 and from 1897 to 1903, and as President from 1908 to 1913. He won the society's Neill Prize for 1868 to 1871 and the Keith Prize for 1901–1903.

Turner was appointed Professor of Anatomy at the University of Edinburgh in 1867. Only at this point (despite being married) did he leave his rooms at Old College and move to a house. This was at 7 Brunswick Street north of Calton Hill. His assistant at this point was Morrison Watson who acted as his demonstrator.

In 1868 he was elected a member of the Aesculapian Club. In 1871 Turner was elected a member of the Harveian Society of Edinburgh and served as president in 1878, although was not able to attend that annual Festival of the Society. He was elected a Fellow of the Royal Society in 1877. His candidature citation read:

Member of the General Medical Council. – Formerly Examiner in Anatomy in the University of London, and Lecturer on Anatomy and Physiology at the Royal College of Surgeons of England. Author of a Memoir on the Placentation of the Lemurs in the Philosophical Transactions 1876; and of papers in the Proceedings of the Royal Society June 1854 June 1865 and December 1875 – Author of papers in the Transactions of the Royal Society of Edinburgh in 1860, 1865, 1870, 1871, 1872, 1873, 1875 and of numerous papers in the Proceedings of the Society. One of the founders and conductors of the Journal of Anatomy and Physiology and author of many papers in it. Eminent as an Anatomist and Physiologist."

Turner was best known as a brain surgeon, and published various valuable papers on the subject. He wrote An Introduction to Human Anatomy: Including the Anatomy of the Tissues and also developed a set of eight anatomical charts for use in an anatomy laboratory or classroom of a medical school. The charts illustrate bones, ligaments, muscles, heart and arteries, veins and lungs, organs of digestion, nervous system, and organs of sense and voice.

He was President of the Royal College of Surgeons of Edinburgh 1882–3.

Turner held the position of President of the General Medical Council from 1898 to 1904, and in 1900 was President of the British Association. He was elected President of the Anatomical Society of Great Britain and Ireland from 1890 to 1893.

Turner was inducted as Principal of the University of Edinburgh on 31 January 1903, serving until 1916.

In later life he lived at 6 Eton Terrace overlooking Dean Bridge.

He died at home in Edinburgh 15 February 1916 and is buried nearby, in Dean Cemetery in the north section against the dividing wall to the original cemetery to the south. His wife and two daughters lie with him.

== Publications ==
- Atlas of Human Anatomy and Physiology (1857)
- Comparative Anatomy of the Placenta (1876)
- Anatomy (1879)

== Family ==
In 1863, he married Agnes Logan (1835–1908). They were parents to, amongst others, Arthur Logan Turner.

== Honours and awards ==
He was knighted in 1886 and made a K.C.B. in 1901. In 1894, Turner was named an honorary member of the American Association for Anatomy and was elected to honorary membership of the Manchester Literary and Philosophical Society. He received an honorary doctorate (LL.D.) from the University of St Andrews in February 1902. In 1907, he was elected an International Member of the American Philosophical Society. In December 1909, the Town Council of Edinburgh awarded him Freedom of the City.

== Recognition ==
Turner House in Pollock Halls of Residence at the University of Edinburgh is named after him.

== Artistic recognition ==
His sketch portrait of 1884, by William Brassey Hole, is held by the Scottish National Portrait Gallery. He is one of several figures of the Victorian age depicted on the Victoria monument in Dalton Square, Lancaster, UK.

Preceded by William Muir	Principals of Edinburgh University; 1903–1916	Succeeded by James Alfred Ewing
