= Goodsir =

Goodsir is a surname. Notable people with the surname include:

- Agnes Goodsir (1864–1939), Australian portrait painter
- Harry Goodsir (1819–1848), Scottish physician and naturalist
- John Goodsir (1814–1867), Scottish anatomist
- Joseph Taylor Goodsir (1815–1893), Scottish minister and theological author
- Sydney Goodsir Smith (1915–1975), Scottish writer
