= Peter Orphoot =

Peter Orphoot MD (1827–1913) was a 19th-century Scottish dental pioneer and joint founder of the Edinburgh Dental Dispensary in 1860 which later became the Edinburgh Dental Hospital.

== Life ==
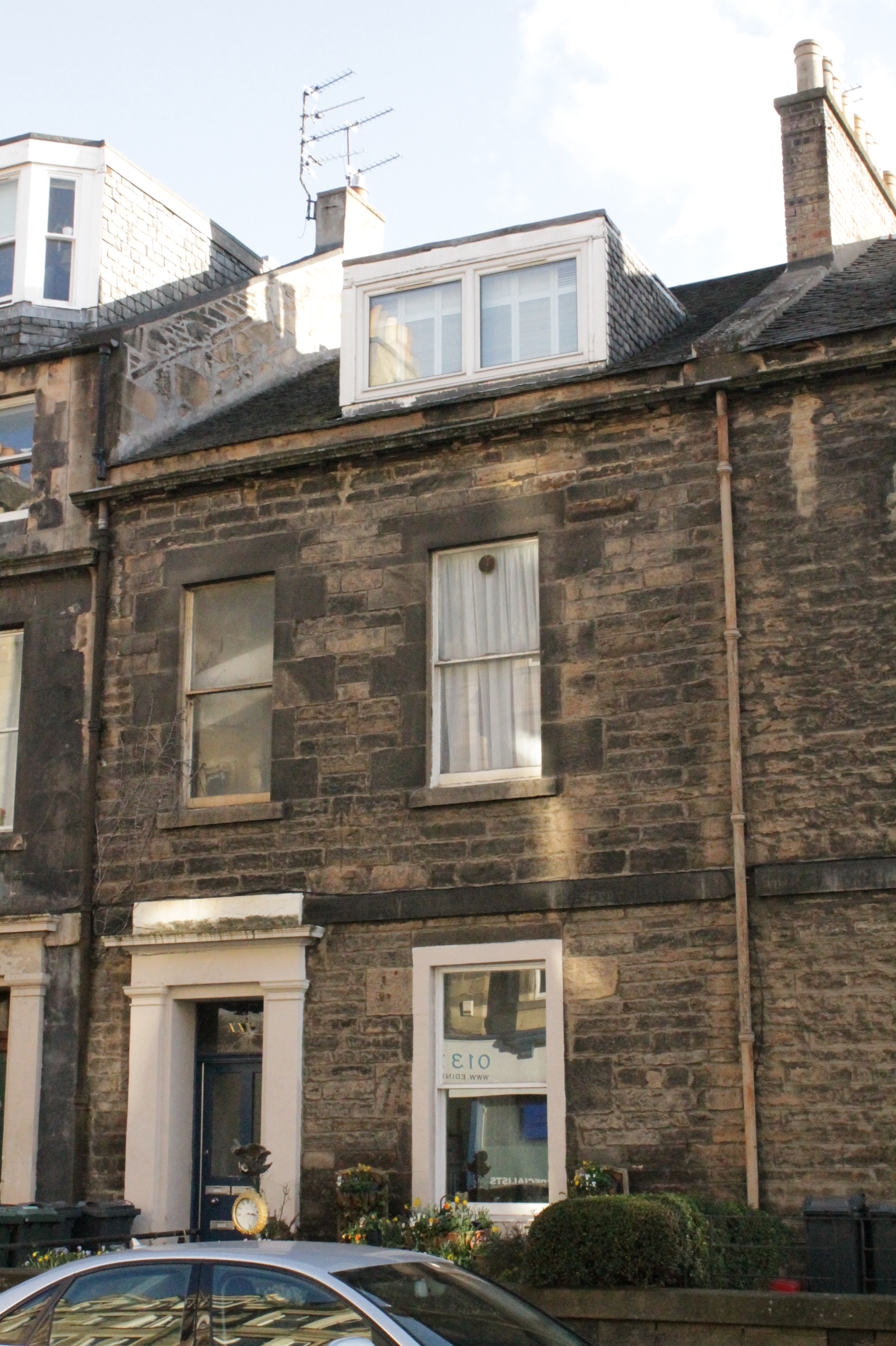
25 Gilmore Place, Edinburgh

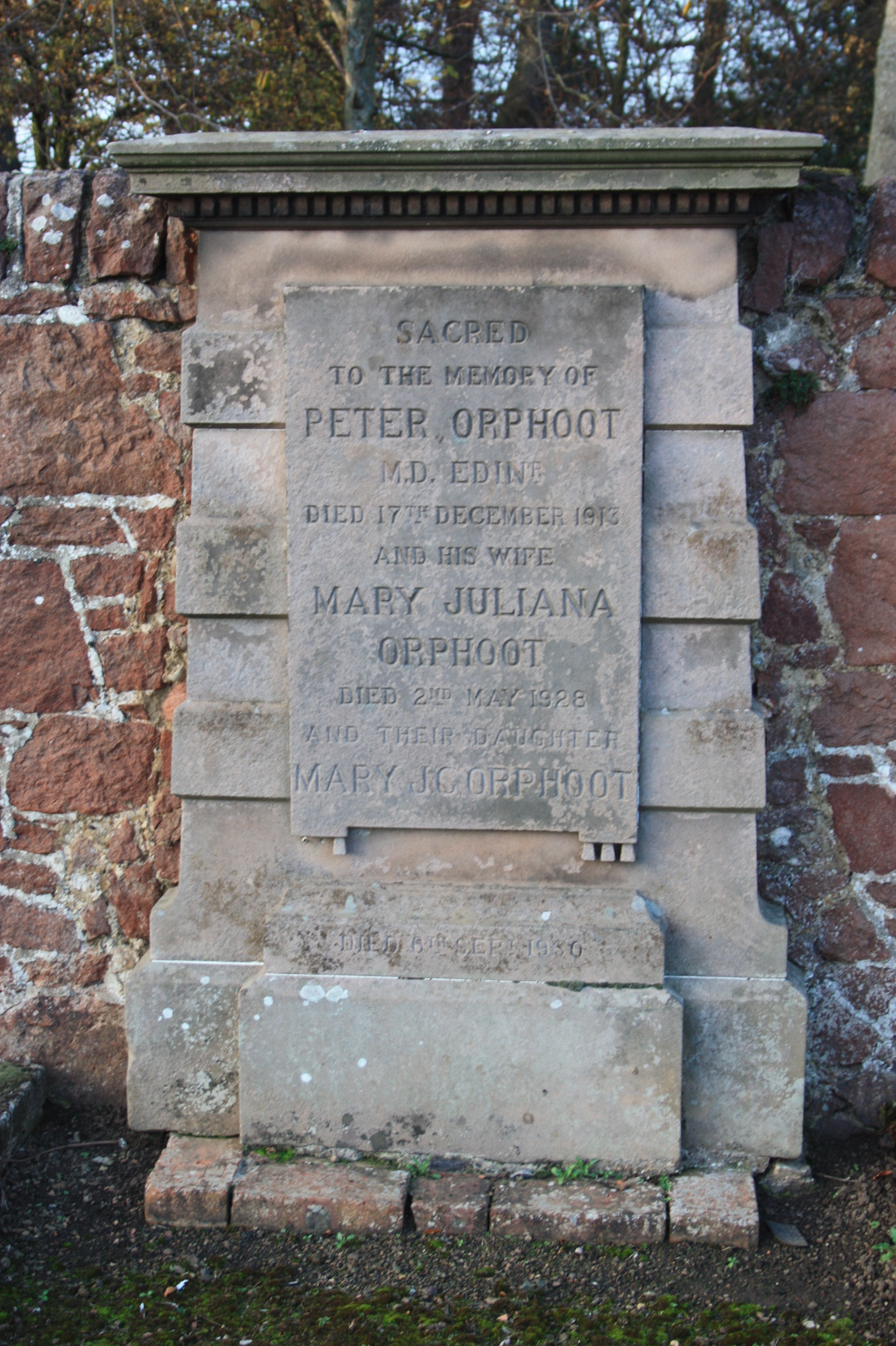
The grave of Peter Orphoot, North Berwick Cemetery

He was born in Edinburgh in 1827, the son of John Orphoot, a printer living at 23 Blackfriars Wynd (now known as Blackfriars Street) off the Royal Mile. The unusual surname is found in Lowland Scotland and appears linked to the equally unusual surname of Horfoot. His mother was Joan Clark Henderson. In 1840 the family had moved to a then-new house at 25 Gilmore Place in the Tollcross district. He graduated at the University of Edinburgh, where he obtained an M.D. with the thesis 'Few remarks on encephalitis'.

Peter first appears as an operational dentist living separate from his family, in Edinburgh in 1855.

He lived with his family at 113 George Street in Edinburgh's First New Town and also practiced from there.

In 1860, under the leadership of Dr John Smith and with the help of Robert Nasmyth and Francis Brodie Imlach, they founded the Edinburgh Dental Dispensary, specifically following concerns regarding the average dental condition of the Edinburgh population. Free treatment was seen as a good way to improve overall standards. By 1865 this had specific new premises at 1 Drummond Street in the South Side. The dispensary offered free dental treatment mainly for extractions but accepted donations. Together they pushed for legislation which led to the Dentists Act 1878 (41 & 42 Vict. c. 33), which ended the ability for unregistered persons to practice dentistry.

In 1880 the name changed to the Edinburgh Dental Hospital and in 1894 it moved from Drummond Street to the west end of Chambers Street, Orphoot being involved in all these changes. From 1864 the dispensary and later the hospital played a major role in the training of Scottish dentists, one of their most famous students being Lilian Lindsay.

He remained at 113 George Street for all his working life then retired to East Lothian.

He died on 17 December 1913 and is buried in North Berwick Cemetery against its north wall.

== Family ==
He was married to Mary Juliana Henderson (d.1926). They had a daughter, Mary Joan Clark ("Mary-Jo") Orphoot (b.1867).
