= Robert Nasmyth =

Scottish dental surgeon

Robert Nasmyth FRCSEd, FRSE
- Born: 7 November 1791; Edinburgh, Scotland
- Died: 12 May 1870 (aged 78); Edinburgh, Scotland
- Education: Royal High School, Edinburgh; Royal College of Surgeons of Edinburgh
- Occupation: Dental surgeon
- Known for: Surgeon-Dentist to the Queen in Scotland

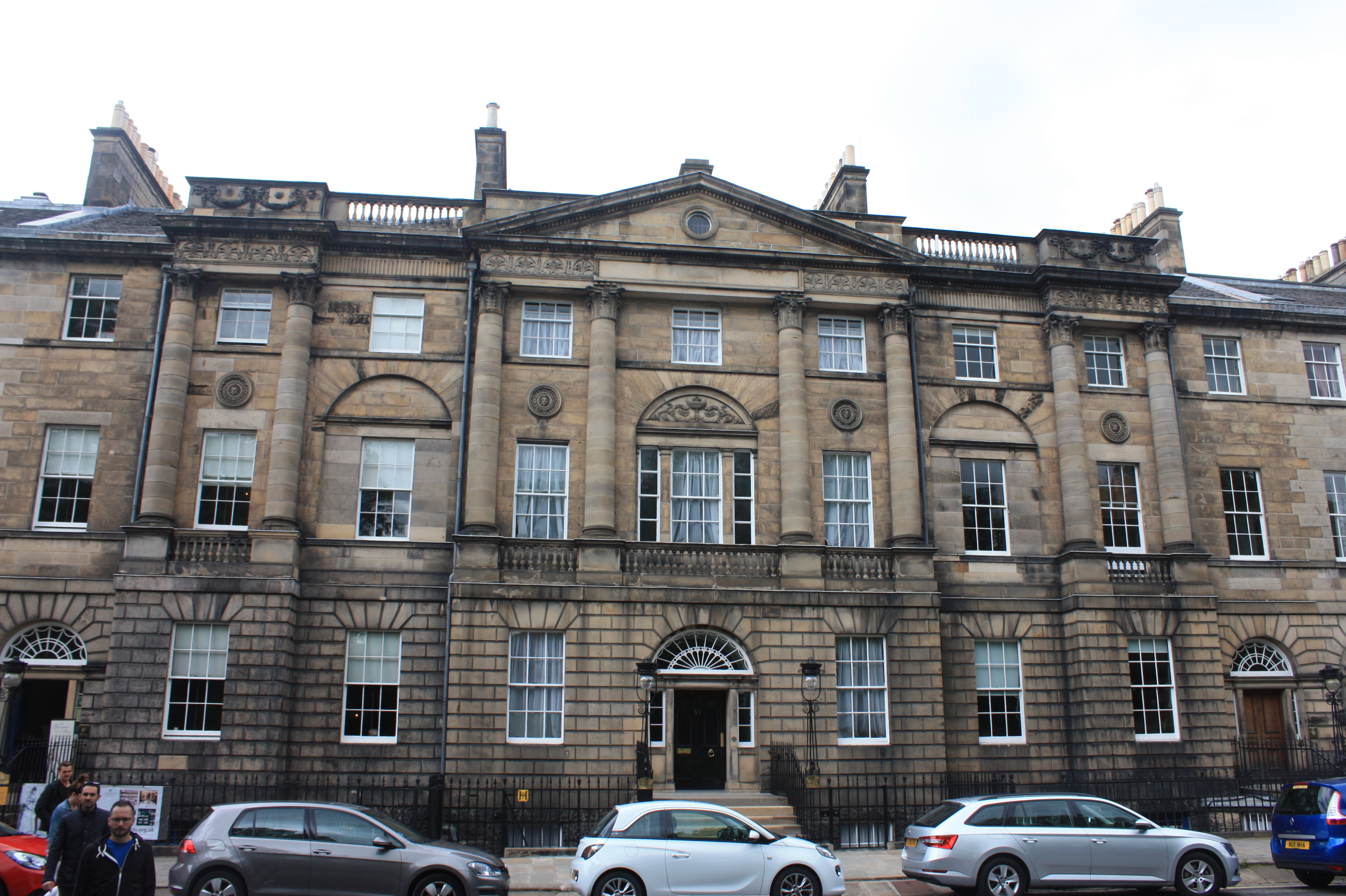
5 Charlotte Square, Edinburgh (right)

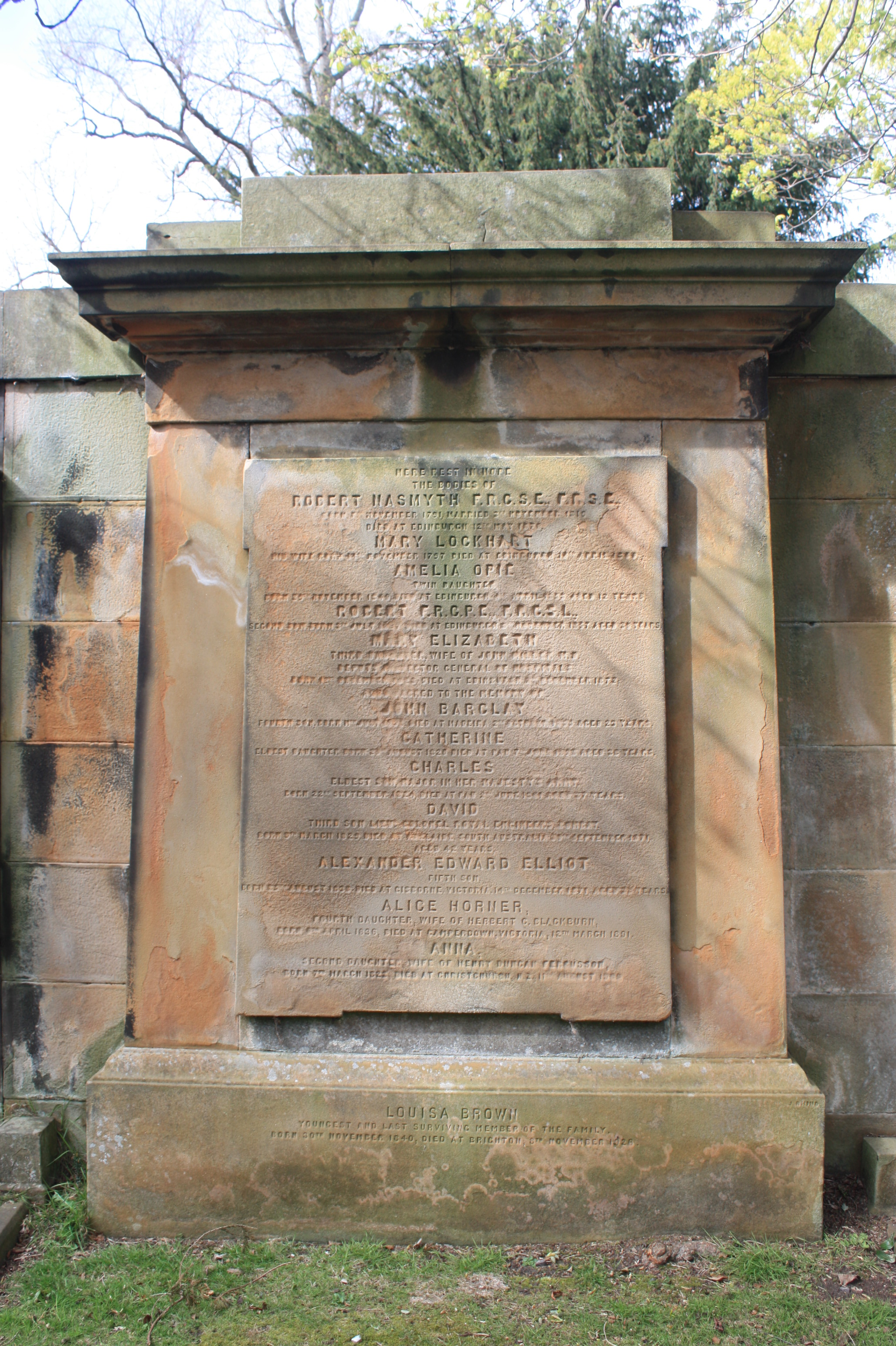
The grave of Robert Nasmyth, Dean Cemetery, Edinburgh

Robert Nasmyth FRCSEd, FRSE (7 November 1791 – 12 May 1870) was a Scottish dental surgeon from Edinburgh who was Surgeon-Dentist to Queen Victoria in Scotland. He was President of the Odonto-Chirurgical Society of Scotland and was one of the founders of the Edinburgh Dental Dispensary, which would evolve into the Edinburgh Dental Hospital and School.

== Early years ==
Robert Nasmyth was born in Edinburgh on 7 November 1791, son of Charles Nasmyth, a tailor and his wife Anne Nasmyth (née Forsyth). He was educated at the Royal High School in Edinburgh. At the age of 15, he began to study medicine at the Edinburgh Extramural School of Medicine, most notably in the anatomy school of John Barclay at 10 Surgeons' Square, where Robert Liston and James Syme were student contemporaries. He then served under Barclay for three sessions as assistant in physiology and anatomy. Barclay made a lasting impression on Nasmyth who would later dedicate his probationary essay to Barclay and name one of his sons John Barclay Nasmyth. In 1811, he passed the examination for the Diploma of the Royal College of Surgeons of Edinburgh. He then went to London where he became assistant to John Fuller, a dentist in Hatton Garden. Fuller had been one of the first to lecture on dentistry in London and had written a popular textbook on the speciality, A popular essay on the structure, formation, & management of the teeth.

== Dental career ==
Returning to Edinburgh Nasmyth was elected a Fellow of the Royal College of Surgeons of Edinburgh in 1823, submitting as his original work A probationary essay on tic douloureux, a form of facial pain. He set up practice as a dentist at 21, St Andrew Square in Edinburgh's New Town. His innovations included a cap splint, described by Liston in his textbook Practical Surgery. This was used for maxillary reconstruction after tumour excision and was "devised by my friend Mr. Nasmyth of Edinburgh... to have metal caps fitted to the teeth of the upper and lower jaws soldered or riveted together at their bases which shall have the effect when applied of preventing the remaining fragment of bone and chin being dragged to the opposite side". In 1856 it was copied in vulcanite by the American dentist T. B. Gunning (1813–1889) and it has since been known by his name.

Nasmyth also gained a reputation for his technique of gold fillings for dental cavities. Dr. Henry A Dewar, a Boston dentist wrote to Nasmyth asking that he provide details of the technique which he used to fill cavities. Nasmyth gave a detailed reply on 5 August 1838 and this was published in the Boston Medical and Surgical Journal later that year. In the introduction to Nasmyth's article, the editor writes that it describes "the important branch of filling teeth in which many decided improvements have been made, which are as yet but little known in this country or in Europe...".

It was customary for dentists to train apprentices and the most distinguished of Nasmyth's apprentices was John Goodsir (1814–1867). As he was a friend of Goodsir's father John Goodsir (1782–1848), Nasmyth agreed to waive his fee. Goodsir opted out of the apprenticeship after two years to pursue a career in anatomy. He maintained his friendship with Nasmyth over many years and in 1835 Goodsir took over Nasmyth's large Edinburgh practice during the latter's absence. Nasmyth was one of relatively few dentists experienced in this technique in Britain at that time.

Nasmyth's reputation with the technique of gold filling and his closeness to the Goodsir family has contributed to speculation about the origin of a gold dental filling in skeletal remains found in King William Island in Arctic Canada and believed to be those of a member of the ill-fated Franklin expedition. After examination of these remains in 2009 researchers suggested that these might be the skeletal remains of Harry Goodsir, John Goodsir's younger brother who was lost on the expedition.

In 1860 Nasmyth, with his friends and fellow dentists John Smith, Francis Brodie Imlach, and Peter Orphoot together founded the Edinburgh Dental Dispensary which aimed to provide clinical instruction for dental students and at the same time give dental care to the poorer citizens of Edinburgh. The Dispensary eventually became the Edinburgh Dental Hospital and School.

Nasmyth was also a founder member of the Royal Odonto-Chirurgical Society of Scotland. In 1865 John Smith arranged a meeting with David Hepburn, Robert Naysmith, Peter Orphoot, Andrew Swanson, Matthew Watt and John Wright. Smith proposed that the new society should be called "Odonto-Chirurgical Society of Scotland". The rules he had drafted were finally accepted two years later when the society was formed.

== Honours and appointments ==
In 1835 Nasmyth was elected a member of the Aesculapian Club. In 1839, Nasmyth was appointed Surgeon-Dentist to the Queen in Scotland. In 1842, he was elected a Fellow of the Royal Society of Edinburgh, his proposer being George Augustus Borthwick. He was one of the earliest office-bearers of the Odontological Society of London, having been made Vice-President in 1857. He was the first president of the Royal Odonto-Chirurgical Society of Scotland.

== Family and later life ==
Nasmyth's elder brother Alexander Nasmyth (1789–1848) also became an eminent dental surgeon. He had been brought up by an uncle, whose bookbinding business he entered, but when that failed became, at the age of 33, a dental apprentice to his younger brother Robert. Moving to London, he qualified as a Member of the Royal College of Surgeons (RCS), set up practice and was appointed Surgeon-Dentist to the Queen. In 1839, he gave a paper on the dental enamel cuticle since known as Nasmyth's membrane. He was elected a foundation Fellow of the RCS in 1844.

Robert Nasmyth married Mary Lockhart Jobson (born 1797) on 27 October 1819. Their ten children included John Barclay Nasmyth (born 1832), named for Nasmyth's teacher John Barclay, and Charles Nasmyth (1825–1861), who as an army major was described as 'the hero of Silisia' during the Crimean War.

In later life Robert Nasmyth lived at No. 5, Charlotte Square, regarded as one of the most prestigious addresses in Edinburgh, close to his colleague and friend from student days Professor James Syme who lived at No. 9.

Nasmyth died at home following a period of ill-health on 12 May 1870. He is buried on the north wall of Dean Cemetery in western Edinburgh, backing onto the first north extension.
