= John Smith (dentist) =

Scottish dentist and philanthropist (1825–1910)

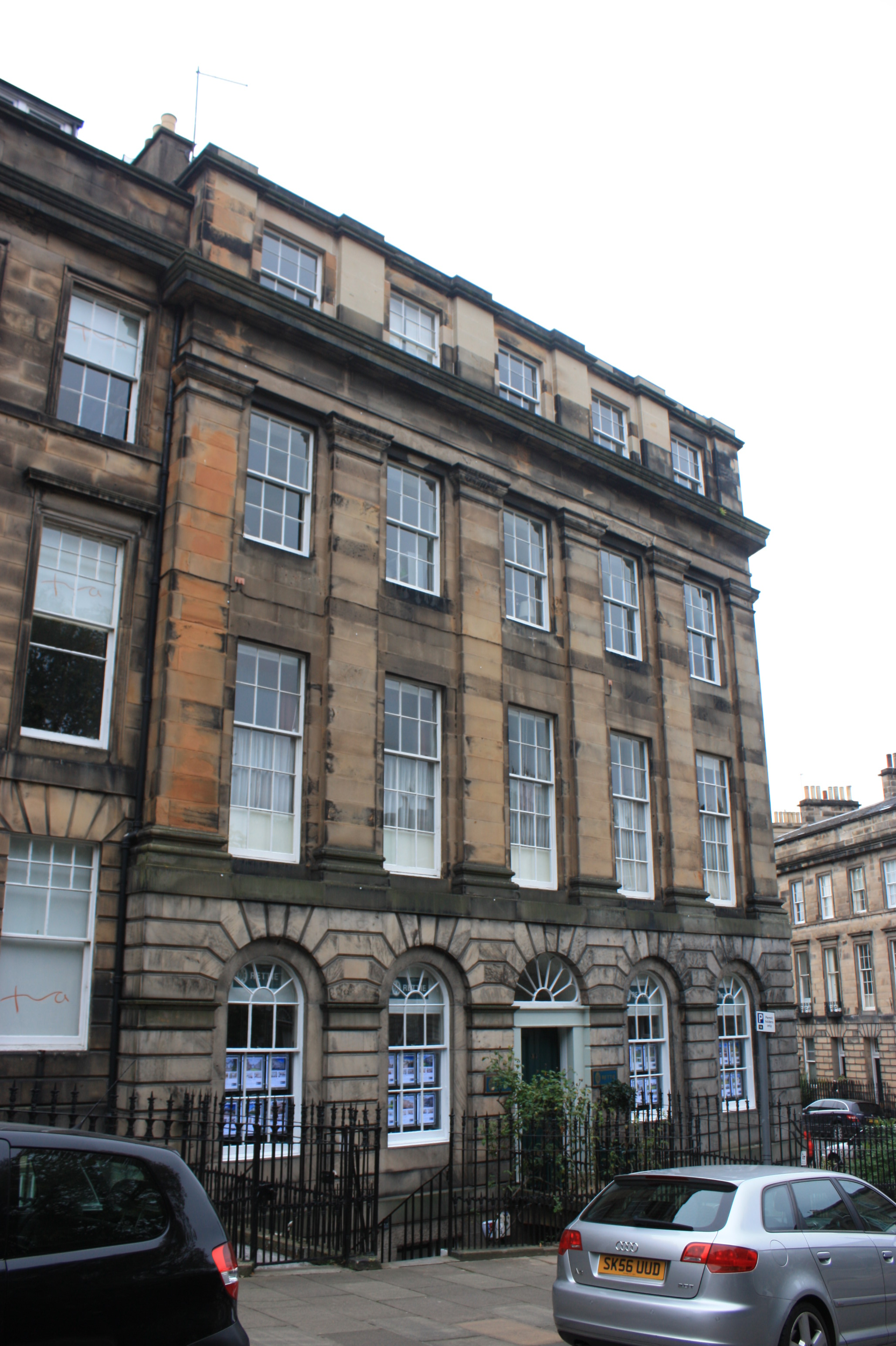
John Smith's dental surgery on the ground floor of 11 Wemyss Place, Edinburgh

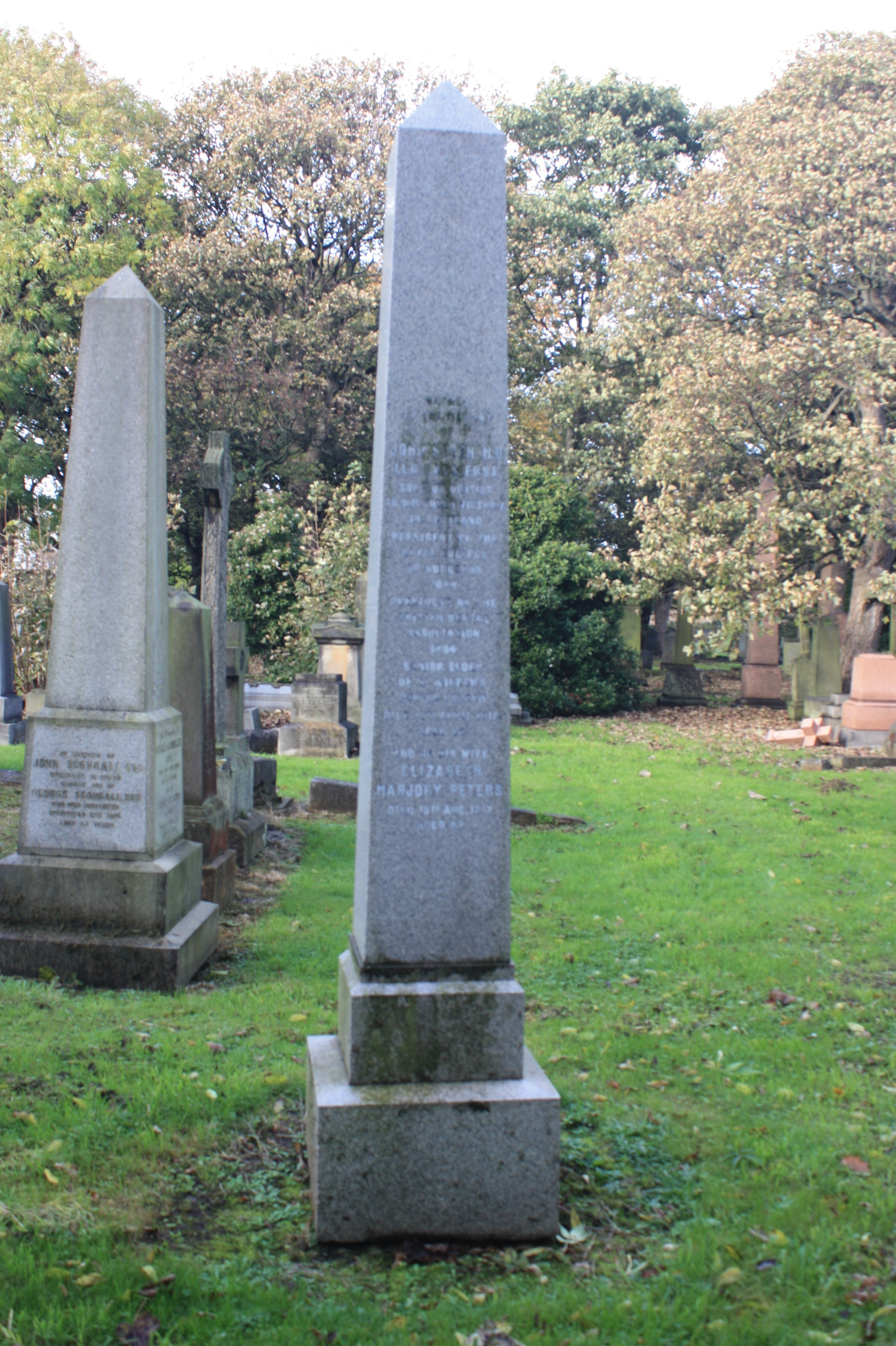
The grave of John Smith, Warriston Cemetery

John Smith (1825–1910) was a Scottish dentist, philanthropist and pioneering educator. The founder of the Edinburgh school of dentistry, he served as president of the Royal College of Surgeons of Edinburgh (1883) and president of the British Dental Association. He was the official surgeon/dentist to Queen Victoria when in Scotland.

== Life ==
Smith was born in Edinburgh, the son of dental surgeon John Smith. His family lived at 30 Frederick Street in the New Town.

He was educated at the Edinburgh Institution, the University of Edinburgh (MD 1847) and the Royal College of Surgeons. He conducted postgraduate studies in London and Paris, making drawings of gunshot and sabre wounds. He took over his father's dental practice in 1851.

In 1856 Smith started teaching the first regular courses on dental physiology and diseases in Scotland. His lectures were given at Surgeons' Hall as part of the Edinburgh Extramural School of Medicine. He was surgeon dentist to the Royal Public Dispensary. He co-founded the Hospital for Sick Children in 1859. Recognising the need for improved training, he founded, together with Francis Brodie Imlach, Peter Orphoot and Robert Nasmyth, the Edinburgh Dental Dispensary in 1860.

In 1862 Smith was elected a member of the Harveian Society of Edinburgh and served as president in 1888. In 1871 he was appointed Surgeon Dentist to Queen Victoria, and elected a Fellow of the Royal Society of Edinburgh, upon the nomination of John Hutton Balfour. In 1876 he was elected a member of the Aesculapian Club and was Honorary Secretary from 1887 to 1905.

The Dental Dispensary grew into the Edinburgh Dental Hospital and School by 1879.

He was awarded an honorary doctorate (LLD) by the University of Edinburgh in 1884.

Smith was also a moderately successful playwright. He was a senior elder in St Andrews Parish Church in Edinburgh.

In his final years he lived at 11 Wemyss Place, a fine Georgian house on the Moray Estate in Edinburgh's New Town. The dental practice element (in the same property) was taken over by William Guy from around 1899.

He died on 15 April 1910. He is buried on the edge of the path which runs over the central vaults in Warriston Cemetery.

== Family ==
In 1853 he married Elizabeth Marjory Peters (1830–1912).

== Publications ==
- Handbook of Dental Anatomy and Surgery (1864).
