= Robert Anstruther Goodsir =

Scottish doctor, explorer and writer (1823–1895)

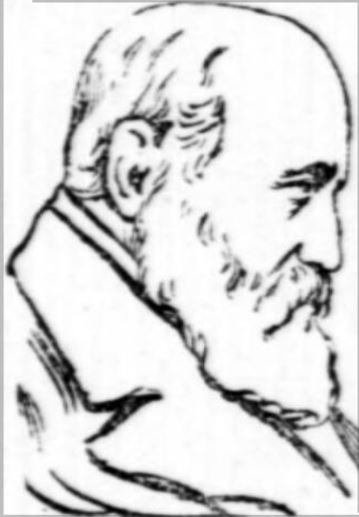
- Born: 7 July 1823; Anstruther, Fife, Scotland
- Died: 17 January 1895 (aged 71); Edinburgh, Scotland
- Education: University of Edinburgh; University of St Andrews
- Occupations: Medical practitioner, author
- Known for: Arctic voyages in search of brother
- Relatives: Joseph Goodsir (brother); Harry Goodsir (brother); John Goodsir (brother); Archibald Goodsir (brother); Jane Ross Goodsir (sister)

Robert Anstruther Goodsir (7 July 1823 – 17 January 1895) was a Scottish medical doctor, explorer and writer. He made two voyages to the Arctic in search of his brother Harry Goodsir who was lost with the Franklin expedition.

== Early life and family ==
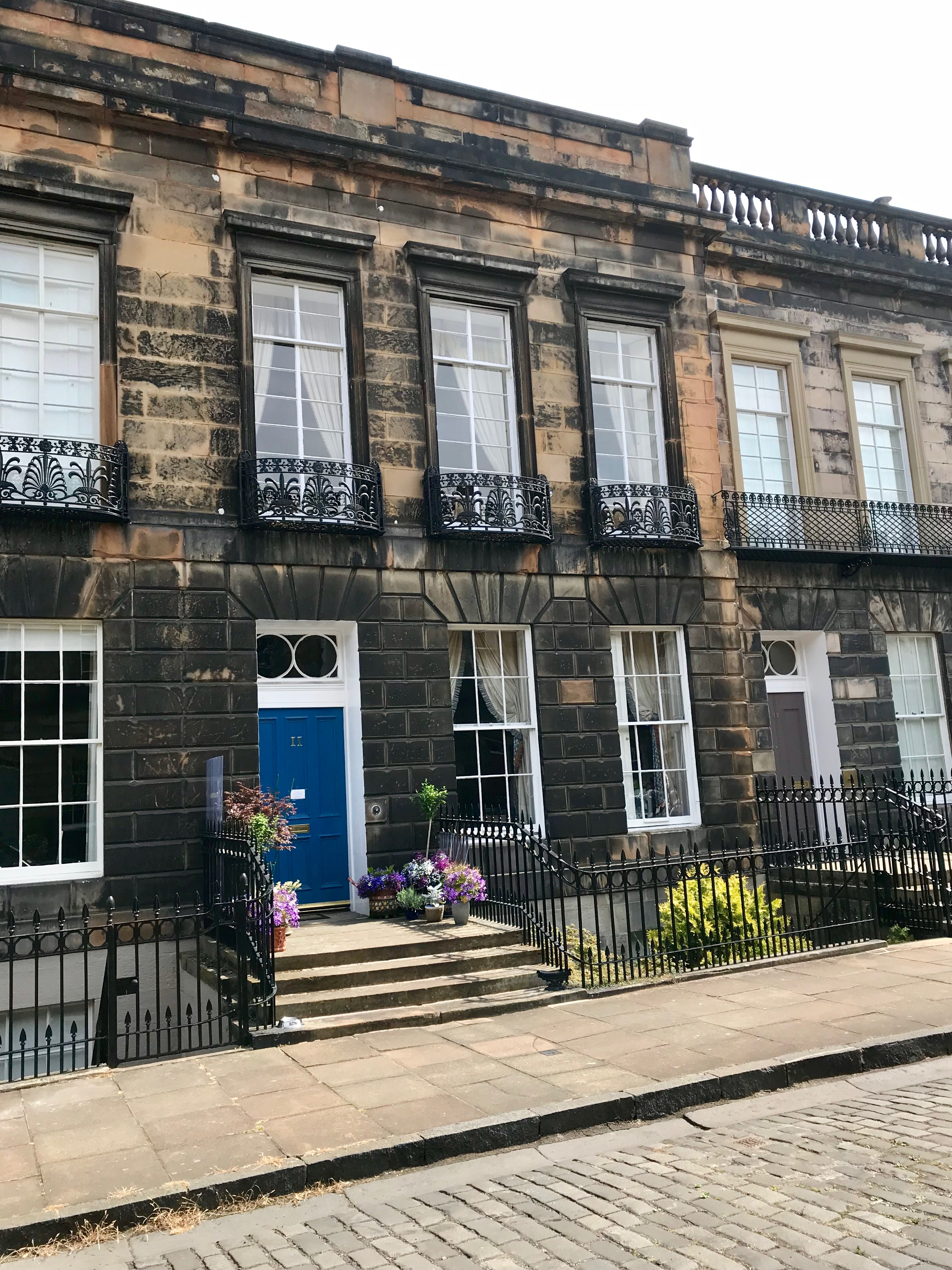
11 Danube Street, Goodsir's home in Edinburgh from 1883

He was born in Anstruther, Fife, Scotland, the son of Dr. John Goodsir (1742–1848), a medical practitioner and his wife Elizabeth Dunbar Taylor. His oldest brother John Goodsir (1814–1867) became professor of anatomy at the University of Edinburgh and was a pioneer of cell theory, the doctrine that cells form the basis of living organisms. He collaborated on this with another brother, Harry Goodsir (1819 – c. 1848), a doctor and museum curator who served as assistant surgeon and naturalist on the Franklin expedition, and was lost in the Arctic. His youngest brother, Archibald (1826–1849) also qualified in medicine as a Member of the Royal College of Surgeons of England. Another brother Joseph Taylor Goodsir (1815–1893) became a Church of Scotland minister. He had one sister Jane Ross Goodsir (1817– 1894) who was an amateur genealogist and botanist.

On 21 February 1838, Robert Goodsir was indentured to John Mill, an Edinburgh merchant, for a five-year apprenticeship. He was discharged from this arrangement on 27 January 1843, having performed his duties "properly and faithfully". He then went to London where he worked as a clerk in a banking house.

Between 1845 and 1849 he studied medicine at the University of Edinburgh but, as was common at the time, did not progress to graduation. In 1849 he was elected president of the Royal Medical Society, a student society where undergraduates and postgraduates could present research work. His studies were interrupted in March 1849 when he travelled on his first expedition to the Arctic to search for his older brother Harry.

== Arctic voyages ==
Determined to play an active role in searching for his missing brother Harry, he wrote to Lady Jane Franklin to offer his services. Through her he was introduced to Captain William Penny, who hired him as surgeon on the whaler Advice for the 1849 Arctic season. Advice and the whaler Truelove together formed the British Whaling and Franklin Search Expedition. This voyage, while profitable for the Advice, was not successful in its search for Franklin. The expedition failed to find Franklin largely because of ice in Lancaster Sound which forced it to turn back. Goodsir described this voyage in detail in his book An Arctic voyage to Baffin's Bay and Lancaster Sound : in search of friends with Sir John Franklin.

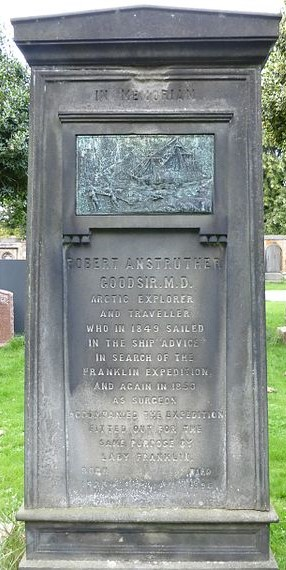
Grave of Robert Anstruther Goodsir, Dean Cemetery, Edinburgh

Goodsir's second voyage to the Arctic took place in 1850. Although he had not yet qualified in medicine, he was appointed surgeon aboard the brig Lady Franklin, again under the command of William Penny. Along with the brig Sophia they were part of the British Franklin Search Expedition, 1850–1851. This expedition had been backed by the Admiralty after pressure from Lady Franklin, who had helped finance it. On this expedition Goodsir explored the east and north coasts of Cornwallis Island. During this journey he made the discovery on Beechey Island of the graves of three members of the Franklin Expedition, John Torrington, William Braine and John Hartnell. This showed for the first time that Sir John Franklin's ships had spent the 1845–46 winter on the site. He published an account of this find in 1880.

In 1852 he qualified MD from the University of St Andrews, on the basis of his earlier studies at the University of Edinburgh, but there is no evidence that he ever practised medicine.

== Later life ==
He went in Australia in the 1850s. According to a source there, “He visited Australia at the height of the gold fever, saw a good deal of life at the diggings, turned to squatting and for many years led an active and restless life.” He had 210 acres at Ten Mile Creek near Albury by 1879.

He was back in Edinburgh by 1882 where he stayed at 11 Danube Street with his sister Jane. He died on 17 January 1895 and is buried in the Dean Cemetery, Edinburgh.

== Selected bibliography ==
- An Arctic Voyage to Baffin's Bay and Lancaster Sound, in Search of Friends with Sir John Franklin. London: J. Van Voorst, 1850
- A Fragment From The Tale of Franklin's Fate. Australia: The Australasian, 25 December 1880. (Credited as An Arctic Man of Two Voyages)
- Only an Old Chair: Its Story As Taken Down in Choice Shorthand and Done into English. Edinburgh: David Douglas, 1884.
