= John Goodsir =

Scottish anatomist (1814–1867)

John Goodsir FRS FRSE FRCSE
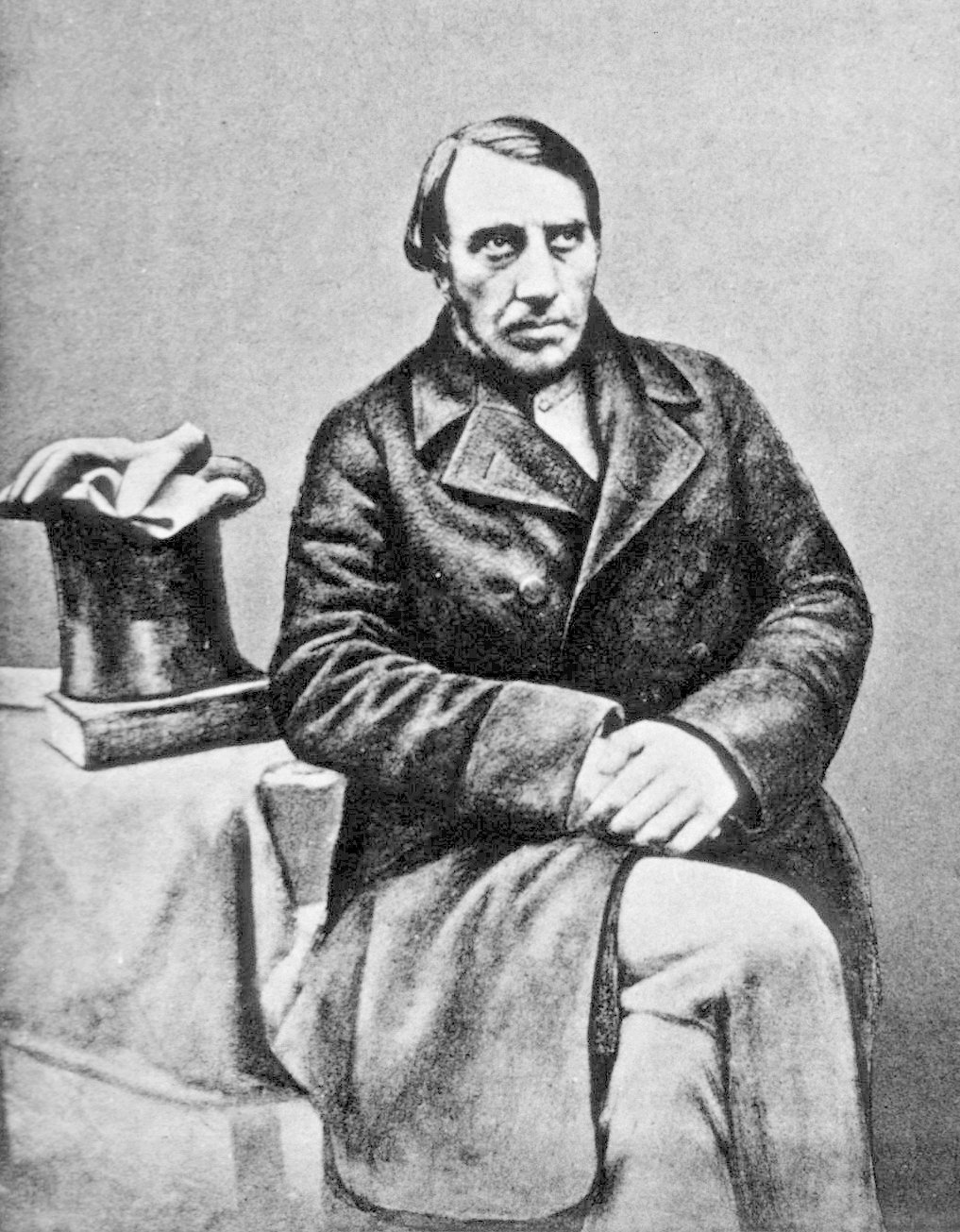
- Born: 20 March 1814; Anstruther, Fife, Scotland
- Died: 6 March 1867 (aged 52); Edinburgh, Midlothian, Scotland
- Education: University of St Andrews; University of Edinburgh
- Occupation(s): Anatomist, curator
- Relatives: Joseph Goodsir (brother); Harry Goodsir (brother); Robert Anstruther Goodsir (brother); Jane Ross Goodsir (sister)

John Goodsir FRS FRSE FRCSE (20 March 1814 – 6 March 1867) was a Scottish anatomist and a pioneer in the formulation of cell theory.

== Early life ==
Goodsir was born on 20 March 1814 in Anstruther, Fife, the son of Elizabeth Dunbar Taylor and John Goodsir (1742–1848), a medical practitioner in the town. He was baptised on 17 April 1814. His younger brother, Joseph Taylor Goodsir, entered the ministry and became minister in Lower Largo. His younger brother, Harry Goodsir, perished on the Franklin expedition. Another brother, Robert, (b. 1824) qualified as a doctor and sailed twice to the Arctic searching for his brother Harry. His youngest brother, Archibald, (b. 1826) qualified as a Member of the Royal College of Surgeons of England.

In December 1826, at the age of 12, Goodsir entered the University of St Andrews, where his classes included classics and mathematics. The following year he was apprenticed to the surgeon and dentist Robert Nasmyth, at 78 Great King Street in Edinburgh's New Town. This allowed him to enter the Edinburgh University Medical School and also attend classes at the Royal College of Surgeons of Edinburgh. He finished his apprenticeship with Nasmyth in 1833, and qualified as Licentiate of the Royal College of Surgeons of Edinburgh in 1835.

He then moved back to Anstruther to work in his father's medical practice, which allowed him to resume his boyhood hobby of searching the local coastline along the Firth of Forth for all forms of wildlife. The specimens which he collected formed the basis of the collection he later developed as a museum conservator.

In Edinburgh Goodsir had befriended Edward Forbes, who would later become Regius Professor of Natural History at the University of Edinburgh, and George Day, later Chandos Professor of Anatomy and Medicine of the University of St Andrews. Together with Goodsir's brother Joseph they rented a flat at 21 Lothian Street close to the university, which became a meeting place for scientists, writers and artists, who together called themselves the Brotherhood of the Friends of Truth.

During his surgical and dental apprenticeship with Nasmyth Goodsir had started to collect human teeth. From studies of these he made the important observation that deciduous teeth were not the 'parents' of permanent teeth but developed independently. In 1839, he published a noted paper on this topic. The following year he gave a paper to the British Association for the Advancement of Science entitled "Dentition in the ruminants", with some assistance from the University of Edinburgh Professor of Natural History, Robert Jameson. Jameson lent him an Ehrenberg microscope and encouraged him to develop microscopical studies from which Goodsir would later make major contributions to understanding of cell and tissue structure and function. Goodsir joined the Wernerian Natural History Society which had been founded by Jameson.

Among his teachers at Edinburgh it was the anatomist Robert Knox who made the greatest impression. Knox broadened Goodsir's idea of the importance of comparative anatomy in the scheme of life and in the medical curriculum. Knox appreciated his pupil's skill and gave him normal and pathological specimens to mount and preserve. The two kept in touch with each other for many years.

== Museum conservator and anatomy demonstrator ==
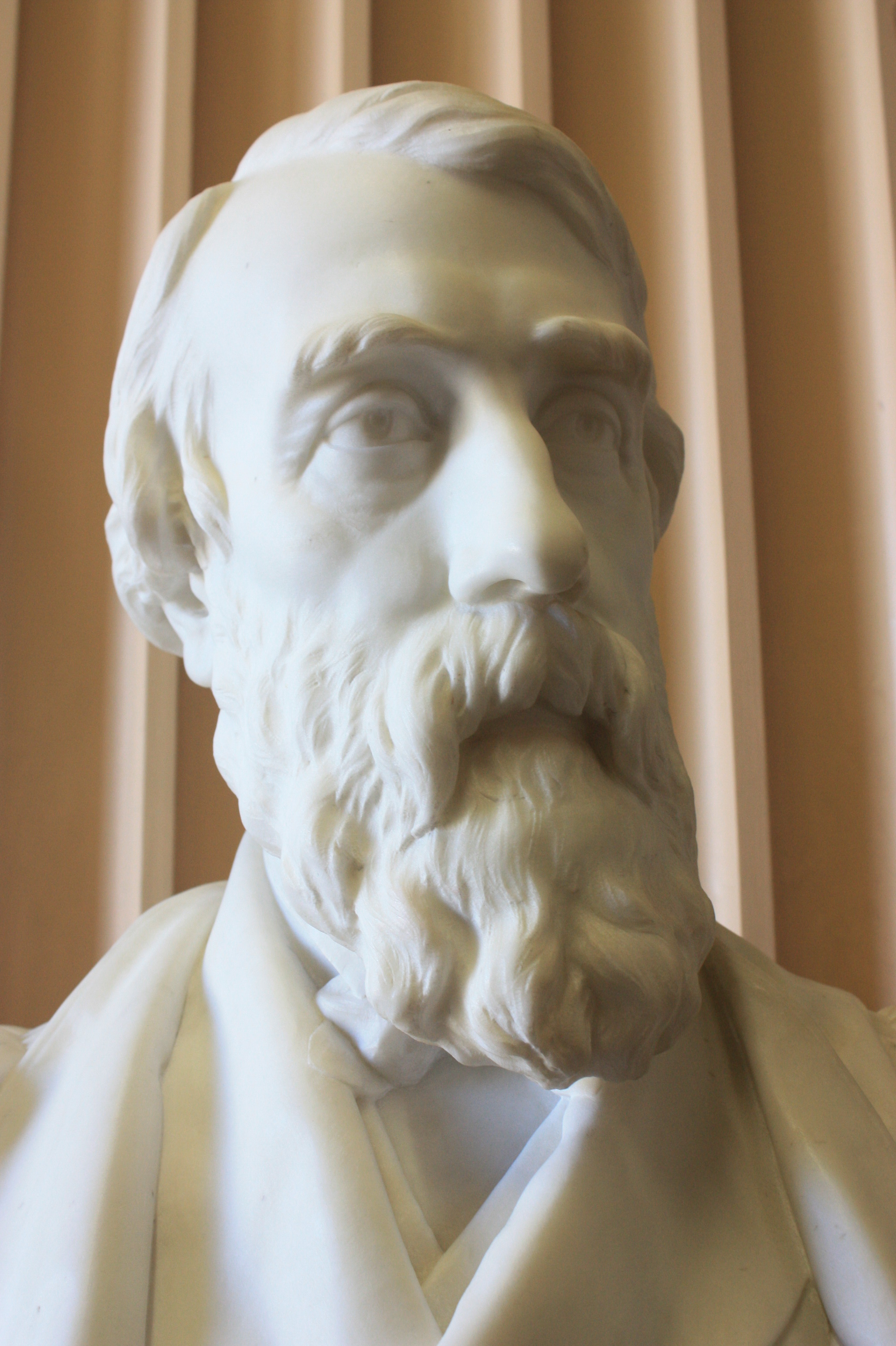
Bust of Goodsir by David Watson Stevenson, Old College, University of Edinburgh

On 21 April 1841, he was appointed conservator of the Museum of the Royal College of Surgeons of Edinburgh in succession to William MacGillivray, who had been appointed Professor of Natural History at Marischal College, Aberdeen. Goodsir promoted the museum collections by giving public lectures featuring its specimens, and by giving lectures to medical students. His lectures on pathology in 1841 and 1842 presented his innovative ideas on cell theory which were read and later developed by the German pathologist Rudolf Virchow. He gave the first description of the stomach bacterium Sarcina ventriculi which demonstrated his status as a shrewd observer and innovative thinker.

Two years later, he was appointed curator of the University of Edinburgh natural history collection and he was succeeded as RCSEd Museum Conservator by his brother, Harry Goodsir, who continued in this post until 1845. In May 1844, Goodsir was appointed Anatomy Demonstrator under Alexander Monro. His lectures attracted large numbers of students and did much to restore the University of Edinburgh's reputation for anatomical teaching which had suffered under Monro.

The following year he published, jointly with his brother Harry, Anatomical and Pathological Observations based on his earlier lectures at the RCSEd. This book brought international recognition for his ideas on cell structure and function. The Anatomical Memoirs also contain a biography by Henry Lonsdale. Goodsir also improved the quality of the instruction in the anatomy department by extending and improving the dissecting rooms, recruiting additional staff, and giving microscopic demonstrations. Goodsir's microscopists were among the first to use the achromatic microscope.

== Cell theory ==
On the basis of his studies using the compound microscope Goodsir developed his theory about the nature and structure of cellular life and organisation. He concluded that all living organisms are formed of microscopic units, cells. Goodsir was not alone in postulating such a concept and the theory that cells form the basic structure of tissues in all plants and animals has been attributed to Matthias Jakob Schleiden and to Theodor Schwann.

Goodsir posed and then answered the questions "What is a cell with its walls, contents, nucleus and nucleolus? How is a cell formed? How do cells multiply?" The theory which he developed from these studies was original and won the extravagant praise of Rudolf Virchow (1821–1902), who dedicated his masterpiece Cellular Pathology to Goodsir, describing him as "one of the earliest and most acute observers of cell-life both physiological and pathological." In 1842, Goodsir was elected a Fellow of the Royal Society of Edinburgh his proposer being James Syme. He was elected a Fellow of the Royal Society in 1846. In 1849, he was elected as a member of the American Philosophical Society.

== Professor of anatomy ==
When Alexander Monro tertius retired in 1846, Goodsir was appointed Professor of Anatomy at the University of Edinburgh. In 1848 he was elected a Fellow of the Royal College of Surgeons of Edinburgh (FRCSEd), applied for the position of Assistant Surgeon to the Royal Infirmary of Edinburgh, but was not appointed. He moved into Edward Forbes's South Cottage at Wardie in north Edinburgh where he spent the last ten years of his life. Such was the improvement that he brought about in anatomy teaching that by 1860–1861 the size of the anatomy class had grown to 354.

== Later years ==
From 1850, Goodsir became unwell, showing the features of the chronic wasting illness which would eventually prove fatal. It made slow and insidious progress and assumed the characters of locomotor ataxia. Yet despite this, after the death of his friend Edward Forbes in 1854, he took on Forbes's lectures in addition to his own. In 1863, he was invited to assist Sir David Brewster with an article for the North British Review on Faivre's analysis of Goethe's studies. Brewster, a distinguished physicist and mathematician and now Principal of the University of Edinburgh, had known Goodsir from 1839, when both were members of the Literary and Philosophical Society of St Andrews.

Goodsir died at South Cottage, Wardie, Edinburgh on 6 March 1867, at the age of 52. He is buried alongside one of the central paths in Dean Cemetery, Edinburgh, next to his friend Forbes.
