= Harry Goodsir =

Scottish physician and naturalist (1819 - c. 1848)

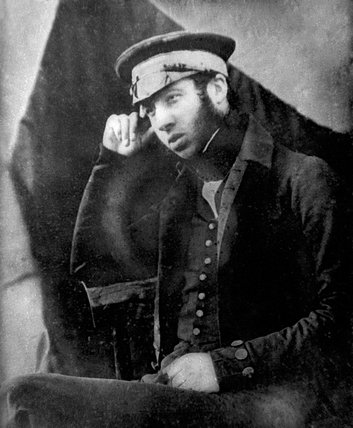
- Goodsir in 1845
- Born: Harry Duncan Spens Goodsir; 3 November 1819; Anstruther, Fife, Scotland
- Died: c. 1848 (aged 28–29); King William Island, Canada
- Relatives: Joseph Goodsir (brother); Robert Anstruther Goodsir (brother); Jane Ross Goodsir (sister); Archibald Goodsir (brother); John Goodsir (brother)
- Military career
- Branch: Royal Navy
- Service years: 1845–1848
- Rank: Junior Medical Officer
- Expeditions: Franklin Expedition

Henry Duncan Spens Goodsir (3 November 1819 – c. 1848) was a Scottish physician and naturalist who contributed to the pioneering work on cell theory done by his brother John Goodsir. He served as surgeon and naturalist on the ill-fated 1845 Franklin expedition. His body was never found, but forensic studies in 2009 on skeletal remains earlier recovered from King William Island in Canada suggest that they may be those of Harry Goodsir.

== Early life ==
Harry Goodsir was born on 3 November 1819 in Anstruther, Fife, the son of Dr. John Goodsir, a medical practitioner. His paternal grandfather, also Dr. John Goodsir, had been a medical practitioner in the nearby town of Lower Largo. Three of Harry's brothers became medical practitioners. John Goodsir, his elder brother, would become Professor of Anatomy at Edinburgh University and a pioneer of the doctrine that cells formed the basis of living organisms. His younger brother Robert Anstruther Goodsir qualified as a medical doctor from the University of St Andrews, and Archibald studied in Edinburgh and Leipzig and qualified with membership of the Royal College of Surgeons of England.

== Career ==
He studied medicine in Edinburgh and became a member of the Royal Medical Society. Having qualified as Licentiate of the Royal College of Surgeons of Edinburgh in 1840, he succeeded his brother John as Conservator of the Surgeons' Hall Museum in August 1843. He held this post until March 1845, when he left to join the Franklin expedition, and he was succeeded as conservator by his brother Archibald.

=== Cell theory ===
In 1845, he co-authored, with his brother John, Anatomical and Pathological Observations. This contained John's unpublished 1841–1842 lectures to which his brother had "added some of his own zoological, anatomical, and pathological observations." The three chapters supplied by Harry were seen by his brother as providing important confirmatory evidence to his cellular theory. It was this book that was to win John Goodsir international acclaim and led to the German pathologist Rudolf Virchow dedicating his epoch-making volume to him.

== Franklin expedition ==
Rear Admiral Sir John Franklin, who had previously served on three expeditions to the Arctic, set off in what would prove Franklin's final expedition in 1845, commanding HMS Erebus and HMS Terror. There were four medical officers: Dr. Stephen Stanley and surgeon Harry Goodsir on HMS Erebus, and Dr. John Peddie and Dr. Alexander McDonald on HMS Terror.

Goodsir's final communication was a paper entitled "On the anatomy of Forbesia", which was "... transmitted by the author from Disko Island in Greenland in June 1845." This was published five years later, and is a comprehensive description of the insect species with 18 detailed illustrations. He is described as "Acting surgeon on HMS Erebus". The expedition was last seen by Europeans one month later in July 1845.

Goodsir's younger brother Robert joined two of the expeditions which attempted to find the Franklin expedition. In 1849, he joined the whaler Advice under the command of Scotsman William Penny, in what was the first of many unsuccessful attempts to find Franklin and his men. Robert Goodsir wrote an account of this voyage: An Arctic voyage to Baffin's Bay and Lancaster Sound: in search of friends with Sir John Franklin. He joined Penny again in 1850 as surgeon on the Admiralty-backed Franklin search expedition with the ships Lady Franklin and Sophia.

Robert Goodsir graduated as a medical doctor from St. Andrews University in 1852, but rarely practiced medicine, travelling to New Zealand as a gold prospector and to Australia as a sheep farmer, before returning to Edinburgh where he died in 1895. He is buried there in Dean Cemetery.

=== Remains ===
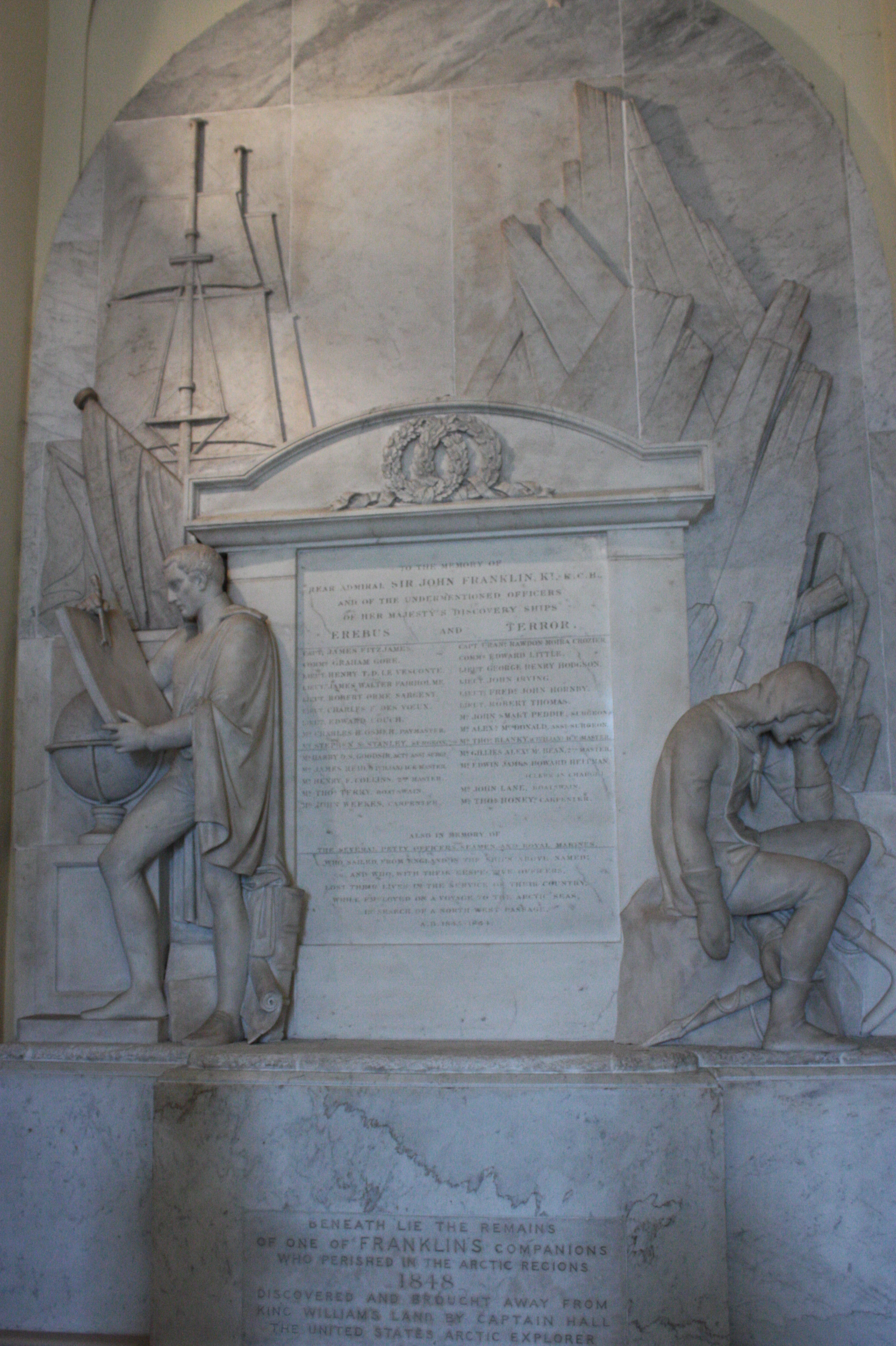
The memorial to the Franklin Expedition in the Chapel of the Naval College at Greenwich, containing Goodsir's body

Between 1849 and 1959, skeletal remains representing at least 30 individuals were discovered on King William Island, and most were buried locally. In 1869, American explorer Charles Francis Hall was taken by local Inuit to a shallow grave on King William Island containing well-preserved skeletal remains and fragments of clothing. These remains were repatriated and interred beneath the Franklin Memorial at Greenwich Old Royal Naval College, London. The remains were thought to be those of an officer due to the remnants of a silk vest in which the body had been clothed and a gold tooth filling. After examination of the remains by the eminent biologist Thomas Henry Huxley, the Admiralty concluded that the remains were those of Henry Le Vesconte, a lieutenant on HMS Erebus.

A subsequent examination in 2009 of the "well-preserved and fairly complete skeleton of a young adult male of European ancestry" included a facial reconstruction that showed "excellence of fit" with the face of Harry Goodsir, as portrayed in his 1845 daguerreotype. Strontium and oxygen isotope data from tooth enamel were consistent with an upbringing in eastern Scotland, but not with Lt. Le Vesconte's upbringing in southwest England. A further clue suggesting these might be Goodsir's remains was a gold filling in a premolar tooth, unusual at that time. Goodsir's family were friendly with Robert Nasmyth, an Edinburgh dentist with an international reputation for such work. Harry's brother John had served as dental apprentice to Nasmyth. Analysis of the bones suggest that death was caused by an infected tooth.

== In popular culture ==
Harry Goodsir appears as a character in the 2007 novel The Terror by Dan Simmons, a fictionalized account of Franklin's lost expedition, as well as the 2018 television adaptation, where he is portrayed by Paul Ready.

== See also ==
- List of people who disappeared mysteriously at sea
