= Joseph Taylor Goodsir =

Scottish minister and theological author

Joseph Taylor Goodsir FRSE
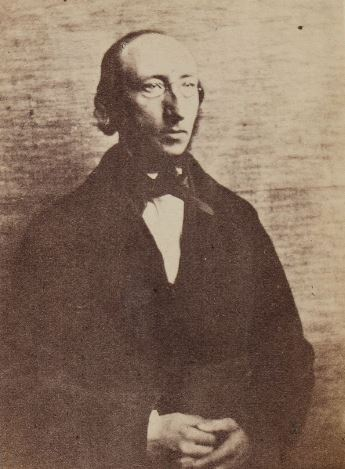
- Born: 16 September 1815; Lower Largo, Fife, Scotland
- Died: 27 April 1893 (aged 77); Edinburgh, Scotland
- Education: United College, St Andrews; University of Edinburgh
- Occupation: Minister of religion
- Known for: Theology writing Virchow controversy
- Relatives: Harry Goodsir (brother); Robert Anstruther Goodsir (brother); Jane Ross Goodsir (sister); Archibald Goodsir (brother); John Goodsir (brother)

Joseph Taylor Goodsir FRSE (16 September 1815 – 27 April 1893) was a Scottish minister and theological author. He resigned from the ministry after only seven years expressing doubts about the doctrine and teaching of the Church of Scotland. He continued to write theological essays critical of the Church's theology and teaching. He is remembered for his unsuccessful attempt to prevent the election of the German physician and pathologist Rudolph Virchow to the Fellowship of the Royal Society of Edinburgh. In later years he developed a depressive illness with delusions and paranoia which resulted in admissions to the local asylum where he was detained for the last eleven years of his life.

== Early life ==
Joseph Goodsir was born in Lower Largo, Fife, on 16 September 1815, the second son of Elizabeth Dunbar Taylor (1785–1841) and her husband, John Goodsir (1782–1848), surgeon in Anstruther. His elder brother John Goodsir; became professor of anatomy at the University of Edinburgh. After schooling in Anstruther, Joseph Goodsir matriculated at United College, St. Andrews and between 1828 and 1832 he studied for a broad based arts degree. He went on to study divinity at the University of Edinburgh from 1833 to 1837. During this time he lived in a flat at 21 Lothian Street with his brother John, Edward Forbes and others. Here they founded a group named the Universal Brotherhood of Friends of Truth. This fraternity had members with interests in the arts, science, poetry, and literature. The brethren supported each other with "co-operation in research, assistance in danger and adversity and with advice and friendship". After graduating and ordination as a Church of Scotland minister he applied for the vacant ministry at Duddingston Kirk, Edinburgh but was unsuccessful.

== Minister and theologian ==
His application as minister of Lower Largo was successful and he became parish minister on 14 July 1843. Shortly after he began to have doubts about the teaching of Church and in 1845 published Sacramental Catechism, a monograph critical of the Church's theology on the sacrament of communion. He resigned from the Church in 1850 after only seven years in the ministry because, in his own words, "“the standards of the Church were not consistent with the teaching of the scripture.” The following year he wrote an essay The Westminster Confession of Faith and Dogmatic and Systematic Standards which was critical of the Westminster Confession of Faith which had been adopted by the Church of Scotland as its doctrinal standard. Over the succeeding years he continued to write theological essays critical of the Church's doctrine.

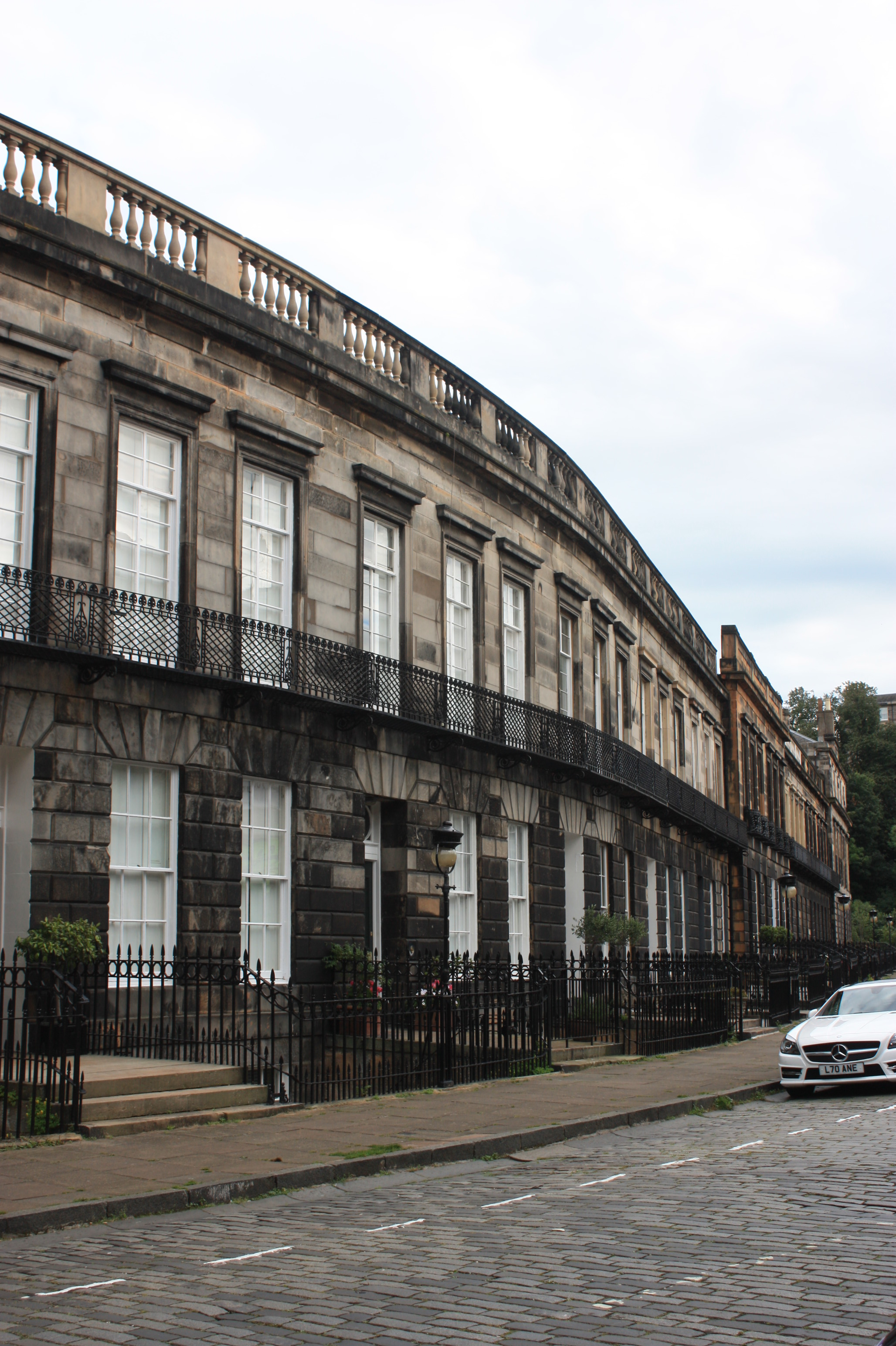
Danube Street, Edinburgh

From 1854 he began to develop the features of a psychotic illness which recurred throughout the rest of his life. In 1856 he was detained at the Royal Edinburgh Asylum at Morningside at the request of his brother John with a diagnosis of "melancholia." He lived at 11 Danube street Edinburgh with his sister Jane, but had further detentions at the Asylum in 1858 and 1874.

== The Virchow controversy ==
Goodsir was elected a Fellow of the Royal Society of Edinburgh (RSE) in March 1868, his proposer being the anatomist Sir William Turner. Later that year the society proposed to award an honorary fellowship to the renowned German physician and pathologist Rudolf Virchow, often referred to as "the father of modern pathology." Joseph Goodsir objected to this on the grounds that Virchow had not given sufficient credit to his brother John Goodsir for his work on cellular theory. He published a monograph entitled Grounds of objection to the admission of Professor Virchow as an Honorary Fellow of the Royal Society of Edinburgh, which was circulated to all fellows of the society. In the monograph he compared what Virchow had written in Cellular Pathology on the origin and role of cells with the earlier work on the topic published by his brother, John Goodsir, pointing out the similarity of the wording and claiming that Virchow was guilty of plagiarism. This provoked an angry response from the RSE refuting these allegations, pointing out that Virchow had indeed cited Goodsir both in three earlier articles and in his textbook and furthermore had dedicated the English language edition of Cellular Pathology to John Goodsir, "as a slight testimony of his deep respect and sincere admiration". They concluded "Joseph Goodsir has not only acted unwisely, he has done injury to the great name of his brother John." Virchow was duly elected to honorary fellowship of the RSE and Goodsir resigned his fellowship in 1880.

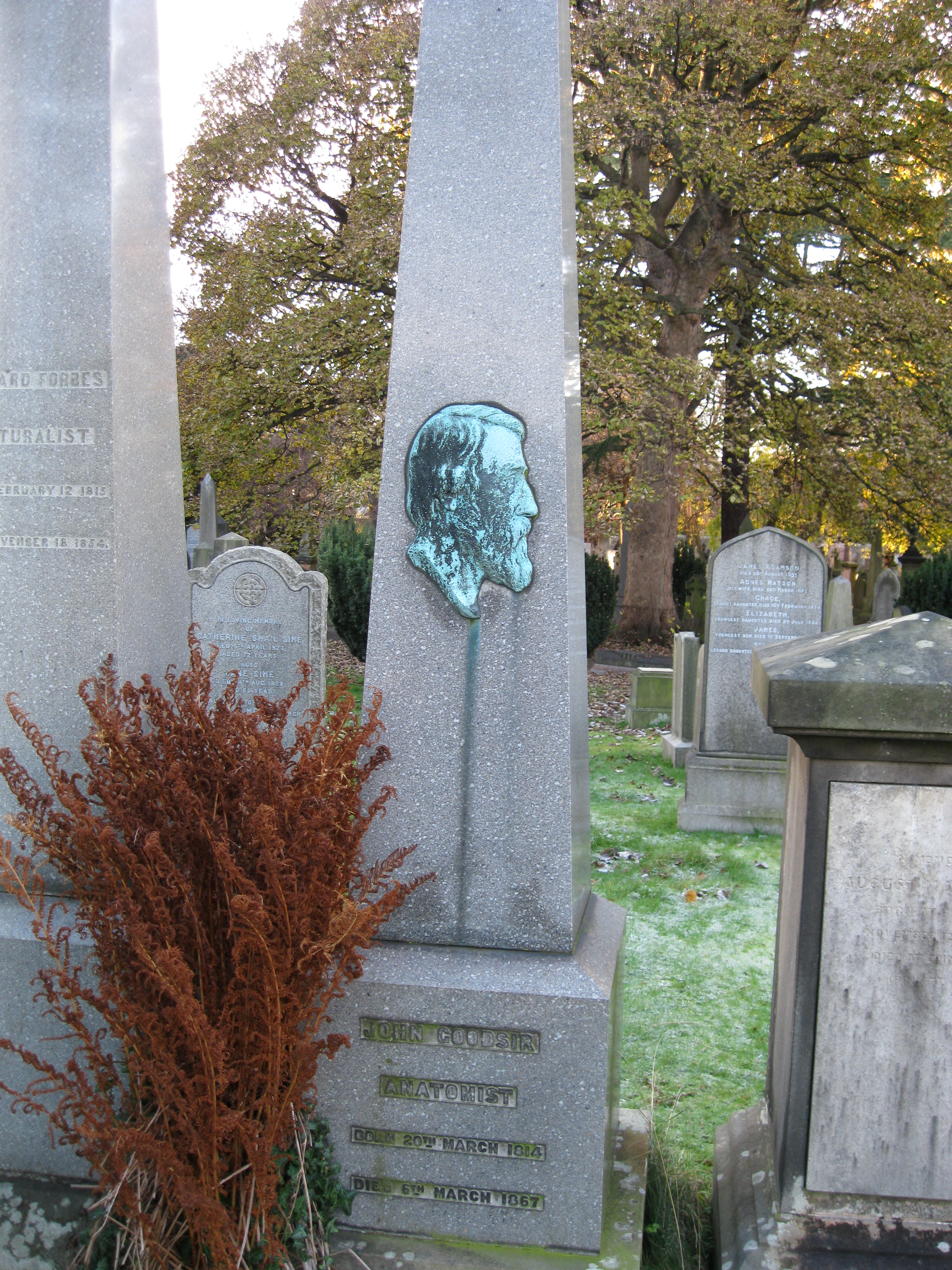
Obelisk marking grave of John Goodsir (1814–1867). Joseph Taylor Goodsir is also buried in the grave.

== Later life and death ==
He had further admissions to the Royal Edinburgh Asylum with melancholia. His mental health continued to deteriorate with features including, 'religious mania', hallucinations, paranoia and suicidal thoughts. He was detained in the asylum for the final time in 1881 and spent the last eleven years of his life detained there until his death on 27 April 1893. He was buried in the grave of his brother John in Dean Cemetery, Edinburgh. The obelisk marking the grave makes no mention of the fact that he is buried there.

== Family ==
Joseph Goodsir had one older brother and five younger siblings. John (1814–1867), who was curator of Surgeons Hall Museum and Professor of Anatomy at the University of Edinburgh. His sister Jane Ross Goodsir (1817–1893) did not marry and lived for most of her adult life at 11 Danube Street, Edinburgh. Harry Duncan Spens Goodsir (1819 – c1847) was a doctor, curator and served as assistant surgeon and naturalist on the Franklin expedition. Agnes Johnstone Goodsir (b.1821) died in childhood. Robert Anstruther Goodsir (1823–1895) qualified as a doctor and joined expeditions to the Arctic in 1849 and in 1850 to search for his brother Harry. Archibald Goodsir (1826–1849) qualified as a doctor but died of consumption at the age of 23 years

== Selected publications ==
- Goodsir, Joseph Taylor (1845). Sacramental catechism. OCLC 951030614.
- The Westminster Confession of Faith and Dogmatic and Systematic Standards. Edinburgh (1851)
- What, and Whence Drawn (1852)
- Goodsir, Joseph Taylor (1866). The Biblical and Patristic Doctrine of Salvation. OCLC 752442064.
- Examination of the Westminster Confession of Faith on the Basis of the Other Protestant Confessions (1866)
- Goodsir, Joseph Taylor (1868). The Divine Rule proceeds by Law. OCLC 1064604646.
- Goodsir, Joseph Taylor (1871). Seven homilies on ethnic inspiration. Williams and Norgate. OCLC 794646174.
- Goodsir, Joseph Taylor (1868). Grounds of objection to the admission of Professor Virchow as an honorary fellow of the Royal Society of Edinburgh. Neill & Co. OCLC 654681959.
