= Lower Largo =

Coordinates: 56.214°N 2.941°W

- Location within Fife
- Population: 2,390 (2020)
- Council area: Fife
- Lieutenancy area: Fife
- Country: Scotland
- Sovereign state: United Kingdom
- Post town: LEVEN
- Postcode district: KY8
- Police: Scotland
- Fire: Scottish
- Ambulance: Scottish
- UK Parliament: North East Fife
- Scottish Parliament: Mid Fife and Glenrothes

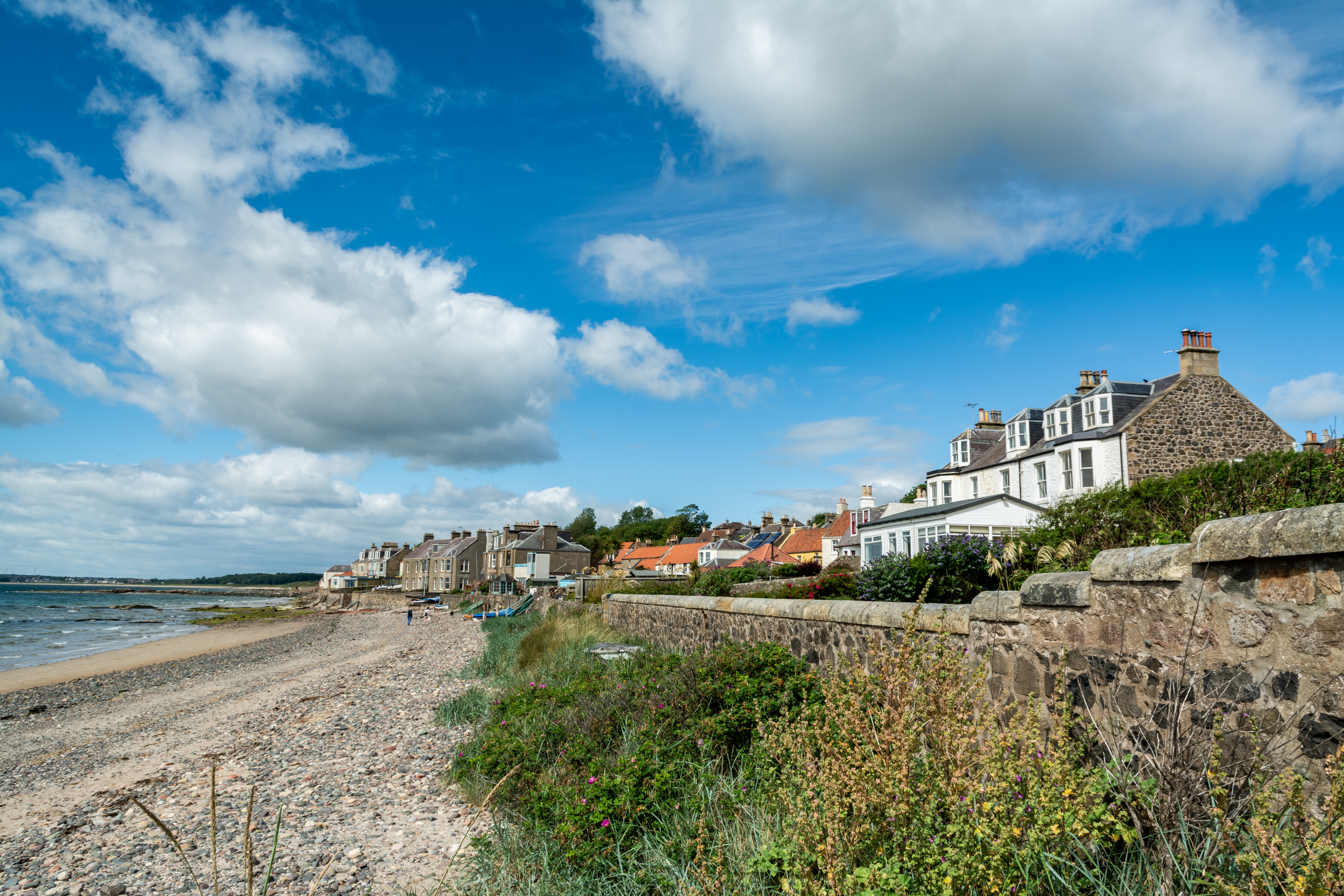
Lower Largo, Fife, Scotland

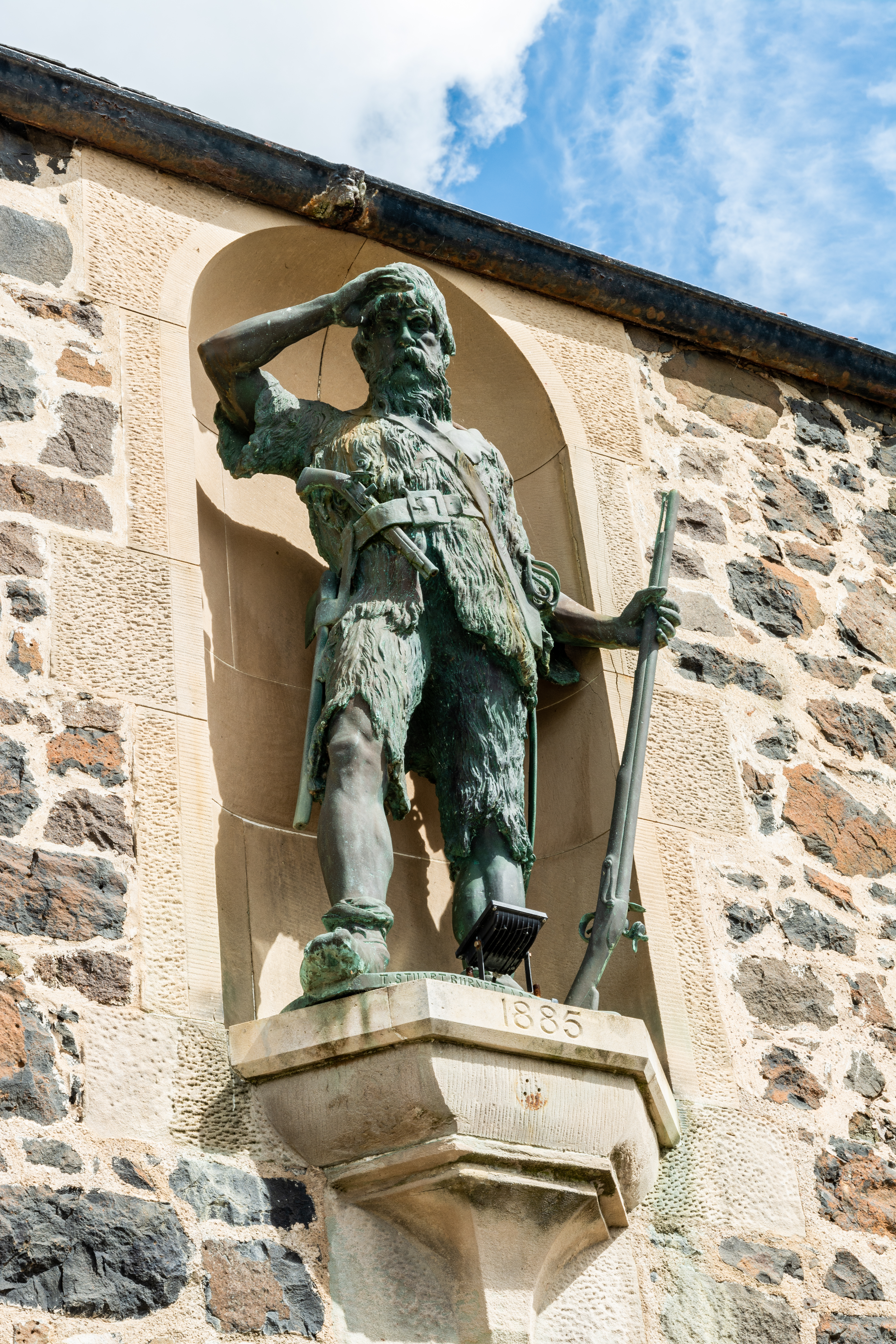
Statue of Alexander Selkirk in Lower Largo by Thomas Stuart Burnett

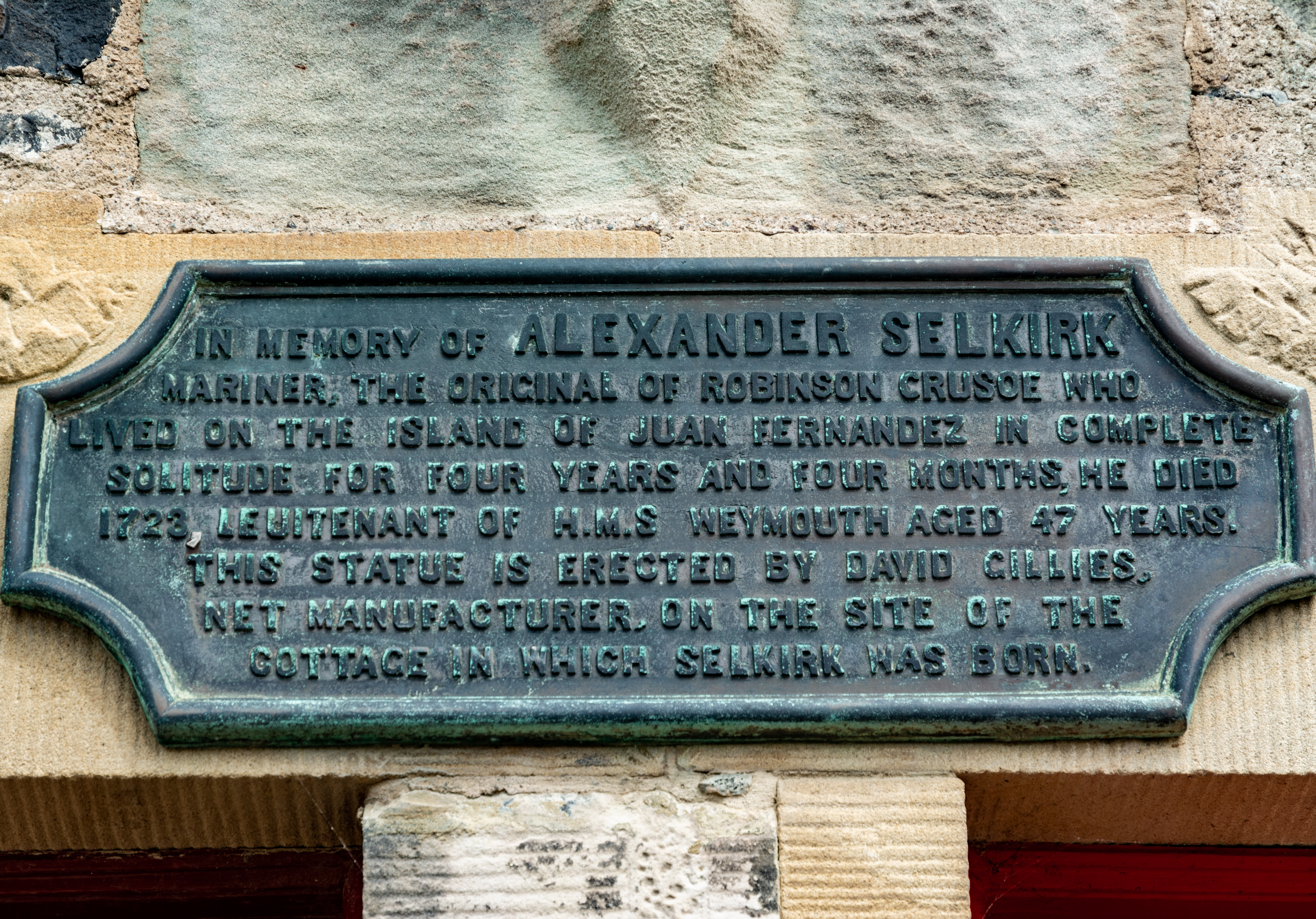
Plaque for Alexander Selkirk in Lower Largo

Lower Largo or Seatown of Largo is a village in Fife, Scotland, situated on Largo Bay along the north side of the Firth of Forth. It is east of, and contiguous with, Lundin Links.

Largo is an ancient fishing village in the parish of Largo. An excavated late 5th century cemetery points to an early settlement of the site, and there are records of the Knights Templar holding lands to the east of the town in the 12th century. It was made a "burgh of barony" by James IV for Sir Andrew Wood in August 1513. This meant it had the right to erect a mercat cross and hold weekly markets, but not the extensive trading rights of a royal burgh. In 1654, Dutch cartographer Joan Blaeu mentions Largo as "Largow burne-mouth" in his Nova Fifae Descriptio.

Lower Largo is famous as the 1676 birthplace of Alexander Selkirk, who provided inspiration for Daniel Defoe's Robinson Crusoe. The house that now stands at his birthplace on 99-105 Main Street features a life-sized statue of Selkirk wearing self-made goatskin clothes, scanning the horizon. A signpost at the harbour points to Juan Fernández Islands, some 7,500 miles distant, where Selkirk lived for more than four years as a castaway.

The arrival of the railway in 1857 brought many tourists to Lower Largo's sandy beach. The village has retained many historic buildings from the 17th to 19th century, and in 1978 it was designated as a conservation area.

The Fife Coast Railway line through Lower Largo was closed in 1965 as part of the restructuring programme of British railways known as the Beeching cuts (overseen by Richard Beeching), and though it has been disused since then the viaduct that dominates the village remains an important local landmark.

The war memorial in Lower Largo was designed by Sir Robert Lorimer.

== Fishing ==
Although the overall quantity and value of the fish landed did not decline, the statistics show that Largo declined as a fishing port in the years before the First World War.

Fishery Statistics

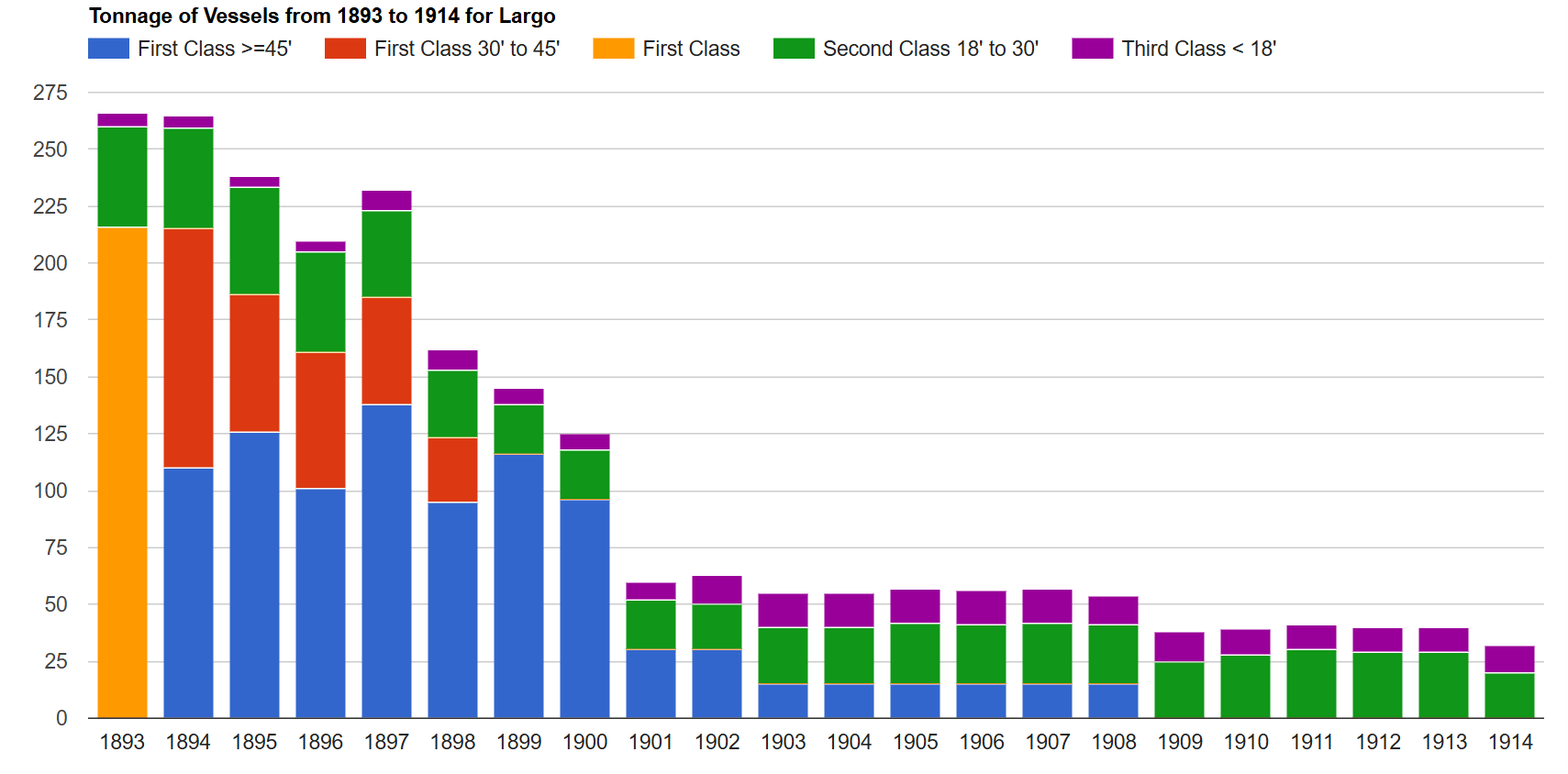
Tonnage of vessels

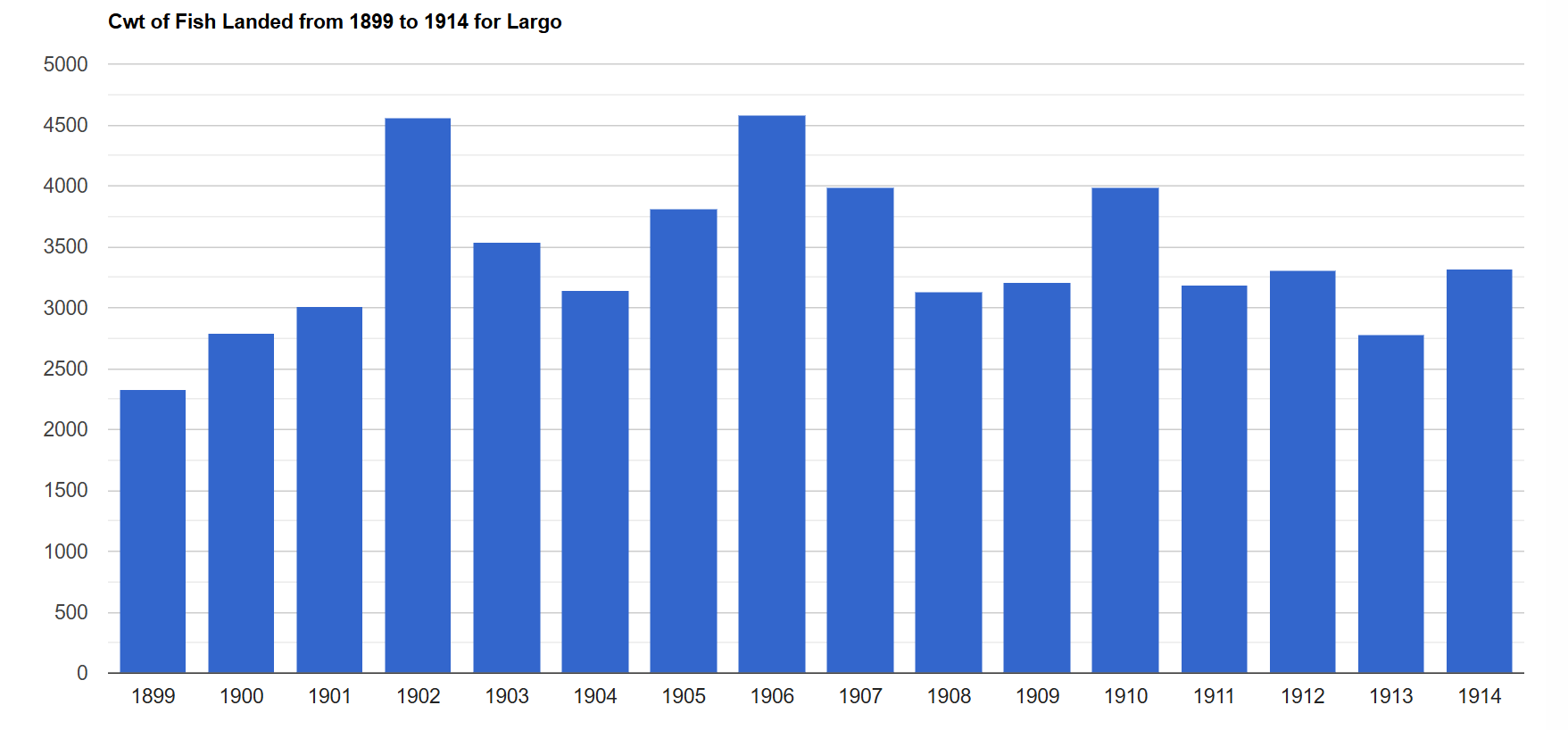
Cwt of fish landed

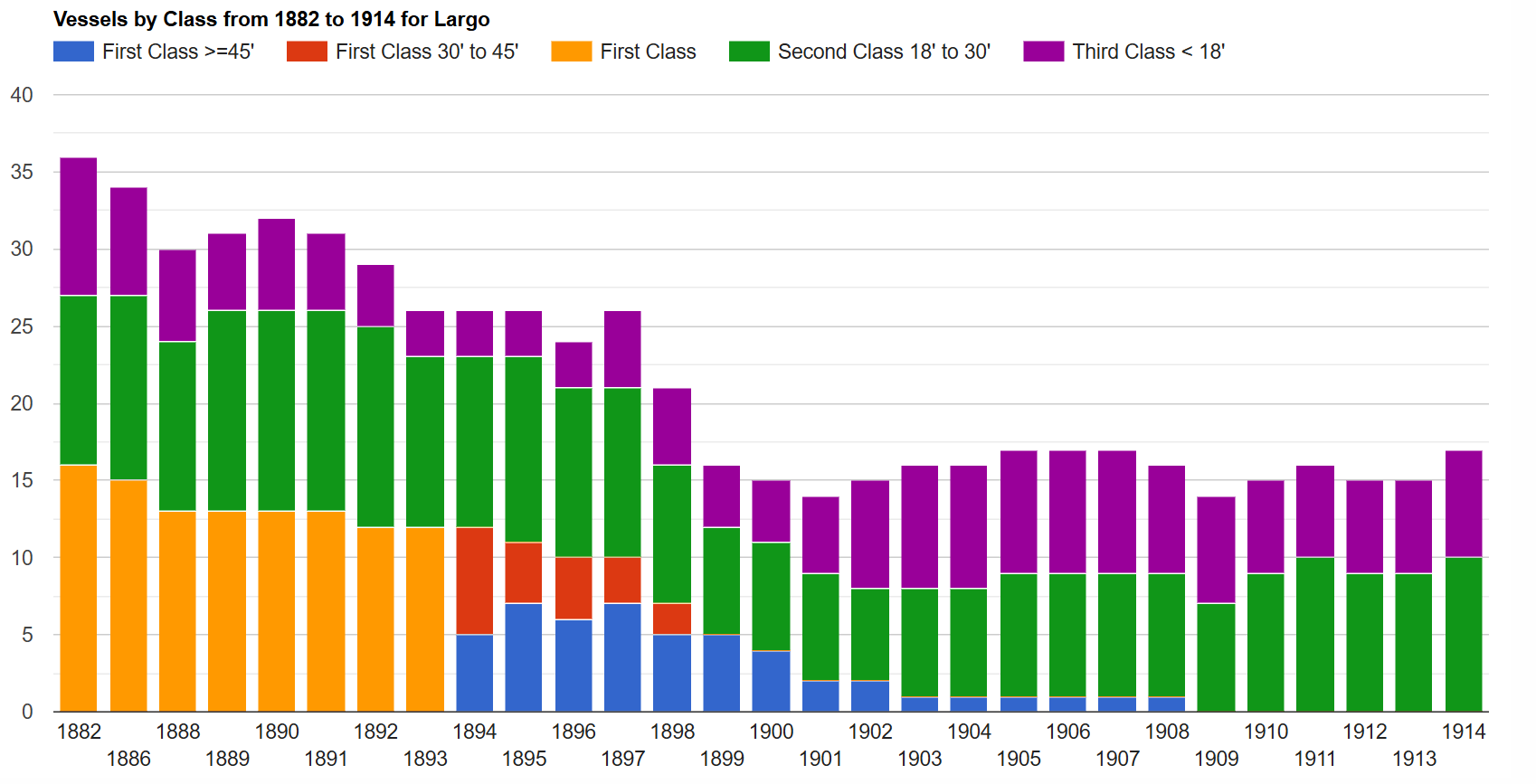
Vessels by class

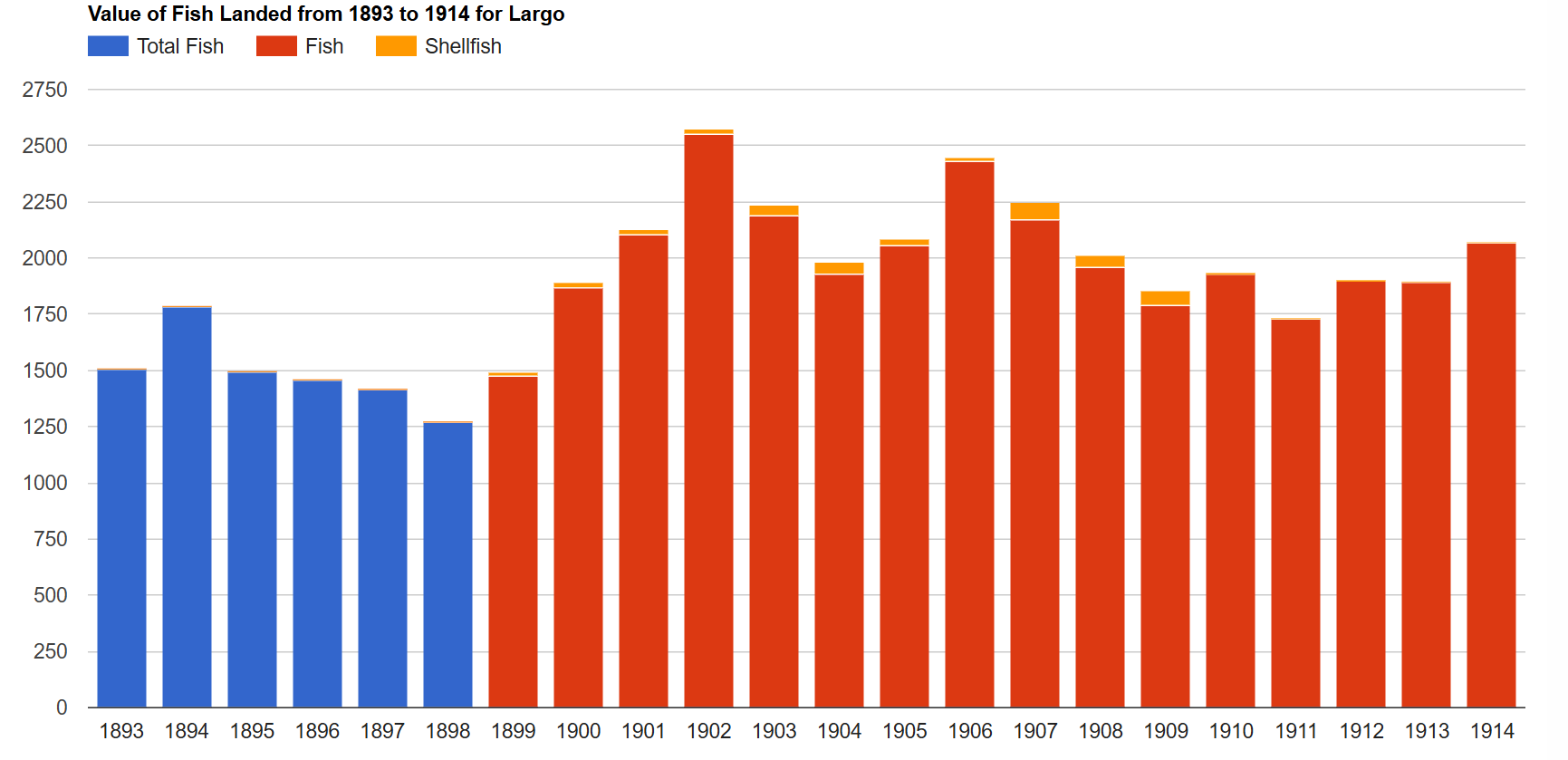
Value (£) of fish landed

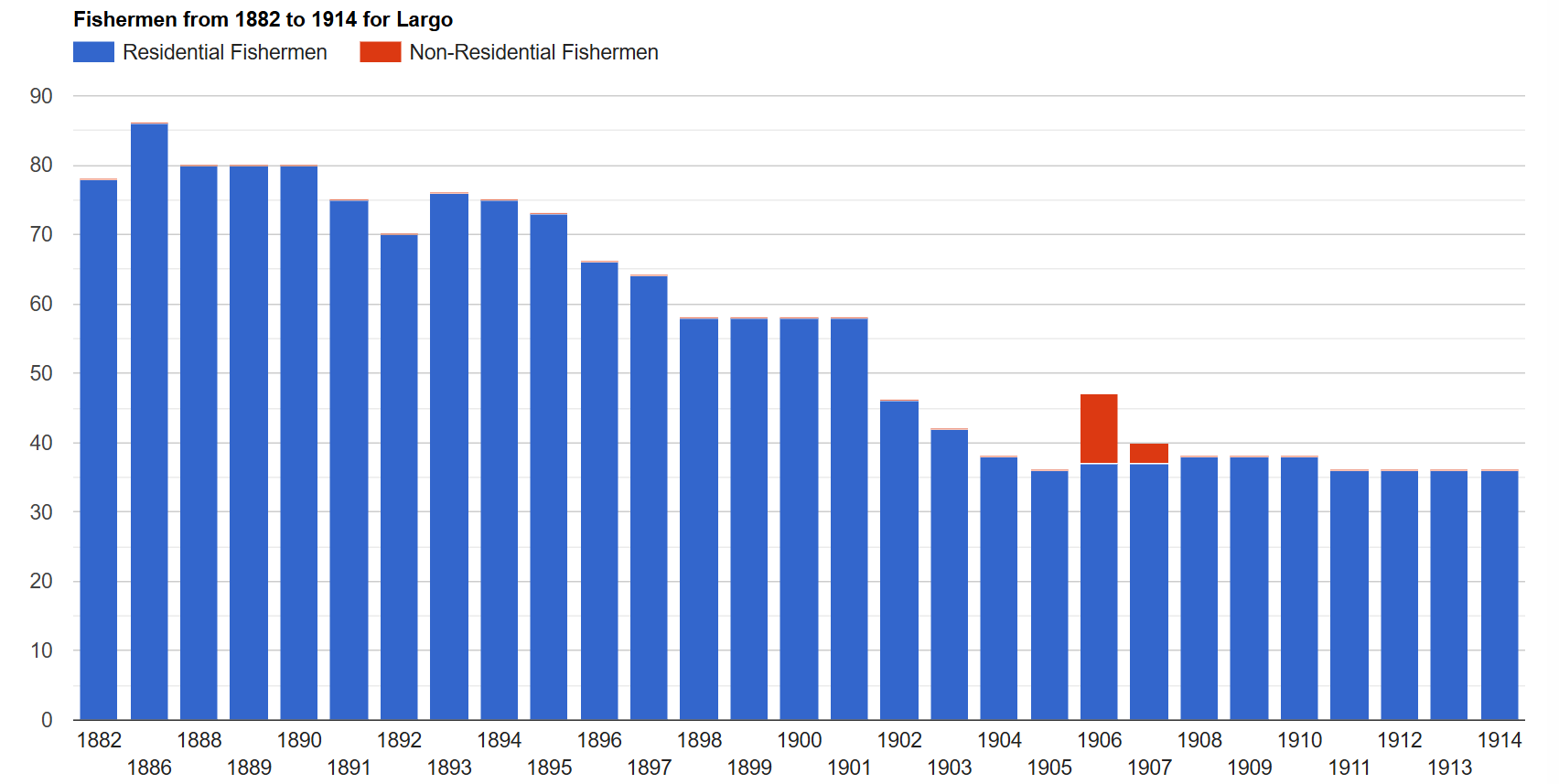
Fishermen

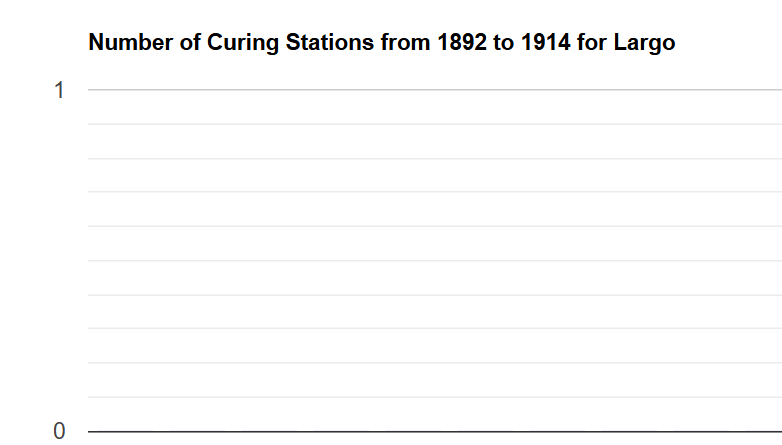
Placeholder-no curing stations

== Other notable residents ==
- James Clunie, British Labour Party politician
- Rev Joseph Taylor Goodsir FRSE, theological author, born in Lower Largo and later its minister
