= Francis Brodie Imlach =

19th-century Scottish dental pioneer

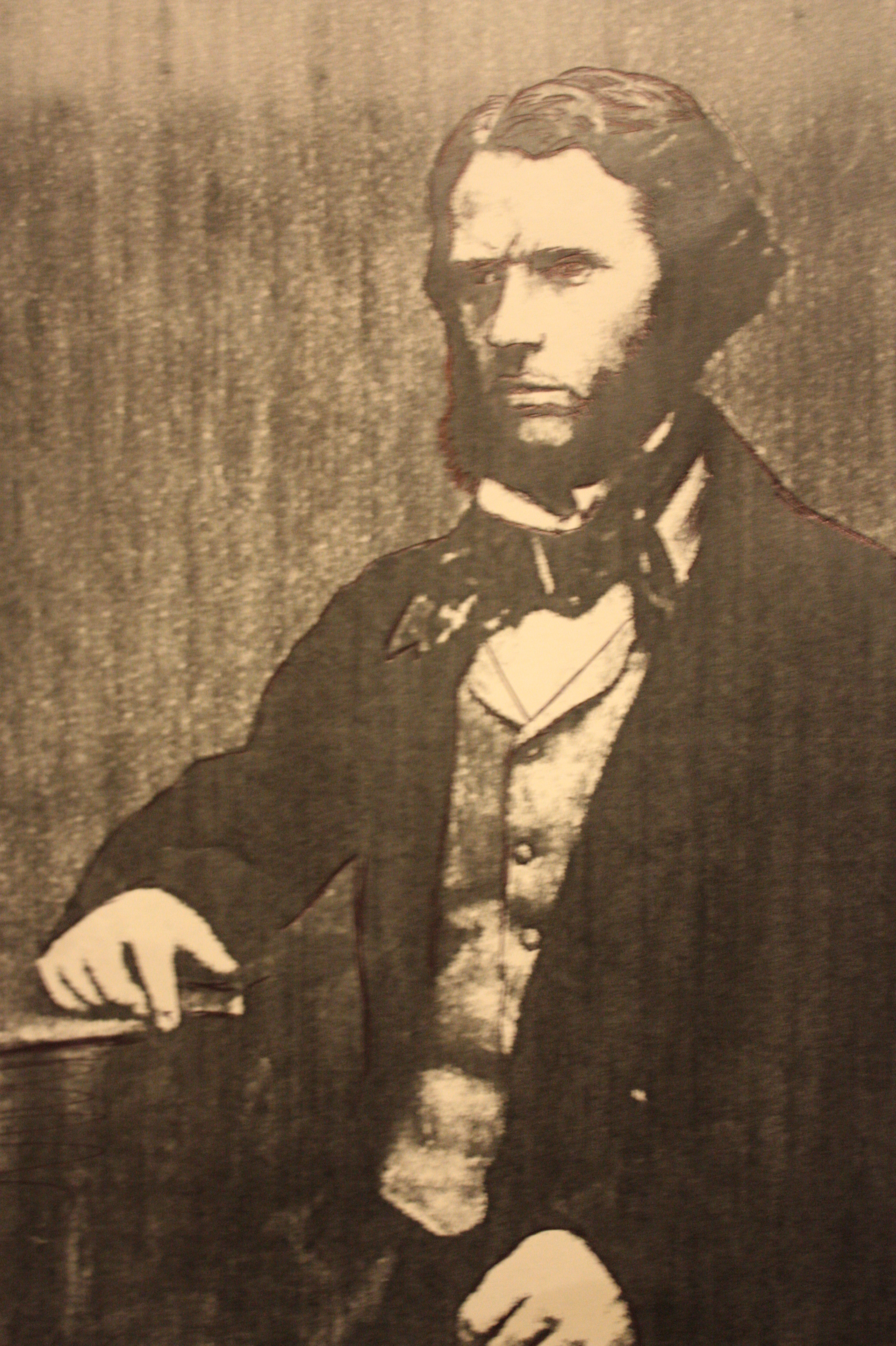
Francis Brodie Imlach c.1860 (ink sketch)

Imlach in later life

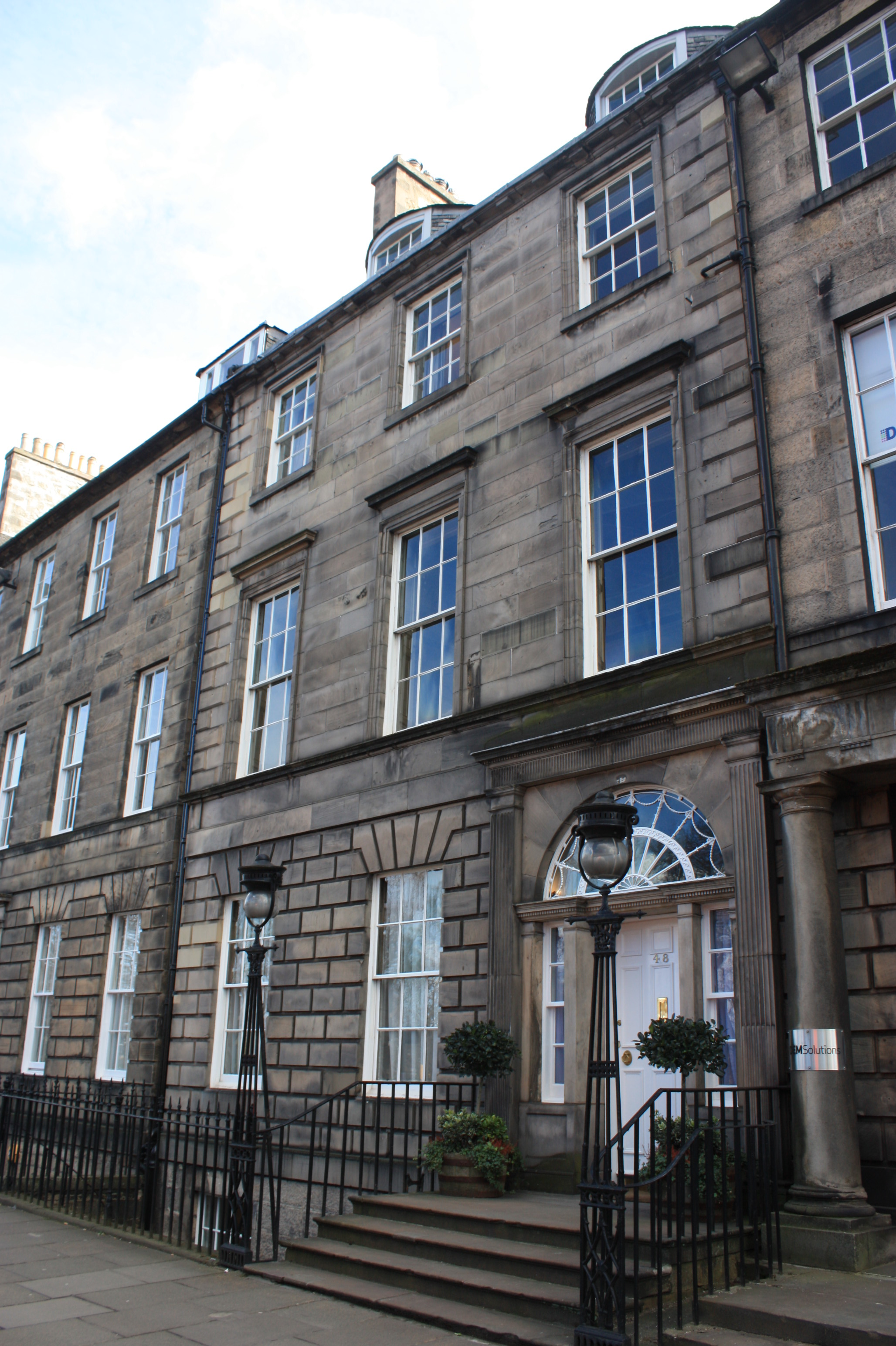
48 Queen Street, Edinburgh, the offices of Francis Brodie Imlach

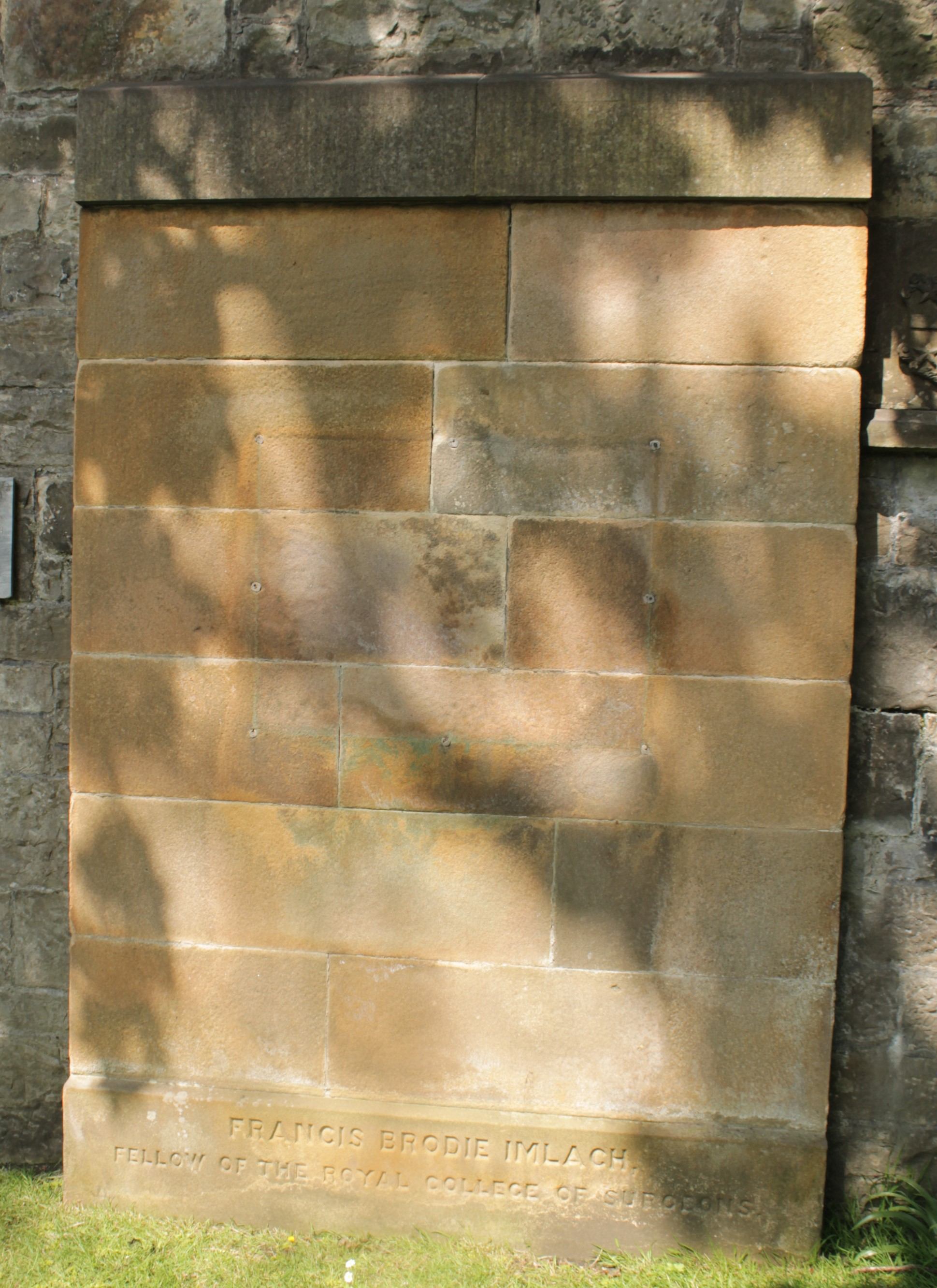
The grave of Francis Brodie Imlach, lower terrace Dean Cemetery

Francis Brodie Imlach FRCSEd (1819-1891) was a Scottish pioneer of modern dentistry, and the first person to use chloroform on a dental patient. He helped to raise the profile of dentistry from a back street trade to full professional status.

== Life ==
Born in Edinburgh in 1819, he was the son of George Imlach WS, an Edinburgh lawyer, with offices at 10 St Andrew Square. He became a licentiate of the Royal College of Surgeons in 1841, and a Fellow in 1856. He thereafter acted as an examiner to students.

In 1860, together with Dr John Smith and Dr Robert Orphoot he co-founded the Edinburgh Dental Dispensary at 1 Drummond Street.

He had his main dental practice at 48 Queen Street, a few doors away from James Young Simpson's offices at 52 Queen Street.

At that time he was one of only two dentists to become President of the Royal College of Surgeons in Edinburgh (RCSE). He served from 1879 to 1881. In 1881 he was also elected a member of the Aesculapian Club. He also served as President of the Royal Scottish Society of the Arts 1887-89.

== Positions of Note ==
- Manager of the Dean Orphanage
- Manager of the Edinburgh Royal Lunatic Asylum in Morningside (commonly known just as the "Royal Edinburgh").
- President of the Royal Scottish Society of Arts
- Member of the Royal Company of Archers
- Church Elder at St. Stephens Church in Stockbridge

== Introduction of chloroform ==
Whilst James Young Simpson is credited with the first use of chloroform on a human, he did not invent it. Simpson’s first such use on 4 November 1847, was on himself and two doctor friends, at a dinner party. This was followed 4 days later by Simpson’s first use on a patient, Wilhelmina Carstairs, the daughter of a doctor. Imlach holds the claim to being the first to use chloroform in a dental context. On the afternoon of 11 November 1847 he used it to help extract a tooth of fellow dentist, James Darsie Morrison.

== Death ==
He collapsed while walking on 24 December 1891 and died before reaching hospital.

He is buried on the southern lower terrace of Dean Cemetery, towards its eastern end. The large bronze plaque to his memory has been stolen.

== Publications ==
- ’’On the Employment of Chloroform in Dental Surgery’’ (1848)

== Family ==
He married Marion Ainslie and they had a daughter Agnes Campbell Imlach (1849-1916) who became a portrait artist of note, and several sons, including Archibald Francis Imlach (1852-1903). Archibald Francis Imlach is buried on the north side of the Dean Cemetery with his daughter Marion Ainslie Imlach.
