= John Dewar =

John Dewar may refer to:

- Dewar's Scotch Whisky, made by John Dewar & Sons
- John Dewar (academic) (born 1959), Vice-Chancellor of La Trobe University
- John Dewar Sr. (1805–1880), founder of John Dewar & Sons
- John Dewar, 1st Baron Forteviot (1856–1929), son of John Dewar, Sr.
- John Dewar, 2nd Baron Forteviot (1885–1947), Scottish businessman and soldier
- John Dewar (RAF officer) (1907–1940), World War II Royal Air Force fighter pilot
- John A. Dewar (1863–1945), farmer and political figure on Prince Edward Island
- John Michael Dewar (1883–1941), British gynaecologist and ornithologist
- John Dewar (MP) (1740s–1795), British politician
