= Morningside Cemetery, Edinburgh =

Cemetery in City of Edinburgh, Scotland

Coordinates: 55°55′28″N 3°12′51″W

Morningside Cemetery
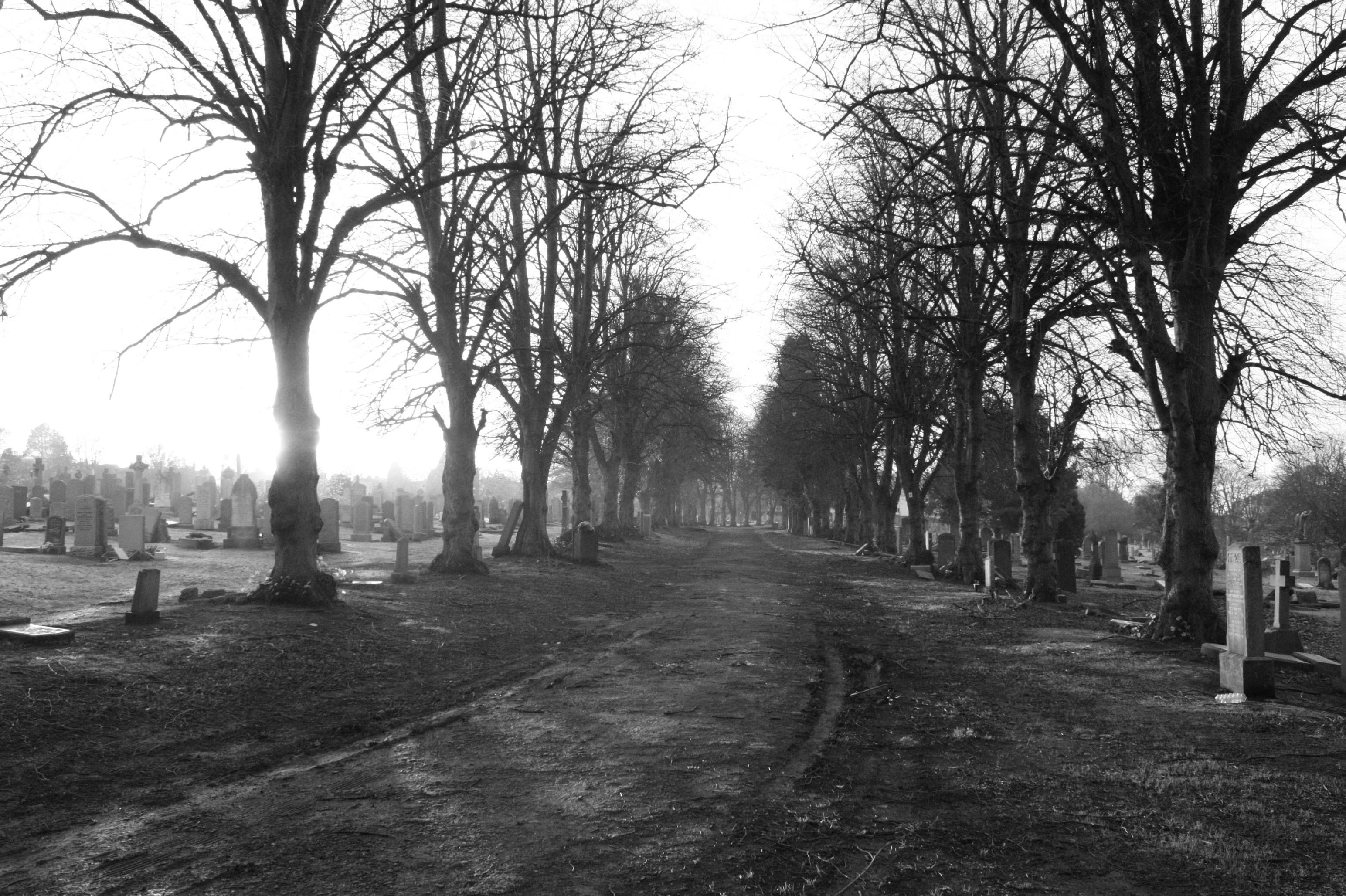
- The central avenue, Morningside Cemetery, Edinburgh
- Interactive map of Morningside Cemetery

Details
- Established: 1878
- Location: Morningside, Edinburgh
- Country: Scotland
- Type: Public
- Owned by: City of Edinburgh Council

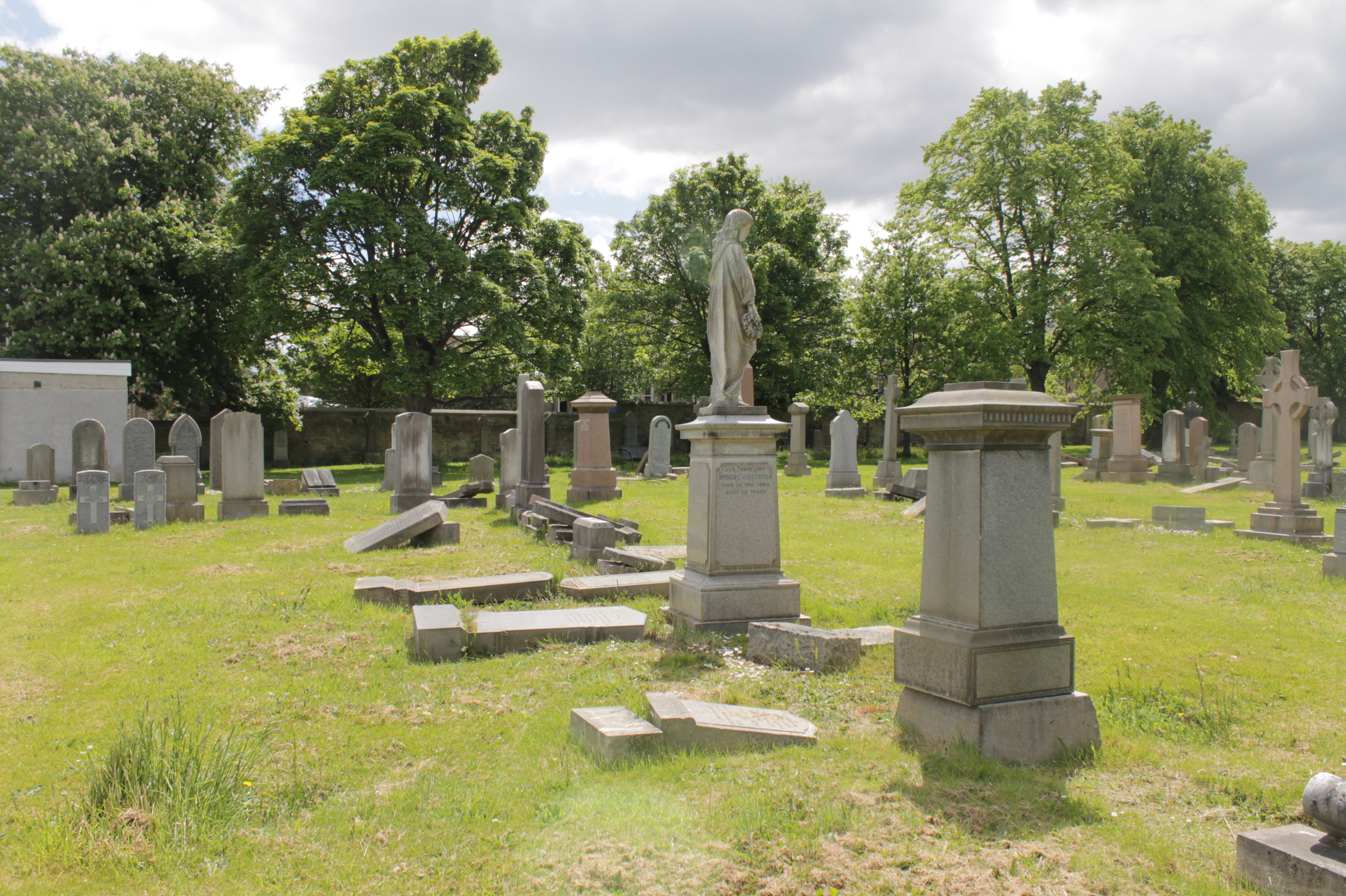
Morningside Cemetery, Edinburgh 2021

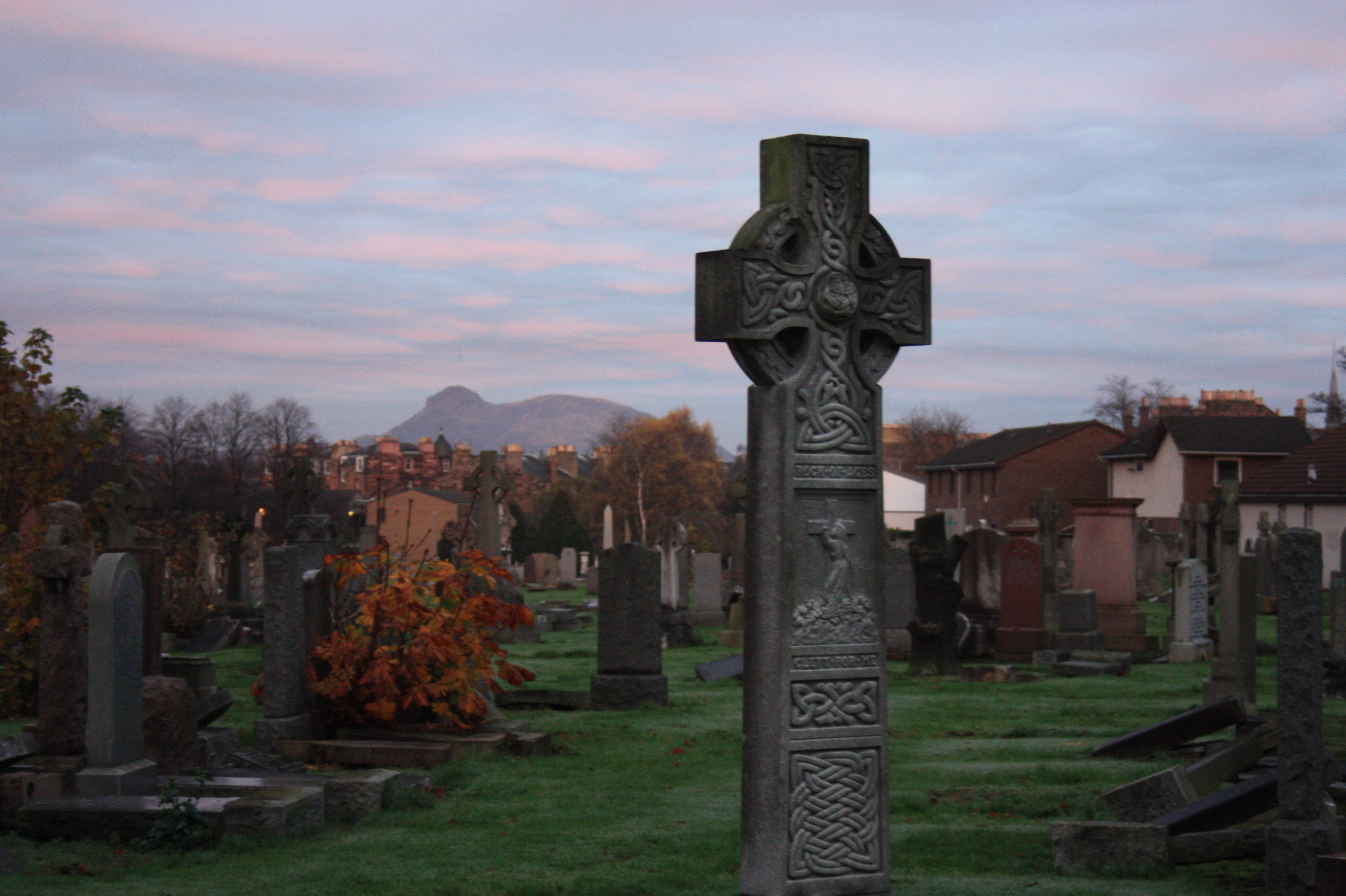
Morningside Cemetery looking east to Arthur's Seat

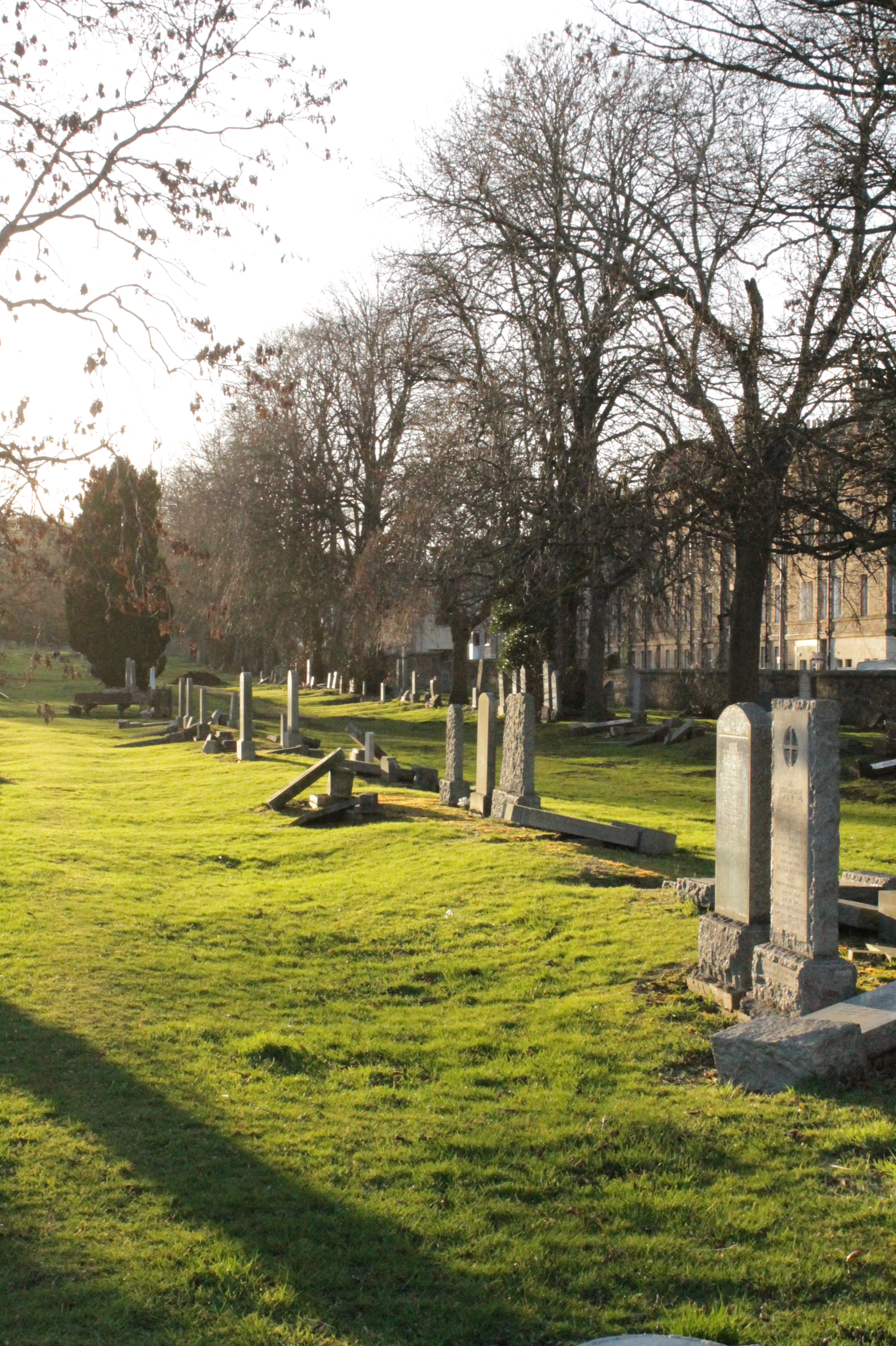
North section, Morningside Cemetery

Morningside Cemetery is a cemetery in south Edinburgh. It was established in 1878 by the Metropolitan Cemetery Company, originally just outwith the then city boundary, the nearest suburb then being Morningside. It extends to just over 13 acres in area. The cemetery contains 81 war graves. The cemetery contains the graves of several important female figures; including a female air commandant, Scotland's first female surgeon, the first female Fellow of the Royal College of Physicians of Edinburgh, and many church missionaries. Sir Edward Victor Appleton GBE KCB FRS (6 September 1892 – 21 April 1965) who was an English physicist, Nobel Prize winner (1947) and pioneer in radiophysics is also buried here.

== History ==
The cemetery was soon enveloped by the city and now lies between Balcarres Street (to its north) and Morningside Drive (to its south). Its original entrance was very grand. This was off Belhaven Terrace to the east. However, although the entrance gates and railings still exist, this route is now blocked, a modern housing development, Belhaven Place, standing over the graveyard, in defiance of cemetery legislation. This is not the sole loss of ground: Balcarres Court has been built to the north-west; Morningside Court to the south-west; and numerous blocks have been added along most of Morningside Drive. This leaves the cemetery detached from its surroundings, hard to access, and seriously compromised in terms of its design integrity.

The developments, essentially asset-stripping in relation to the original Cemetery Company, represent a period of private ownership between the original Cemetery Company ownership and compulsory purchase by the City of Edinburgh Council in February 1992.

== Layout ==
The overall layout is broadly rectilinear but with a slight curve on its east–west axis. There is a general drop in ground levels from south to north giving an overall form of a shallow amphitheatre.

Apart from a central avenue of trees on the main east–west path the landscape is undramatic and unstructured, and lacks the atmosphere of its predecessors, such as Dean Cemetery.

The overall distribution of stones is spartan, especially towards the north. Larger monuments tend to lie to the south-west. One section lies almost detached, to the south-east, accessed through a pathway between the modern housing developments, isolated as an ignoble peninsula. The local Morningside Library has an index which can be used to locate specific stones.

== Current operation ==
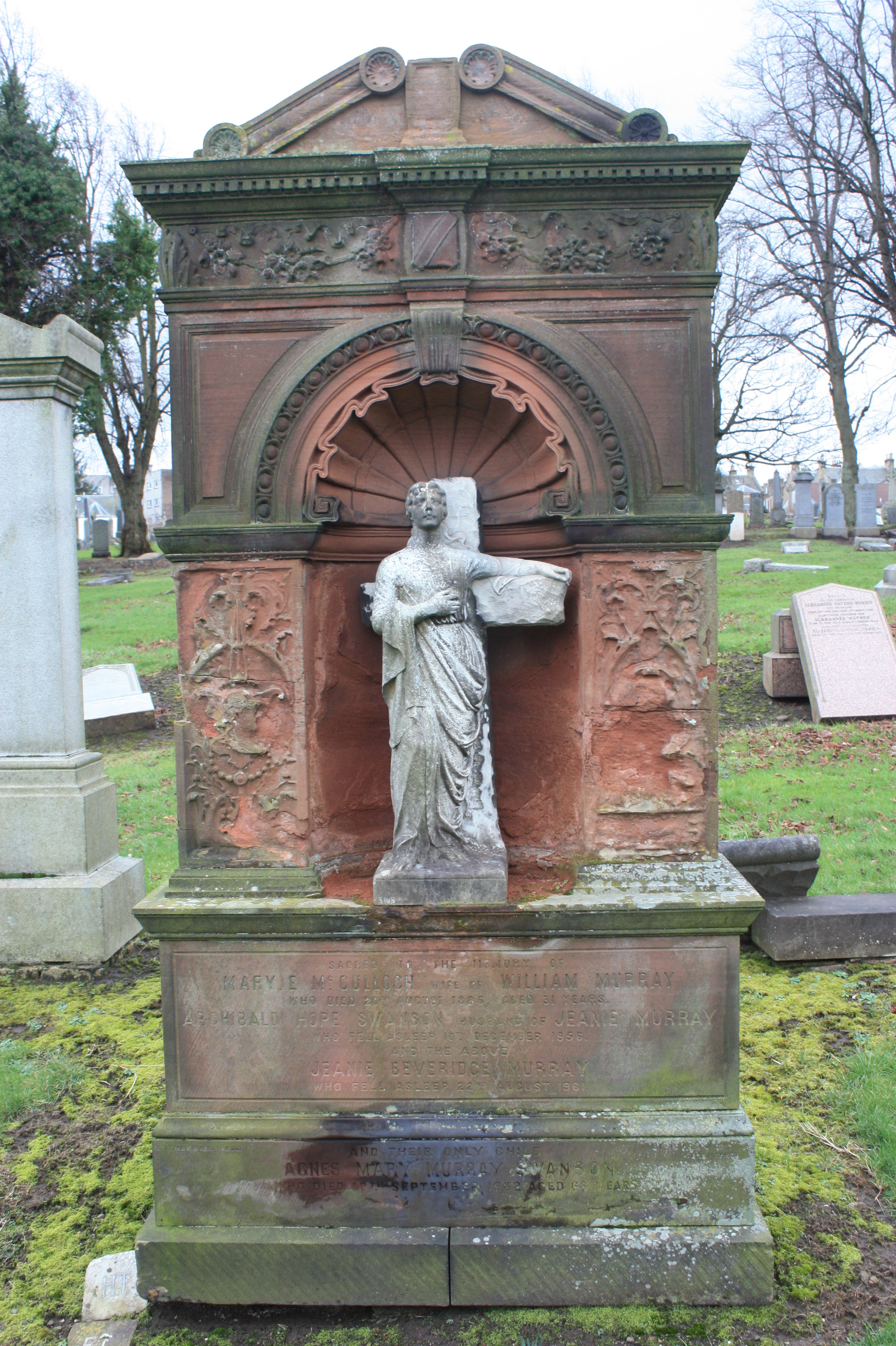
The McCulloch-Murray monument by Thomas P. Marwick (1886) Morningside Cemetery, Edinburgh

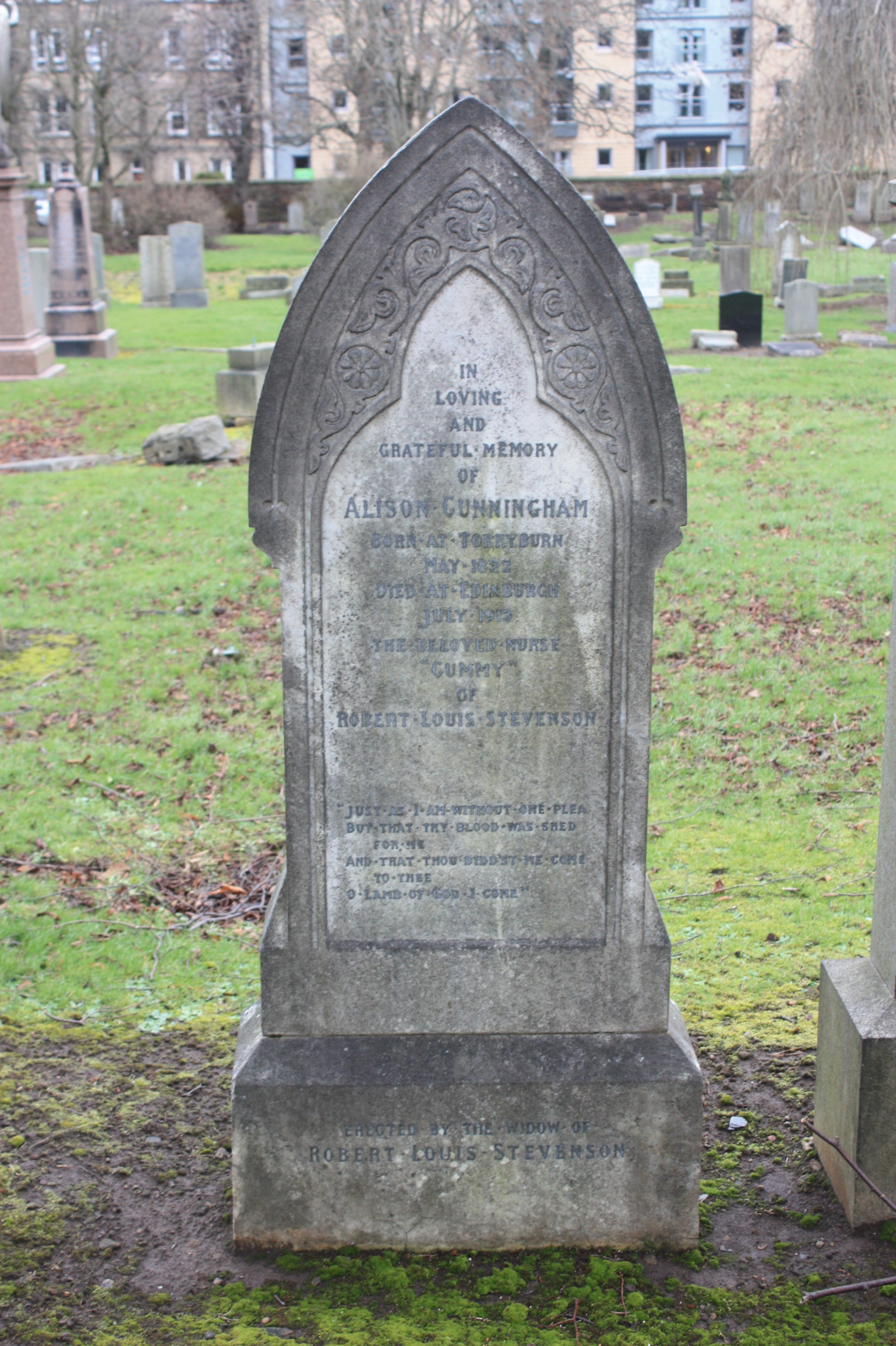
Alison Cunningham's grave, Morningside Cemetery, Edinburgh

Morningside is one of the few city cemeteries to be open 24 hours per day. This has both advantages and disadvantages; exposing it to vandalism during unsocial hours. Edinburgh Council has a policy of knocking down unsafe gravestones, so many of them are broken and lying askew. There is a Friends of Morningside Cemetery group who meet weekly to look after the cemetery.

The cemetery remains open to burials and interment of ashes. Style of monument is not controlled.

== War graves ==
The cemetery is an official Commonwealth War Grave Cemetery containing 49 war graves from World War I and 32 from World War II. The dead largely represent those dying of wounds following repatriation, linking to the nearby City Hospital. The Cross of Remembrance stands in the north-east section of the cemetery.

Two war graves are of female victims (both from the ATS): Margaret White Walker (1922-1945) and Jean Dewar Scougall (1921-1943).

== Notable interments ==
- Mary Aitken (died 1918) member of Women's Royal Air Force in First World War. Possibly the only war grave with this rare link
- Prof Rev William Menzies Alexander (1858–1929), academic, theologian, Moderator of the Free Church of Scotland 1911/12
- Alexander John ("Jack") Travers Allan (1879-1898), golfer
- Sir Edward Victor Appleton (1892–1965), physicist, winner of the 1947 Nobel Prize for Physics
- Isabella Mears LRCPE (1854-1936) early female doctor, mother of Frank Mears
- Stanley Booth-Clibborn (1924-1996) Bishop of Manchester (cremated ashes)
- John Breingan (1857-1930), architect
- William Gordon Brown (1895-1916), mathematician killed in the First World War (memorial only)
- Alexander Low Bruce (1839–1893) entrepreneur
- Dr Grace Ross Cadell (1855-1918) and Martha Georgina Isabella Cadell (1858-1905) suffragette sisters who were two of Britain's first female doctors
- Rev Henry Calderwood (1830–1897) minister and academic
- Air Commandant Dame Helen Cargill (1896-1969) (stone fallen)
- Ralph Copeland (1837–1905) astronomer
- Alison Cunningham (1822-1913) Robert Louis Stevenson's nanny, referred to as "Cummy" in his books
- Prof Alexander Darroch (1862-1924) educationalist
- Dr John Michael Dewar FRSE (1883-1941) gynaecologist and ornithologist
- Alexander Scott Dodd FRSE (1885-1964) Edinburgh city analyst
- Campbell Douglas (1828–1910), architect
- Thomas Noble Foulis (1878-1943) publisher (stone fallen)
- James Geikie FRS (1839–1915), geologist
- George Whitton Johnstone RSA RSW (1849–1901) artist
- Dr Claude Buchanan Ker (1867-1925) physician and medical author
- The Very Rev Prof Daniel Lamont (1870–1950), Moderator of the Church of Scotland 1936/7
- Jessie Lennox (1830-1933) oldest occupant of the cemetery, and friend of Florence Nightingale and David Livingstone
- Prof George Lichtenstein (1827–1893) Hungarian-born musician
- Lonsdale McAll (1870-1937) medical missionary at Yale-in-China
- Hannah MacGoun RSW (1864-1913) artist
- Sir Atholl MacGregor (1883-1945) law lord
- Prof James Gordon MacGregor FRS FRSE (1851-1913) physicist
- Prof W. J. M. Mackenzie (1909-1996)
- Prof Hugh Mackintosh (1870–1936) theologian
- John McLachan (1843–1893), architect
- Rev Prof Hugh Baillie MacLean (1910-1959) controversial minister
- Thomas Forbes MacLennan (1873-1957) architect
- Lord William Reginald MacLeod of the Highland Light Infantry (d.1904) plaque by William Grant Stevenson
- John MacRae (1836-1893) civil engineer who worked on the early stages of the Suez Canal
- Very Rev Alexander Mair (1834-1911) final Moderator of the United Presbyterian Church of Scotland and his son Prof Alexander William Mair (1875-1928) scholar of Greek and academic author
- Thomas P. Marwick (1854–1927), architect
- Dr Robert Charles Menzies FRSE (1887-1972) chemist
- John Douglas Michie (1830-1895), artist (stone fallen)
- Margret Isabel Mitchell (1920-2016) pioneer nurse educator in Africa and Middle East for the World Health Organisation
- Harriet E. Moore (d.1919) monument by her grandson Pilkington Jackson
- Robert Morham (1839-1912) city architect
- Very Rev Pearson McAdam Muir DD (1846-1924) of Glasgow Cathedral, Moderator of the General Assembly of the Church of Scotland 1910
- Captain Granville Toup Nicolas RN (1832-1894) son of Admiral John Toup Nicolas
- William Thomas Oldrieve HRSA FRIBA (1853-1922) architect (stone fallen)
- Prof Hugh Bryan Nisbet FRSE (1902-1969) First Principal of Heriot-Watt University (stone fallen)
- Ben Peach FRS FRSE (1842-1926) geologist (stone inaccessible)
- George Pearson (1876-1928) astronomer, Fellow of the Royal Astronomical Society (stone fallen)
- Dr Isabella Pringle (1876-1963) first female Fellow of the Royal College of Physicians of Edinburgh
- Andrew Seth Pringle-Pattison (1856–1931), philosopher
- David Robertson (architect) (1834-1925) (stone fallen)
- James Logie Robertson (1846–1922) poet (under the pen-name of Hugh Haliburton)
- J. H. Ronaldson (1858-1935) geologist and mining engineer
- James Kirkwood Slater FRSE OBE (1900-1975) physician
- Gourlay Steell RSA (1819–1894) artist (stone fallen)
- Harold Thomas Swan (1922-2011) haematologist
- Dr Johnson Symington FRS FRSE FZS (1851-1924) anatomist
- George Hunter MacThomas Thoms FRSE (1831-1903) Sheriff of Orkney and Shetland, funder of the restoration of St Giles Cathedral
- Andrew Tod (1819-1898) sculpted by D.A.Tod
- Andrew Wilson (zoologist) FRSE (1852-1912) zoologist and author (stone fallen)
- Very Rev James Hood Wilson DD (1829-1903) Moderator of the General Assembly of the Free Church of Scotland 1895
- John Wilson (1844-1909) founder of the Edinburgh Evening News
- Alexander Waugh Young (1836-1915) classical scholar and author
