= George Whitton Johnstone =

Scottish artist (1849–1901)

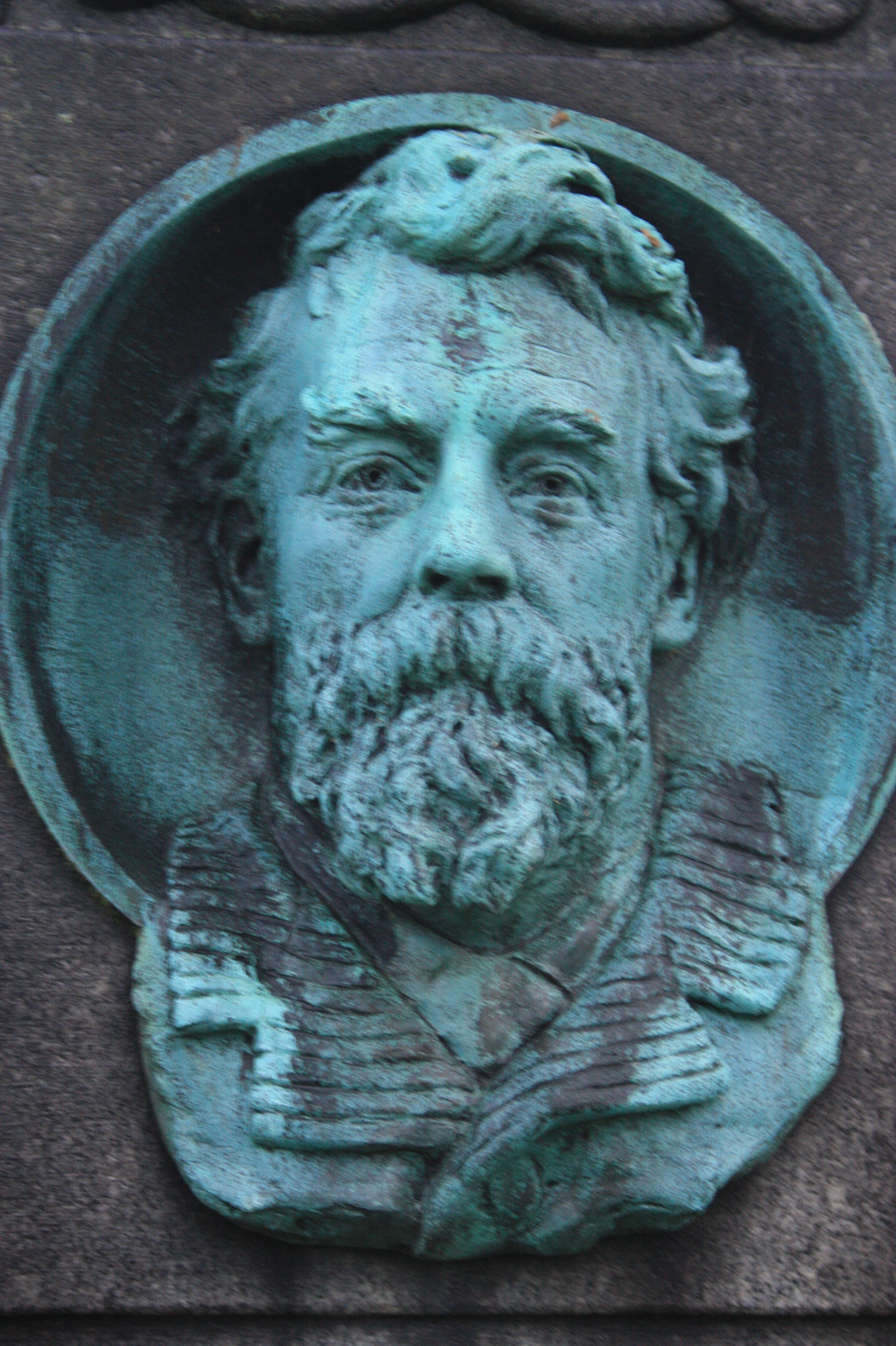
George Whitton Johnstone (detail)

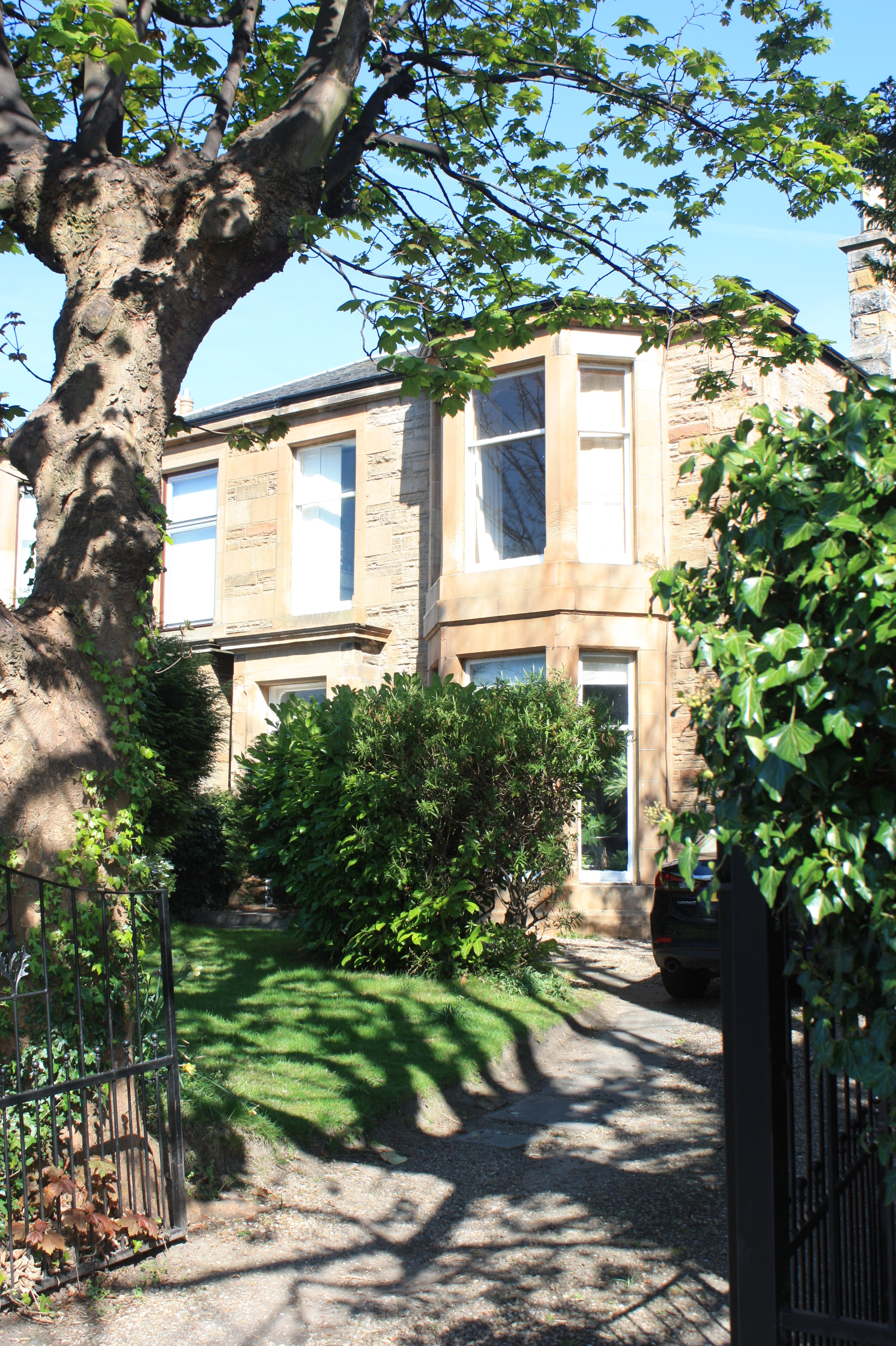
Johnstone's house at 4 Napier Road, Edinburgh

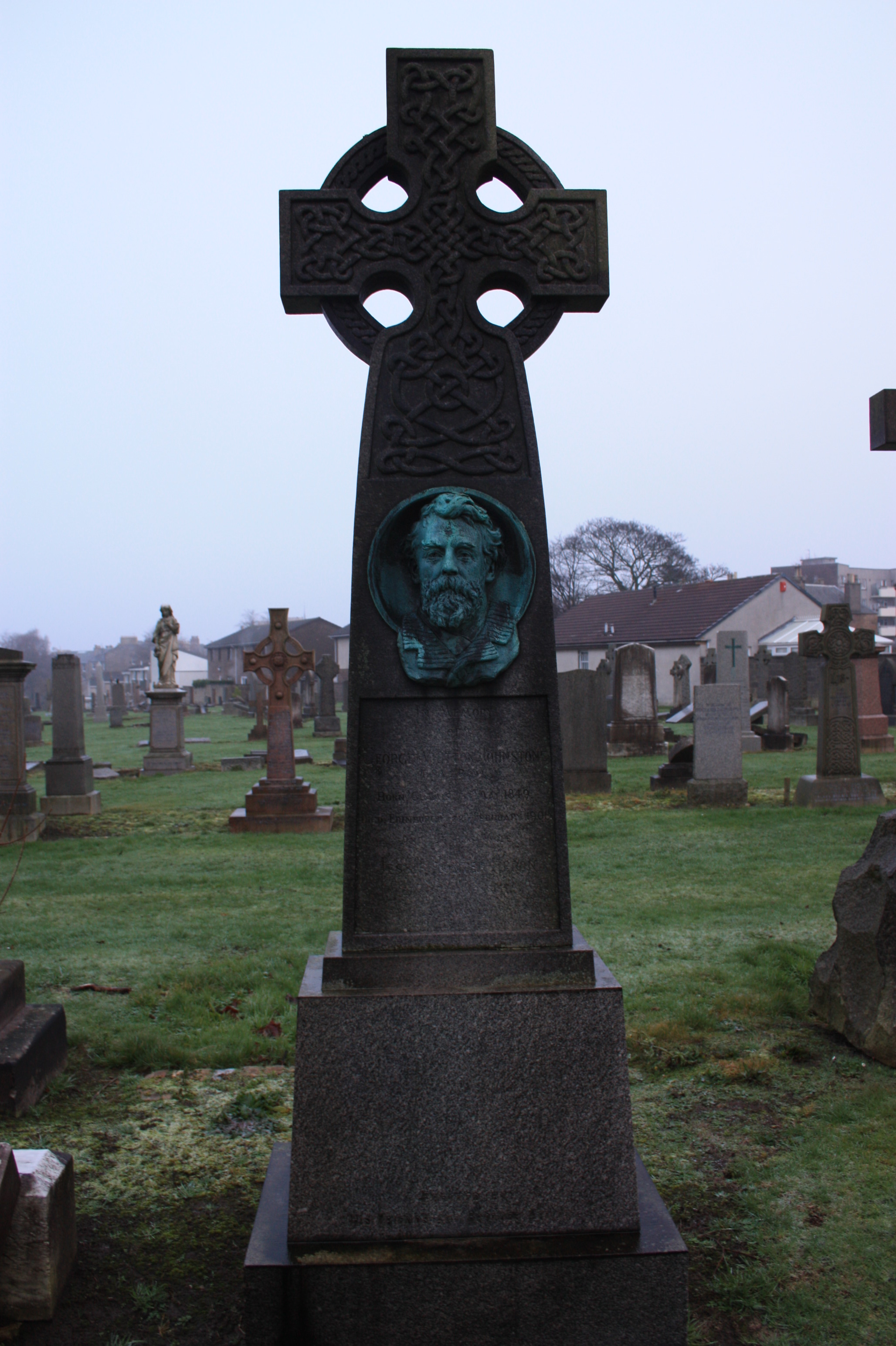
The grave of George Whitton Johnstone, Morningside Cemetery, Edinburgh

George Whitton Johnstone RSA RSW (3 May 1849 – 22 February 1901) was a 19th-century Scottish artist.

== Life ==
Johnstone was born in Glamis on 3 May 1849, the sixth of seven children.

He was a full member of the Royal Scottish Academy and Royal Society of Watercolourists and demonstrated particular skill with landscapes and portraits. His first exhibition at the RSA was in 1872 and he continued to exhibit regularly. He became an Associate of the RSA in 1883, and a full member in 1895. He also exhibited at the Royal Academy of Arts from 1885 to 1892. He painted mainly in Eskdale and Annandale, though he also painted in France's Fontainebleau forest. He was apparently influenced by the famous artist Jean-Baptiste-Camille Corot.

He lived at 4 Napier Road in the Merchiston area of Edinburgh. His daughter Dorothy Johnstone was an artist who married David Macbeth Sutherland in 1924.

He died in Edinburgh and was buried in Morningside Cemetery, Edinburgh with his wife Jessie Hunter Heron. The distinctive grave holds a high relief sculpture of his head and lies in the south-west section of the cemetery.

== Public works ==
see

- The Falls of Tummel, Dundee Art Gallery and Museum (two views)
- Landscape, Dundee Art Gallery and Museum
- Spring Time in Dalmeny Woods, Fife Council
- A Burnside, Smith Art Gallery and Museum, Stirling
- Lake of Menteith, Smith Art Gallery and Museum, Stirling
- Where the Burnie runs into the Sea, Royal Scottish Academy
- Dunlappie Ford, Edzell, Paisley Art Gallery and Museum
