= J. H. Ronaldson =

Scottish geologist and mining engineer

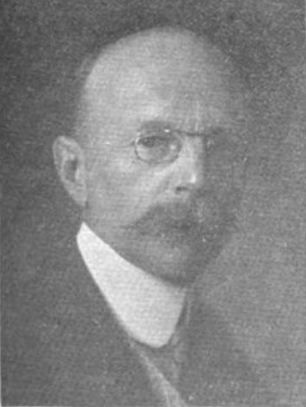
- Born: James Henry Ronaldson; 1858; East Lothian, Scotland
- Died: 5 August 1935 (aged 76–77)
- Education: University of Edinburgh; University of Liège
- Occupations: Geologist, mining engineer
- Spouse: Jane Brodie Ronaldson

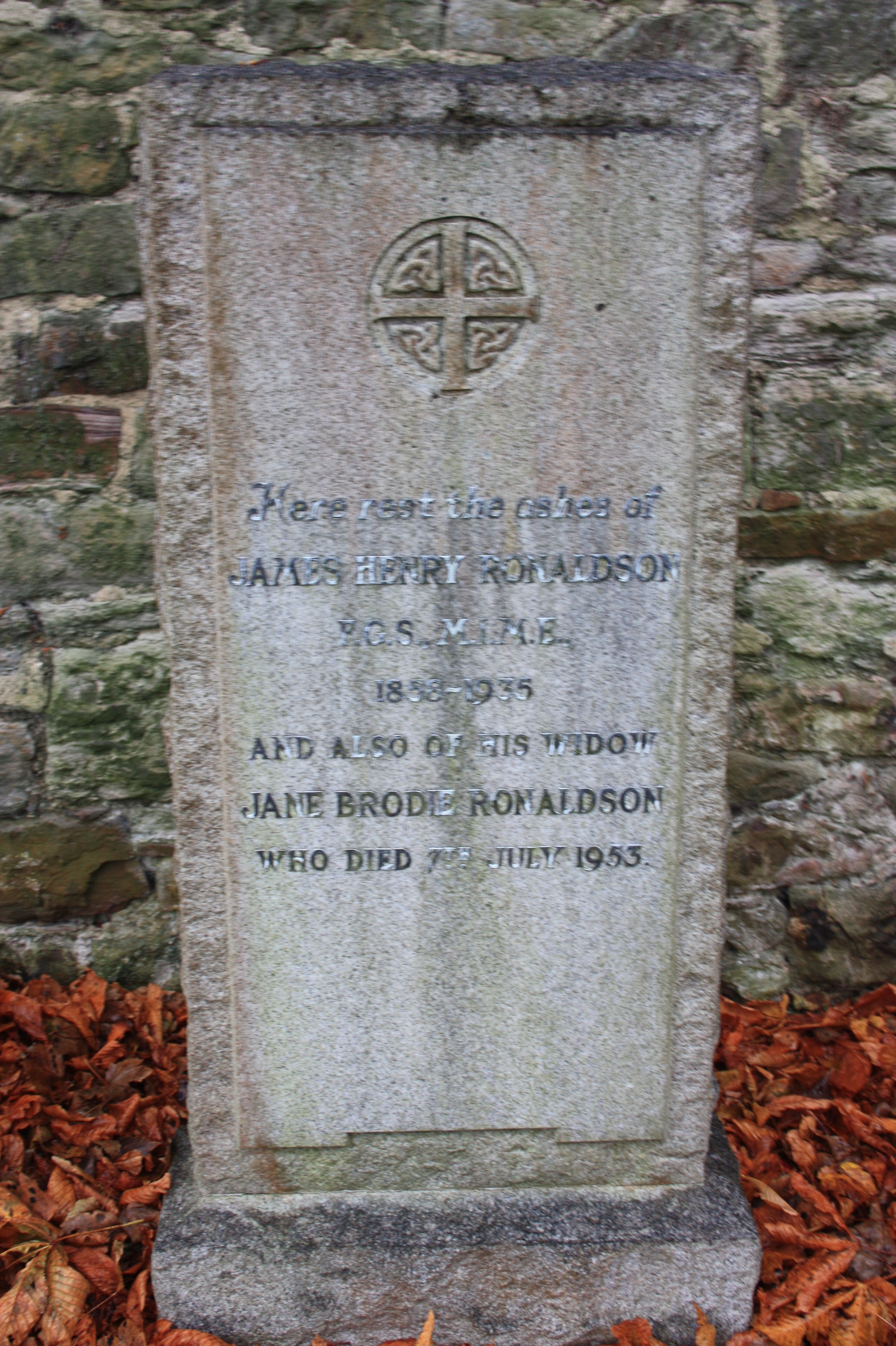
The grave of James Henry Ronaldson, Morningside Cemetery

James Henry Ronaldson FGS MIME (1858 – 5 August 1935) was a 19th/20th century Scottish geologist and mining engineer. He is mainly remembered for his best-selling book, Coal.

== Life ==
He was born in East Lothian. He studied science at the University of Edinburgh and then mining engineering at the University of Liège in Belgium. Qualifying as a mining engineer, he did much work in both Australia and South Africa.

In Australia, he lived in New South Wales and was involved in coal mining.

In 1892, he became a member of the Institute of Mining Engineers.

From 1910, he lived in London.

In the First World War, he was employed by the Ministry of Munitions producing explosives. He was sent to Brotherton & Co in Leeds to oversee production of explosives.

He died on 5 August 1935 and is buried in Morningside Cemetery, Edinburgh. The grave lies on the outer south-west wall.

== Publications ==
- Coal (1920)

== Family ==
He was married to Jane Brodie Ronaldson (died 1953).
