= Hugh Mackintosh =

Scottish theologian (1870–1936)

Hugh Mackintosh Moderator of the General Assembly
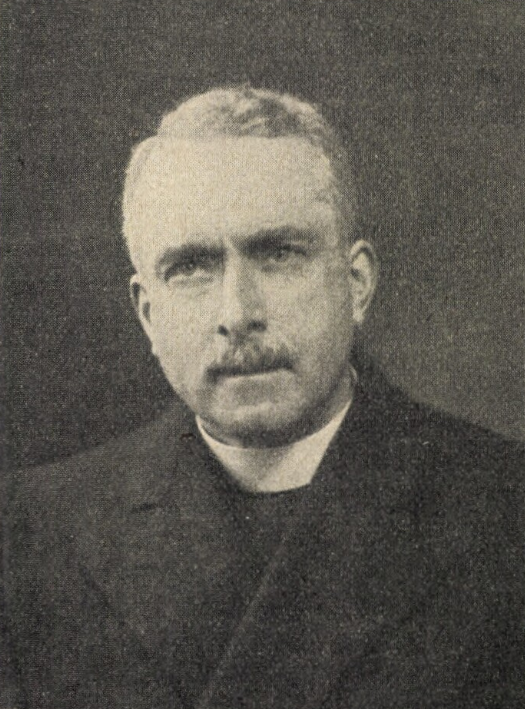
- Mackintosh in 1933
- Church: Church of Scotland
- In office: 1932–1933

Personal details
- Born: Hugh Ross Mackintosh; 31 October 1870 Paisley, Renfrewshire, Scotland
- Died: 8 June 1936 (aged 65) Stornoway, Scotland
- Buried: Morningside Cemetery
- Spouse: Jessie Air (m. 1899)
- Children: 4
- Occupation: Theologian; minister
- Education: University of Edinburgh

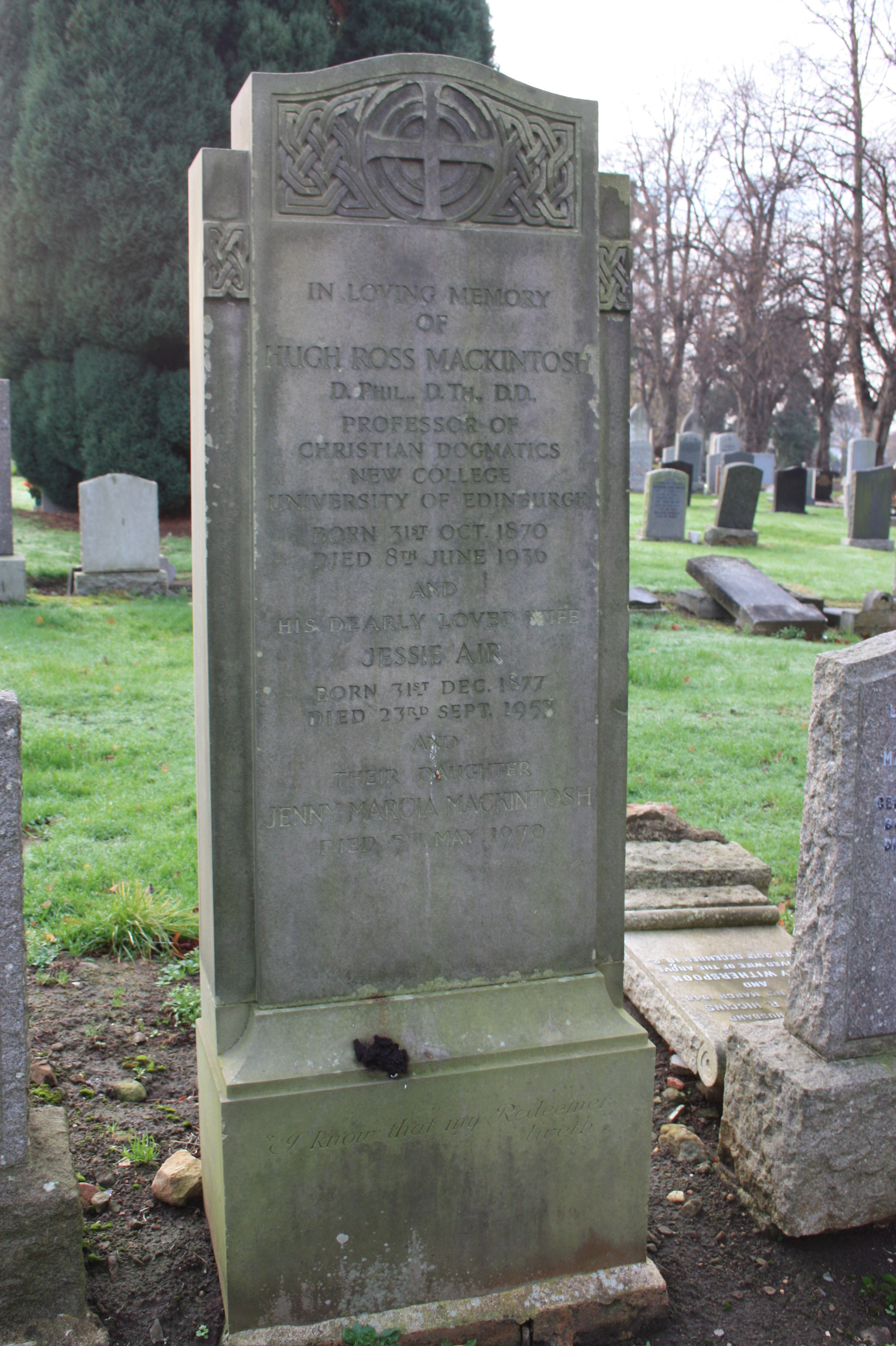
The grave of Hugh Ross Mackintosh, Morningside Cemetery, Edinburgh

Hugh Ross Mackintosh (31 October 1870 – 8 June 1936) was a Scottish theologian, and parish minister who served as Moderator of the General Assembly of the Church of Scotland in 1932.

== Early life and education ==
He was born in Paisley on 31 October 1870, where his father (Alexander Mackintosh who was married to Janet Ross) held the Free Church Gaelic charge; his parents died young and the Mackintosh children were raised by their aunt and her husband, who was the Free Church minister at Edderton, Ross-shire.

He attended the University of Edinburgh where he studied philosophy and classics; he then went on to the New College, Edinburgh to study divinity, as well as taking sessions at Freiburg, Halle and Marburg, where he became a particular friend of Wilhelm Herrmann.

His major theological work was his major study addressing the Person of Christ. He arrived at a kenotic doctrine of incarnation following his fellow Scot P. T. Forsyth. His other influential work was the 'Christian Experience of Forgiveness' which attempted to creatively restate the Protestant doctrines of justification and atonement. He argued that justification was forgiveness and that the cross was the cost of forgiveness to God. He also taught T. F. Torrance dogmatics (systematic theology).

== Career ==
He was ordained into the Free Church in 1897.

He was a Free Church minister at Tayport (1897–1901) and, following the creation of the United Free Church of Scotland in 1900, was the minister of Beechgrove Church in Aberdeen (U.F. Church) (1901–1904), before becoming professor of divinity at New College (1904–1936).

The Church of Scotland and the United Free Church of Scotland united in 1929. Mackintosh was elected Moderator of the General Assembly of the Church of Scotland in 1932.

== Personal life and death ==
Mackintosh married Jessie Air (1877–1951) on 8 June 1899 and they went on to have four children. In 1910 he was living at 81 Colinton Road in south-west Edinburgh.

He died on 8 June 1936 during a working visit to Stornaway. He is buried with his wife, in Morningside Cemetery, Edinburgh, towards the south-east.

His papers are held at the University of Edinburgh.

== Publications ==
- The Doctrine of the Person of Christ
- The Originality of the Christian Message
- Immortality and the Future of the Christian Doctrine of Eternal Life
- Selections from the Literature of Theism
- Types of Modern Theology
- The Christian Experience of Forgiveness
- God in Experience
- The Christian Apprehension of God
- Miracles and Christianity (with Johannes Wendland)
- Translation of Justification and Reconciliation
- Translation of Schleiermacher's The Christian Faith

== See also ==
- List of moderators of the General Assembly of the Church of Scotland
