= Arthur Wallace Pickard-Cambridge =

British classical scholar (1873–1952)

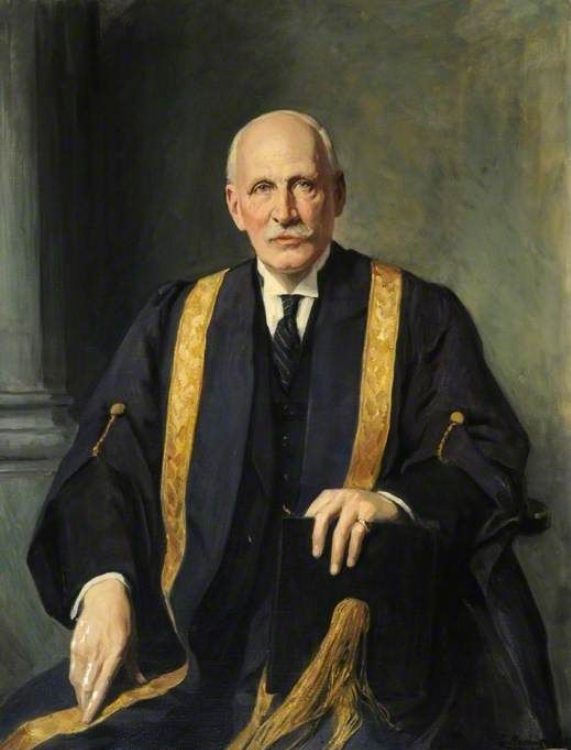
1938 portrait by George Harcourt

Sir Arthur Wallace Pickard-Cambridge, FBA (20 January 1873 – 7 February 1952) was a British classicist, Professor of Greek at the University of Edinburgh, and one of the greatest authorities on the theatre of ancient Greece in the first half of the 20th century.

Pickard-Cambridge was born in Bloxworth Rectory, the son of the Reverend Octavius Pickard-Cambridge (1828–1917), a naturalist and entomologist.

Between 1897 and 1929, he served as a fellow and tutor at Balliol College, Oxford and at Worcester College, Oxford, where his pupils included James William Webb-Jones.

Following the accidental death (in a fire) of Prof. Alexander William Mair he became Professor of Greek at the University of Edinburgh (1928-1930), then Vice-chancellor of Sheffield University (1930 to 1938). He was elected a fellow of the British Academy in 1934, and was knighted in 1950 "for services to education", just two years before his death.

== Quotations ==
I rank examinations as they are treated in most schools as among the worst enemies to education, to freedom of thought, and independence of judgment.

—Letter to the Daily Mirror 1935

Everything is done for us nowadays: we have lost our independence of thought. On every side we see men like sheep taking passively what is given to them.. getting even their standard of taste from the radio in this 'Switch it on' and 'Put me through' age.

—Address to the Congress of Universities of the British Empire, 1936

== Works ==
- 1912. The Public Orations of Demosthenes. Translated by A. W. Pickard-Cambridge. In two volumes. Oxford: Clarendon Press.
- 1914. Demosthenes and the Last Days of Greek Freedom 384-322 BC. New York and London: G.P. Putnams.
- 1918. Memoir of the Reverend Octavius Pickard-Cambridge. Published privately.
- 1927. Dithyramb, Tragedy and Comedy. Oxford: Clarendon Press. 2nd ed., 1962.
- 1927. Dithyramb, Tragedy and Comedy. Oxford: Clarendon Press.
- 1946. The Theatre of Dionysus in Athens. Oxford: Clarendon Press. 2nd ed., 1956.
- 1953. The Dramatic Festivals of Athens. Oxford: Clarendon Press. 2nd ed., 1988, ISBN 0-19-814258-7.

== Notes ==
Academic offices
Preceded by William Henry Hadow	Vice-Chancellor of the University of Sheffield; 1930–1938	Succeeded by Irvine Masson
