= Andrew Wilson (zoologist) =

Scottish zoologist, physiologist and author (1852–1912)

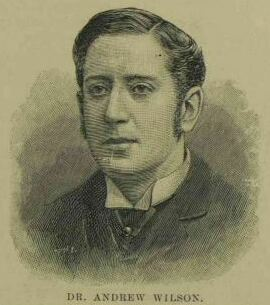
Dr. Andrew Wilson, ca. 1892. Author of the Science Jottings column of the Illustrated London News

Dr Andrew Wilson FRSE (30 September 1852–25 August 1912) was a 19th/20th century Scottish zoologist, physiologist and author.

== Life ==
Wilson was born in Edinburgh on 30 September 1852, the son of Francis Wilson and Margaret Wilson, née Spears (1810–1883). He appears to have been the great nephew of the Edinburgh zoologist James Wilson. He was educated at Dollar Academy then the Royal High School, Edinburgh. He studied science and medicine at the University of Edinburgh, graduating with an MB around 1872.

At the University of Edinburgh he was both the Combe lecturer and Gilchrist lecturer at the Royal College of Surgeons of Edinburgh, covering zoology and comparative anatomy. He lived the last 20 years of his life at 110 Gilmore Place in south-west Edinburgh.

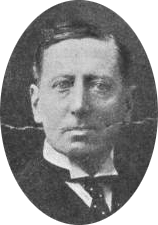
Dr. Andrew Wilson, in 1909

In 1879 he was elected a Fellow of the Royal Society of Edinburgh. His proposers were John Young, Alexander Dickson, John Gray McKendrick and John Hutton Balfour.

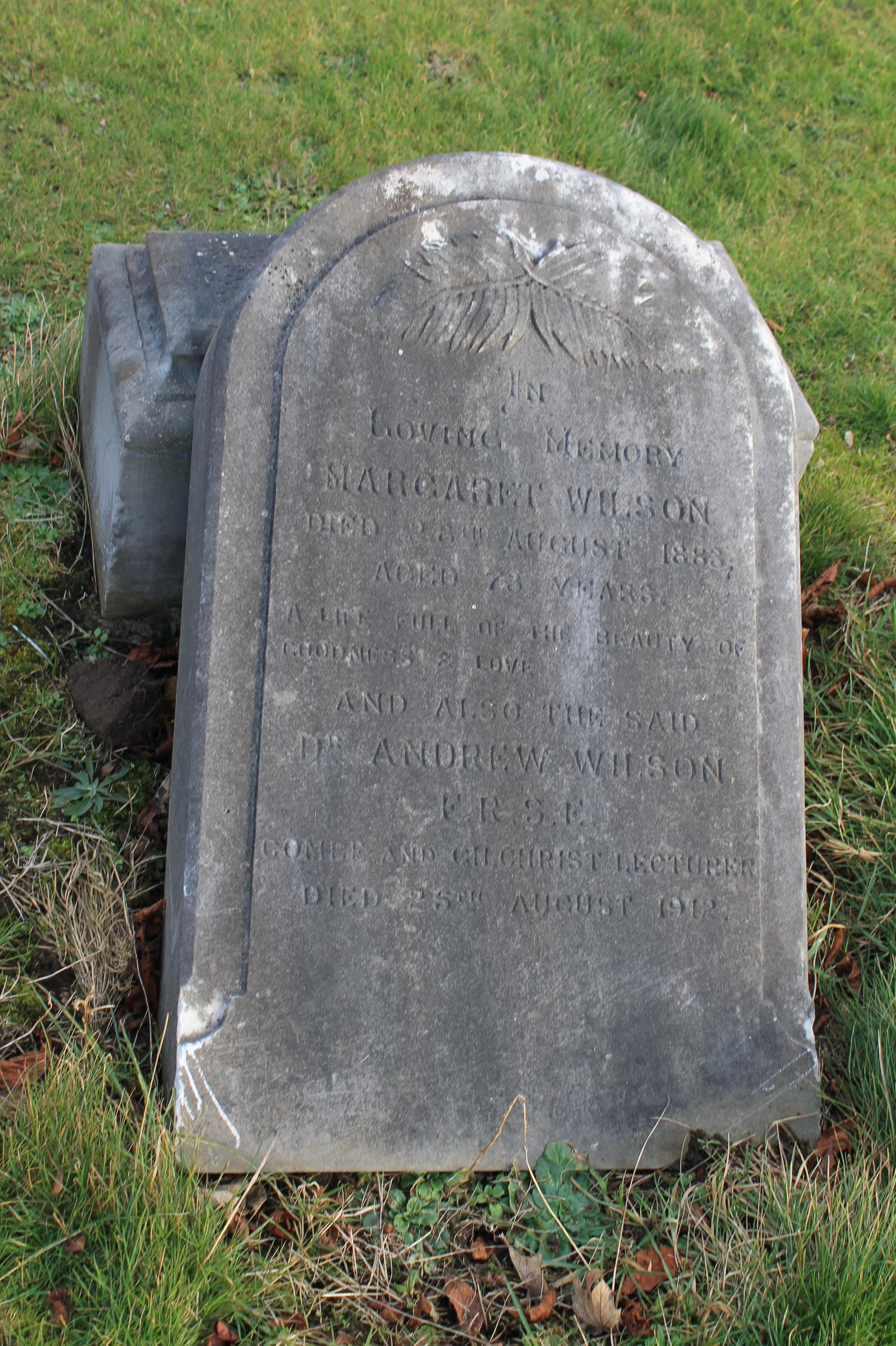
The grave of Andrew Wilson FRSE Morningside Cemetery

He died on 25 August 1912 North Berwick of heart disease. He is buried with his mother in Morningside Cemetery, Edinburgh. His grave lies in the southmost row, east of the southern entrance.

== Publications ==
- Elements of Zoology (1873)
- Sketches of Animal Life and Habits (1877)
- Leisure Time Studies (1879)
- Leaves from a Naturalist's Handbook (1882)
- Facts and Fictions of Zoology (1882)
- Chapters on Evolution (1883)
- Nature Studies (1883)
- Wild Animals and Birds (1884)
- Science and Crime (1887)
- Science and Poetry (1888)
- Glimpses of Nature (1891)
- Studies in Life and Sense (1898)
- The Light Side of Science (1898)
- Brain and Body (1900)
- How to Keep Well (1907)
- Physiology (1910)
- The Modern Physician (1910)

He was a contributor to the 9th edition of Encyclopedia Britannica
