= Alexander William Mair =

Scottish scholar of Greek (1875–1928)

Alexander William Mair (9 June 1875 – 13 November 1928) was a 20th century Scottish scholar who was the Professor of Greek at the University of Edinburgh. He was an authority on the works of the Greek poet Hesiod.

== Life ==
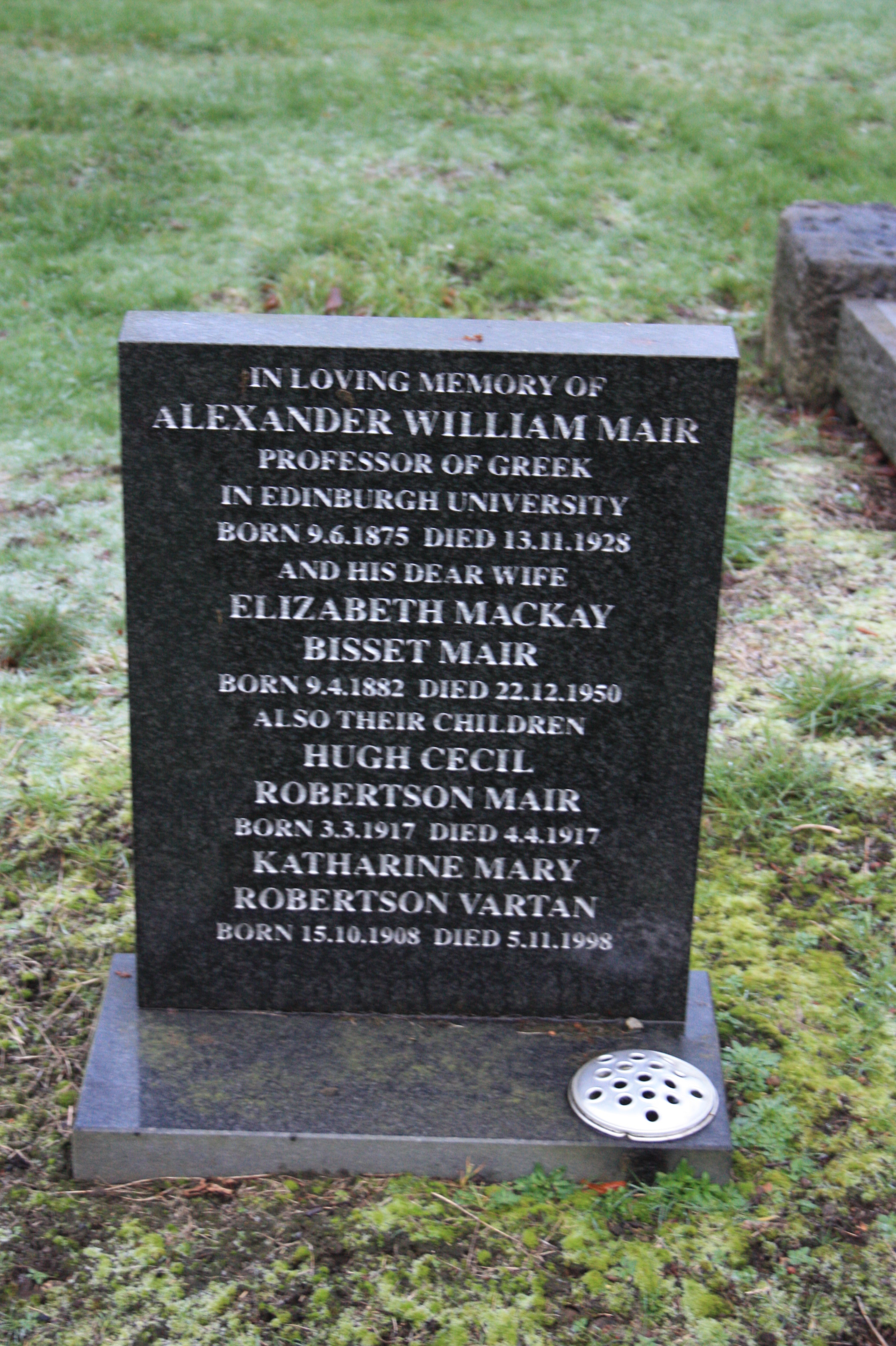
The grave of Alexander William Mair, Morningside Cemetery

Mair was born in Edinburgh on 9 June 1875, the son of Rev Alexander Mair of the United Presbyterian Church. The family lived at 7 Abbotsford Park in the Morningside district. He studied Classics at the University of Cambridge.

In 1899/1900 his father served as the final Moderator of the General Assembly of the United Presbyterian Church.

He was a Fellow of Gonville and Caius College, Cambridge.

In 1908 he took up the position of professor of Greek at the University of Edinburgh, succeeding Samuel Henry Butcher.

He died in a house fire at his home, 9 Corennie Drive, in Morningside, Edinburgh on 13 November 1928, in his study. He is buried in Morningside Cemetery, Edinburgh.

After his death, his position at the university was filled by Arthur Wallace Pickard-Cambridge.

== Family ==
Mair married Elizabeth Mackay Bisset (1882-1950). Together they had 13 children including: Gilbert Mair (the oldest), Gwen, Eileen, Enid, Colin, Hugh (died in infancy) Katharine (1908-1998) and the rugby player Norman Mair (the youngest).

== Publications ==
- Hesiod: The Poems and Fragments (1908)
- Callimachus and Lycophron (1921)
- Poems by Alexander william Mair (1929)
- Works and Days
- Fragments and the Shield of Herakles
- Fragments and Theogony
- Oppian, Colluthus, and Tryphiodorus (Loeb Classical Library 219)
