= Isabella Pringle =

Ella Pringle FRCPE
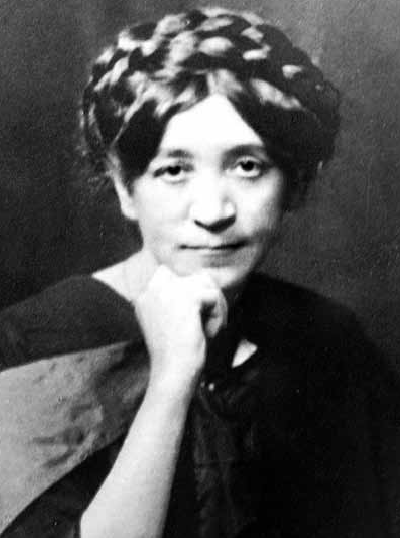
- Ella Ferrier Pringle in 1909
- Born: Isabella Ferrier Pringle; 1 December 1876; Edinburgh, Scotland
- Died: 27 May 1963 (aged 86); Edinburgh, Scotland
- Education: University of Edinburgh
- Occupations: medical missionary, physician
- Known for: Second female Fellow of the Royal College of Physicians of Edinburgh
- Medical career
- Field: child health

Isabella "Ella" Ferrier Pringle FRCPE (1 December 1876 – 27 May 1963) was the second woman to be elected a Fellow of the Royal College of Physicians of Edinburgh (RCPE), in 1929. She practised as a medical missionary in Manchuria before a pioneering career in child health. In official documents she is referred to as Dr I. F. Pringle.

== Biography ==
Isabella Pringle was born on 1 December 1876 in Edinburgh, Scotland, the daughter of Andrew Pringle and his wife, Isabella Barbour.

She worked as a typist until the age of 29, and then entered the University of Edinburgh to study medicine. She received her MBChB in 1909. She worked as a United Free Church of Scotland medical missionary in Manchuria until ill-health forced her to return to Scotland in 1916.

She then studied for a Diploma in Public Health, and in 1917 was appointed the assistant medical officer for Paisley. In 1919, she became the first full-time female medical officer with responsibility for maternity and child health. From 1921 to 1941, Pringle worked in Edinburgh as the senior assistant medical officer, and by the end of her tenure in the role she had developed a complete child welfare and maternity service.

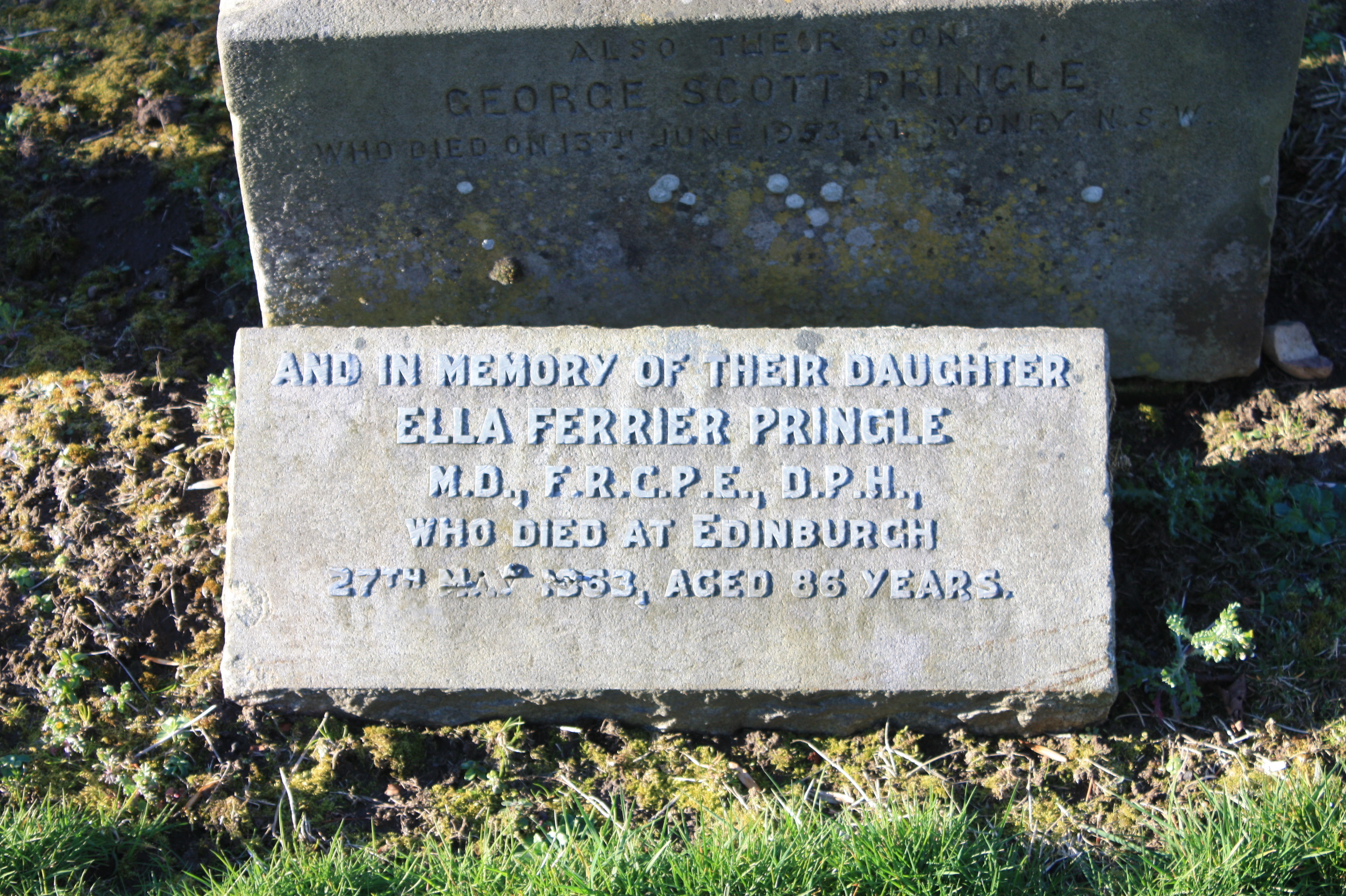
The grave of Isabella Ferrier Pringle, Morningside Cemetery, Edinburgh

She received her doctorate (MD) in 1921 and took the MRCPEd examinations in 1925; she was only the second woman to pass this examination. She was the second female elected as a Fellow of the Royal College of Physicians of Edinburgh in 1929.

She died on 27 May 1963. She is buried with her parents in Morningside Cemetery, Edinburgh. The grave is marked by a simple stone and lies near the war memorial in the north-east section of the cemetery.
