= Alexander Mair (minister) =

Scottish minister of the United Presbyterian Church

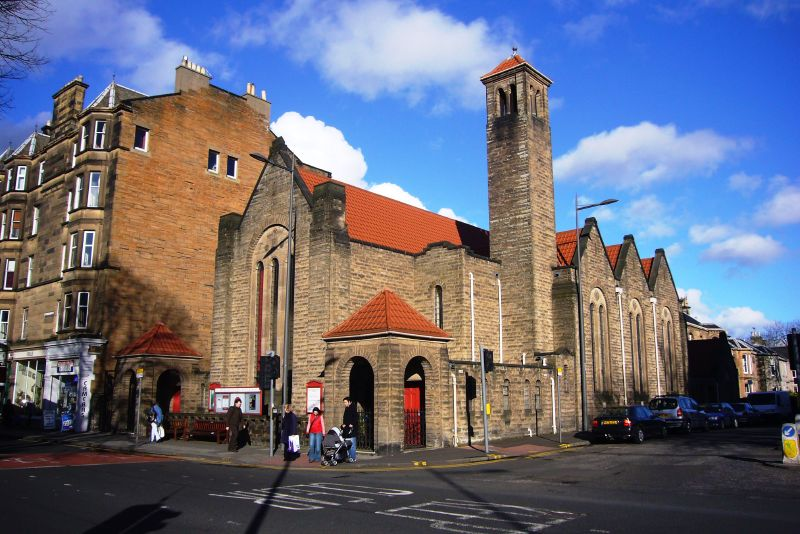
North Morningside UP Church

Alexander Mair (1834–1911) was a Scottish minister of the United Presbyterian Church who served as its final Moderator in 1899/1900.

== Life ==
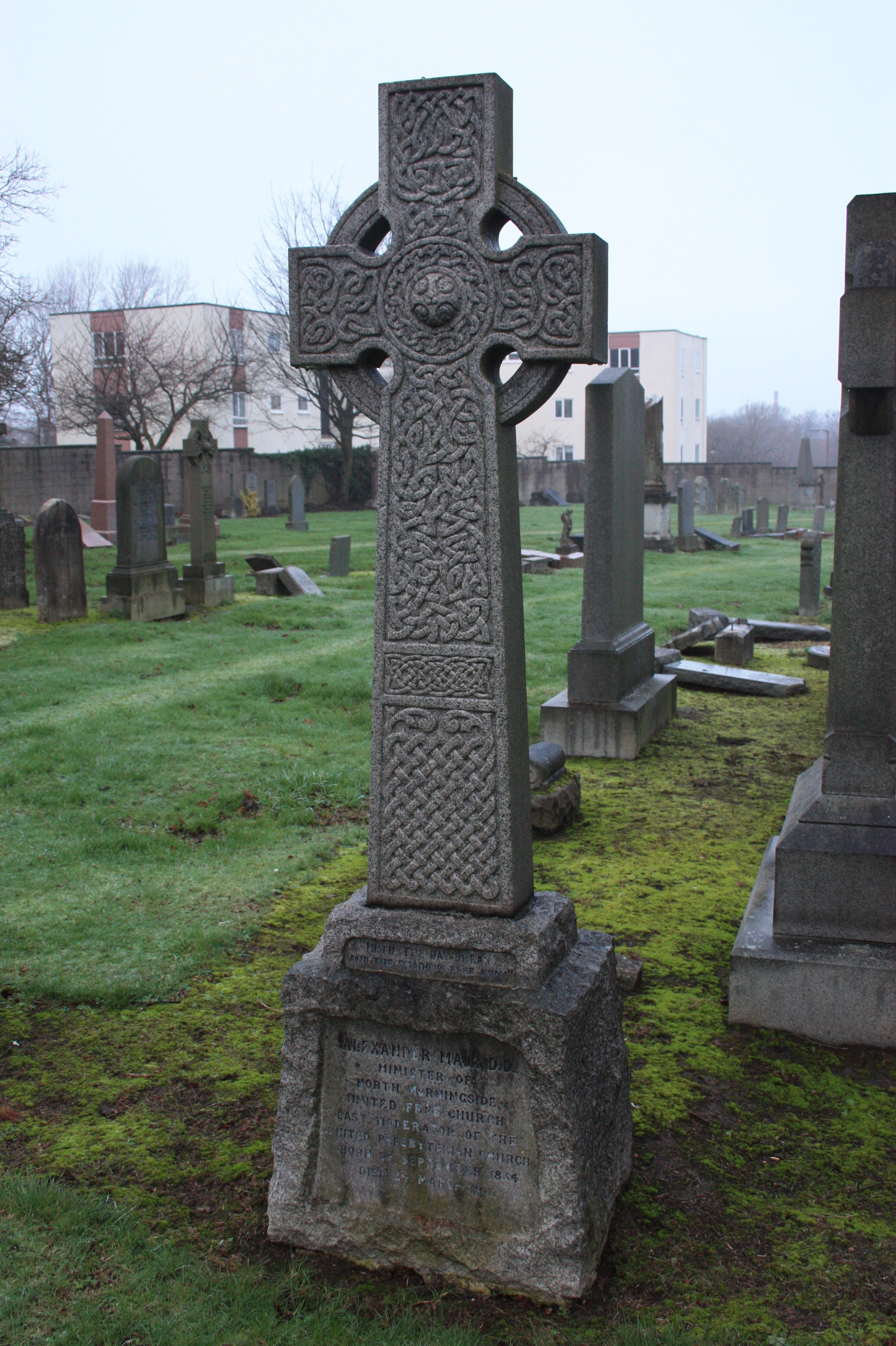
The grave of Rev Alexander Mair, Morningside Cemetery

He was born in Scotland on 20 September 1834. He is thought to be the grandson of Col Alexander Mair, Deputy Governor of Fort George, living at 8 Abercromby Place in Edinburgh in 1834. Col Mair was from a family of ministers.

He trained as a minister at Theological Hall 1856 to 1859 and joined the United Presbyterian Church.

In the 1870s he was living at 7 Abbotsford Park in Morningside, Edinburgh.

In 1875 Mair wrote, "Was the Lord's Supper Instituted with Wine? Answered in the Affirmative."

In 1879 he took over the ministry of the newly built North Morningside United Presbyterian Church at Holy Corner.

In 1899/1900 he was the church's final Moderator of the General Assembly before it merged with the Free Church of Scotland to create the United Free Church of Scotland. He was then a minister of the United Free Church until death.

In later life he moved to 25 Greenhill Gardens.

He died on 24 March 1911. He is buried in Morningside Cemetery, Edinburgh. The grave is marked by a granite Celtic cross.

== Family ==
He was married to Margaret McIntosh.

He was father to the classic scholar Alexander William Mair, grandfather to Norman Mair.
