= Thomas P. Marwick =

Scottish architect (1854–1927)

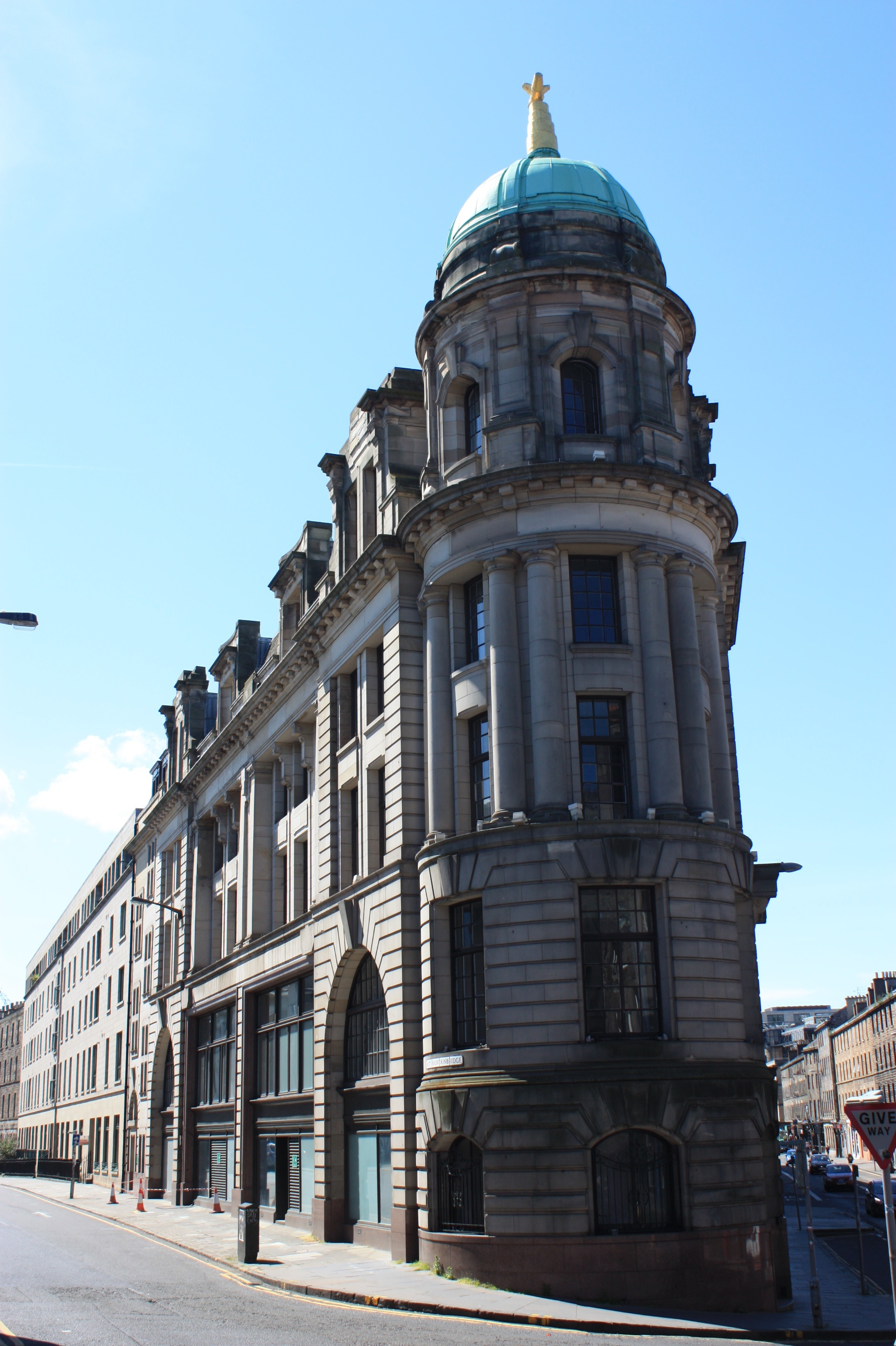
The Point Hotel, Edinburgh by Thomas P. Marwick

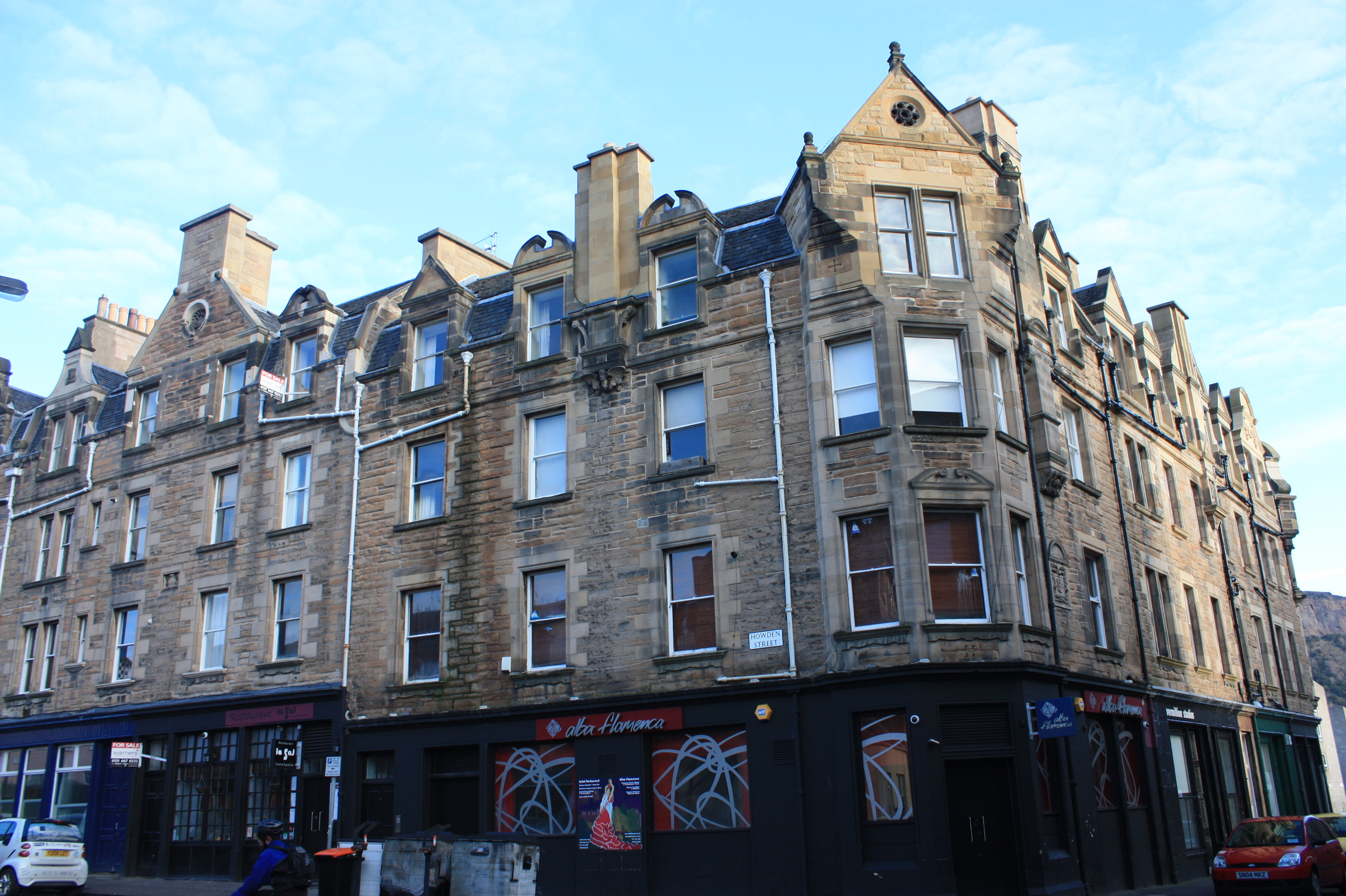
Fisher Buildings, Howden Street by T P Marwick

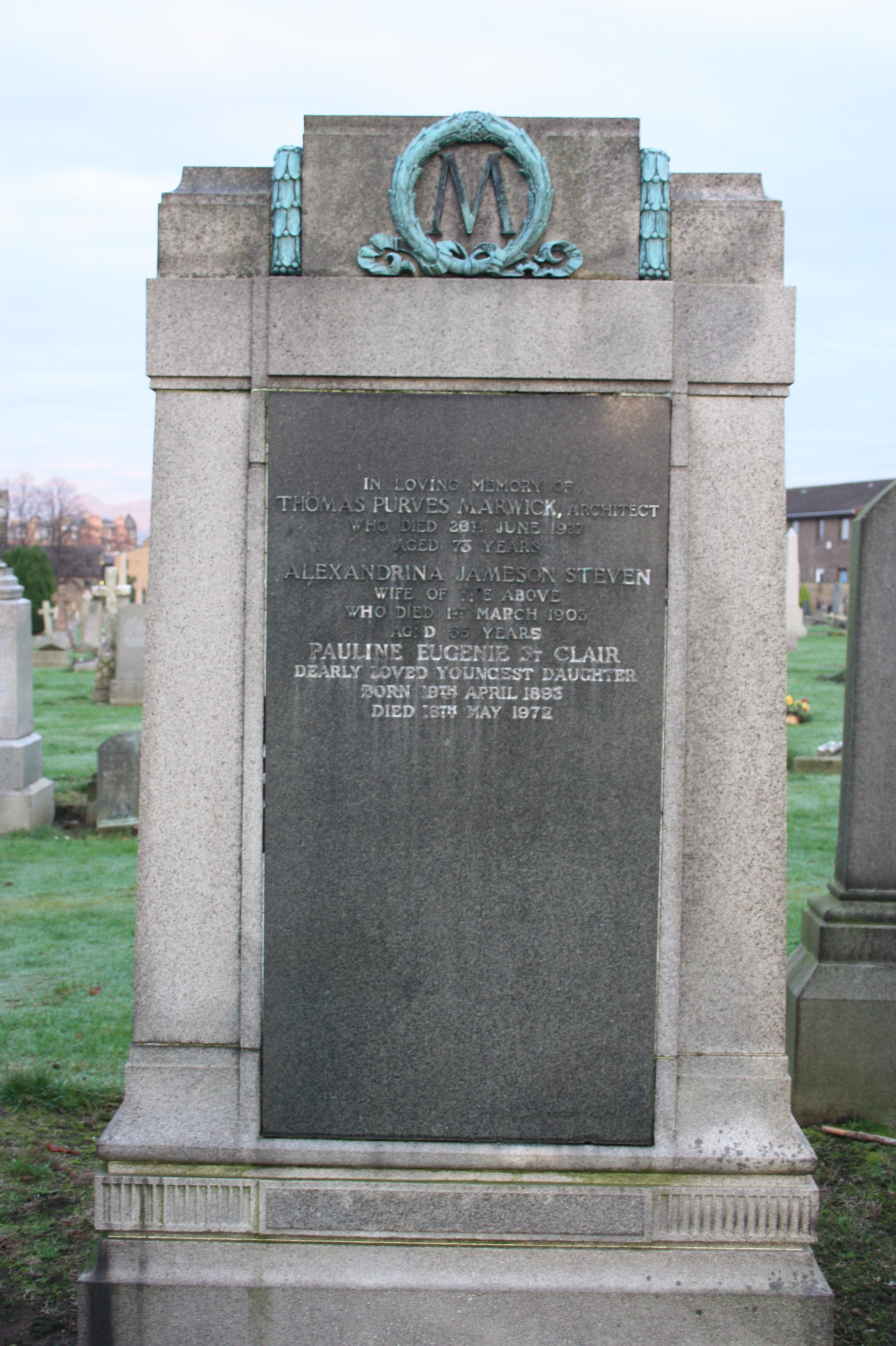
The grave of T P Marwick, Morningside Cemetery, Edinburgh

Thomas Purves Marwick (1854 – 26 June 1927) was a Scottish architect based in Edinburgh operating in the late 19th and early 20th century. He specialised in buildings in the Free Renaissance and Neo-Baroque styles and is particularly important to the architectural character of the Marchmont area.

== Life ==
He was born on 25 March 1854 the third son of William Marwick of Kirkwall on Orkney, and his wife, Agnes Purves.

He was educated in Edinburgh, Marwick served his architectural apprenticeship with Peddie and Kinnear. In 1882 he won the Ashpitel Prize and in 1884 won the RIBA silver medal for an essay on staircase design. His high marks on his entrance exam to the RIBA in 1882 won the praise of both Alfred Waterhouse and Sir Horace Jones.

He began independent practice around 1879, operating from his own home at 1 Spottiswoode Street, Edinburgh. His early work at Bruntsfield Place from 1885 was of exceptional quality and gained him a high reputation.

In 1900 his office was at 43 York Place and he was living in the Grange at 43 Lauder Road.

He was president of the Edinburgh Architectural Association from 1918 to 1921 and president of the Royal Incorporation of Architects in Scotland from 1922 to 1924.

In 1917 he took his son, Thomas Craigie Marwick, into his firm, creating T P Marwick and Son. In the same year he was made Assistant Master of the Merchants Company of Edinburgh.

Marwick died at home, 36 West Mayfield on 26 June 1927 and is buried in Morningside Cemetery in south Edinburgh, towards the south-west, with his wife, Alexandrina Jameson Steven (d.1903). Other members of the Marwick family lie to his south side.

His grandson, Thomas Waller Marwick (b.1903 – July 1971), also became an architect and is notable for an early curtain-wall building on Bread Street in Edinburgh (1937).

== Principal works ==
- Tenement, 36-41 Warrender Park Terrace (1880)
- Tenement, 45-49 Warrender Park Road (1881)
- Tenement, 330 Lawnmarket (1883)
- Tenements, 2-24 Howden Street (Fishers Buildings), Edinburgh (1885-8)
- Tenements, 1-19 Barclay Place (the end of Bruntsfield Place) (1885)
- Tenement, 44-48 High Street (Royal Mile), Edinburgh (1887)
- Tenement, 30-38 Marchmont Road (1888)
- Tenement, 19-25 St Marys Street, Edinburgh (1889)
- Large ornate tenements, 1-12 Barclay Terrace (1890)
- The Kenilworth Bar, Rose Street (1893)
- Royal Bank of Scotland, corner of Palmerston Place and West Maitland Street (1894)
- Royal Bank of Scotland offices, corner of Hill Place and Nicolson Street (1898-1902)
- Theatre/skating rink on St Stephen Street (latterly Cinderella Rockefella – now demolished) (1899-1901)
- Livingstone Institute for the Edinburgh Medical Missionary Society, Cowgate (1902)
- Royal Bank of Scotland, 177 Portobello High Street, (1904)
- 47-77 Bread Street, Edinburgh (1907)
- Slaughterhouses, New Market Road ("modern yet monumental") (1909)
- Alterations to Whitefoord House and Callander House, for Scottish Veterans Home, Canongate (1912-3)
- Corner block Bread Street/East Fountainbridge (now the Point Hotel) (1914)
