= Hannah MacGoun =

Scottish artist (1864–1913)

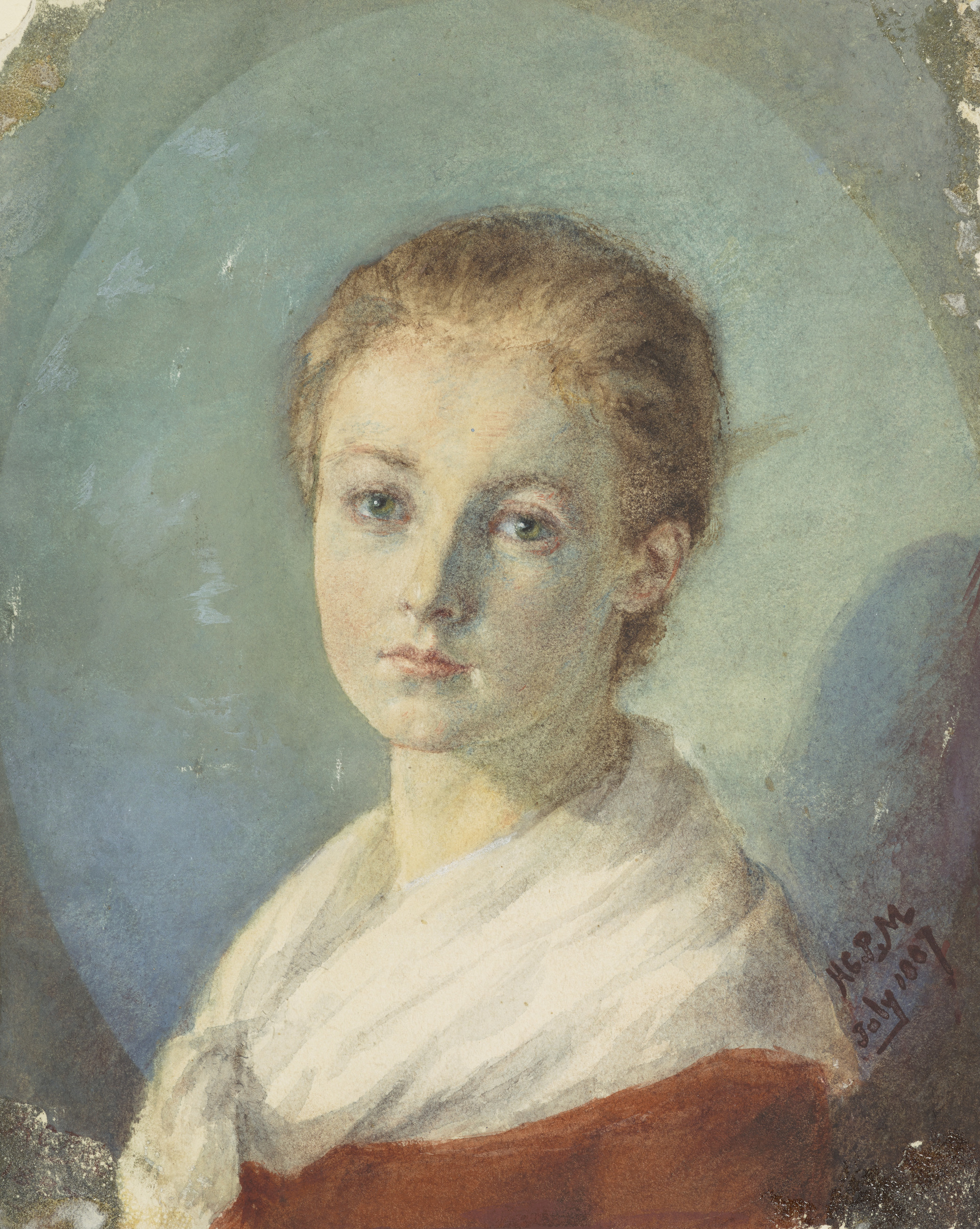
Self-portrait, 1887, Scottish National Portrait Gallery

Hannah Clarke Preston MacGoun RSW (1864–1913) was a Scottish artist and the first female to be elected a member of the Royal Society of Watercolourists. Stylistically she was termed a "social realist". As an illustrator she assumed the gender neutral name of H. C. Preston MacGoun.

== Life ==
She was born in Edinburgh the youngest daughter of six children to the Rev. Robert William MacGoun (1813–1871) minister of Morningside Parish Church. and his wife Isabella Clarke of Comrie. Her father died when she was 7 years old and she moved with her mother and siblings to 5 Banner Place in Morningside.

She studied art at the Trustees Academy on Picardy Place in Edinburgh. She then did a study tour of Germany and Holland. She then began work, both as a book illustrator (specialising in children's books), and selling various small genre scenes.

She had a working relationship with Thomas Noble Foulis an Edinburgh printer and publisher.

In 1903 she was elected a member of the Royal Society of Watercolourists.

By 1910 her success was so great she had opened a studio at 130 George Street, Edinburgh - a prestigious address in the city centre.

She died at home at 69 Morningside Road on 20 August 1913 is buried in Morningside Cemetery, Edinburgh not far from the grave of Thomas Foulis.

== Public artworks ==
- Her self-portrait of 1887 is in the Scottish National Portrait Gallery.
- "St Andrews Fisherfolk" (in oils) and "Cupid" are held at the City Art Centre, Edinburgh

== Books illustrated ==
- The Joys of Friendship the Joyous Life Series, published by Le Roy Phillips in Boston
- At the Turn of the Year by Fiona MacLeod published by Thomas N Foulis in Edinburgh
- Rob Lindsay and his School
- Pet Marjorie by John Brown, published By Thomas Noble Foulis
- The Little Book of Children by John Brown, published by Thomas Noble Foulis
- Little Miss Conceit by Ellinor Davenport Adams
