= T. N. Foulis =

British publishing firm

- Status: Defunct
- Founded: 1903
- Founder: Thomas Noble Foulis
- Country of origin: United Kingdom
- Headquarters location: Edinburgh
- Publication types: Poetry, prose, gift books and nonfiction

T. N. Foulis was a British publisher founded in Edinburgh in 1903. During its first ten years, the firm became well known for producing "highly original, beautifully illustrated books", with contributions by "artists of considerable merit" such as Jessie M. King, H. M. Brock, Hannah MacGoun and Walter Crane. Works published included classics of poetry and prose, gift books, and nonfiction books, many with a Scottish theme.

== Company history ==
T. N. Foulis was established by Thomas Noble Foulis (1874-1943) in 1903. He was from a long line of publishers: his father Thomas Foulis was a partner in the Edinburgh publishers "Douglas & Foulis". His ancestors included Robert Foulis (printer).

His brother Douglas A. Foulis joined the firm in 1907 and was a partner from 1910 to 1919. The head office was located at 12 Frederick Street, Edinburgh and later a second office was opened in Paternoster Row, London, E.C.

The firm published more than 400 books in the years 1903–24. Its books were "produced to the most exacting of standards". In its 1913 catalogue, the firm announced:

Each Foulis book is the particular outcome of much personal thought and consideration. The more mechanical methods of modern publishing, which pours out wholesale, indiscriminately bound, or with featureless uniformity, have no attraction for Mr. Foulis and his fellow craftsmen.

According to Ian Elfick and Paul Harris, the physical characteristics of a typical Foulis book would include coloured buckram bindings, rose watermarked paper with rough cut edges, text printed in the elegant Auriol font, and illustrations in the form of tipped-in colour plates. Most titles were bound in "paper boards, which was actually wallpaper, dyed to Foulis' own specifications" and the more expensive titles were bound in a "a special jute buckram from Dundee or with fine quality vellum".

The firm encountered financial difficulties during the First World War. In 1916 T. N. Foulis absorbed most of the publications of the Edinburgh publishing firm Douglas & Foulis.

In 1924 T. N. Foulis was taken over by G. T. Marshall, a printer in Henley-on-Thames in Oxfordshire. The resulting firm, trading as G. T. Foulis & Co., was based at 7 Milford Lane, Strand, London, W.C.2 and published books on motoring. The firm continued as Hunter and Foulis in the 1950s. That firm was in turn taken over by the Haynes Publishing Group which publishes the Haynes Owner's Workshop Manuals and in the years 1976-2000 issued the Foulis Motoring Book series.

A collection of approximately 400 titles, described as "exquisitely designed, charmingly illustrated, beautifully printed, and yet reasonable affordable books", are held in the T. N. Foulis Collection at the Mitchell Library, Glasgow.

== Envelope Books ==
In 1907 T. N. Foulis launched a gift booklet series of poetry known as Envelope Books. The least expensive titles in this series were intended to substitute for Christmas cards. They included a "Christmas greetings page and had flexible card covers". They were sold in wrappers which could be folded into an envelope which could then be sent by post. More expensive titles were bound in cloth or in limp velvet (calf suede) yapp and came with "mounted illustrations".

Colour plate illustrations and cover designs were provided by eminent artists who were active at the turn of the century, including Jessie M. King, William Russell Flint, Frank Brangwyn, Frederick Cayley Robinson, William Hatherell, Harry Rountree, Annie French, Katharine Cameron and Maurice Greiffenhagen.

== Book series ==
- The Anecdote Books
- The Arts and Crafts of Nations
- The Cities Series
- The Complete Works of Friedrich Nietzsche
- Doctor John Brown Series
- Envelope Books
- Foulis Books
- Foulis Fiction Series
- Friendship Booklets
- Grey Old Gardens Series
- Holyrood Books series
- The Iona Books
- The Joyous Life Series
- Leaves of Life Series
- The Legends of the Flowers (1st Series, etc.)
- The Life and Character Series
- Library of English Prose
- Little Prose Masterpieces
- Literary Memoir series
- London Booklets
- Maxims of Life Series
- Les Petits Livres d'Or
- Problems of Today Series (also known as: Tracts for the Time Series)
- Northern Numbers (1st Series; etc.)
- Old Scottish Churches series
- Persian Poets
- Queens of Beauty and Romance
- Rab and His Friends (implicit series of dog stories featuring Rab and his friends)
- Romantic Lives Series
- Rose Garden Series
- Rose of Sharon booklets
- Roses of Parnassus
- Scottish Life & Character series
- Spirit of the Age Series
- The World of Art Series

Further book series are listed at Foulis, T N.
