= John Michael Dewar =

Scottish gynaecologist and ornithologist

Dr John Michael Dewar MD FRSE FRCPE (1883 – 24 May 1941) was a Scottish gynaecologist and ornithologist specialising in diving birds and waders. In publication he is usually referred to as J. M. Dewar.

== Life ==
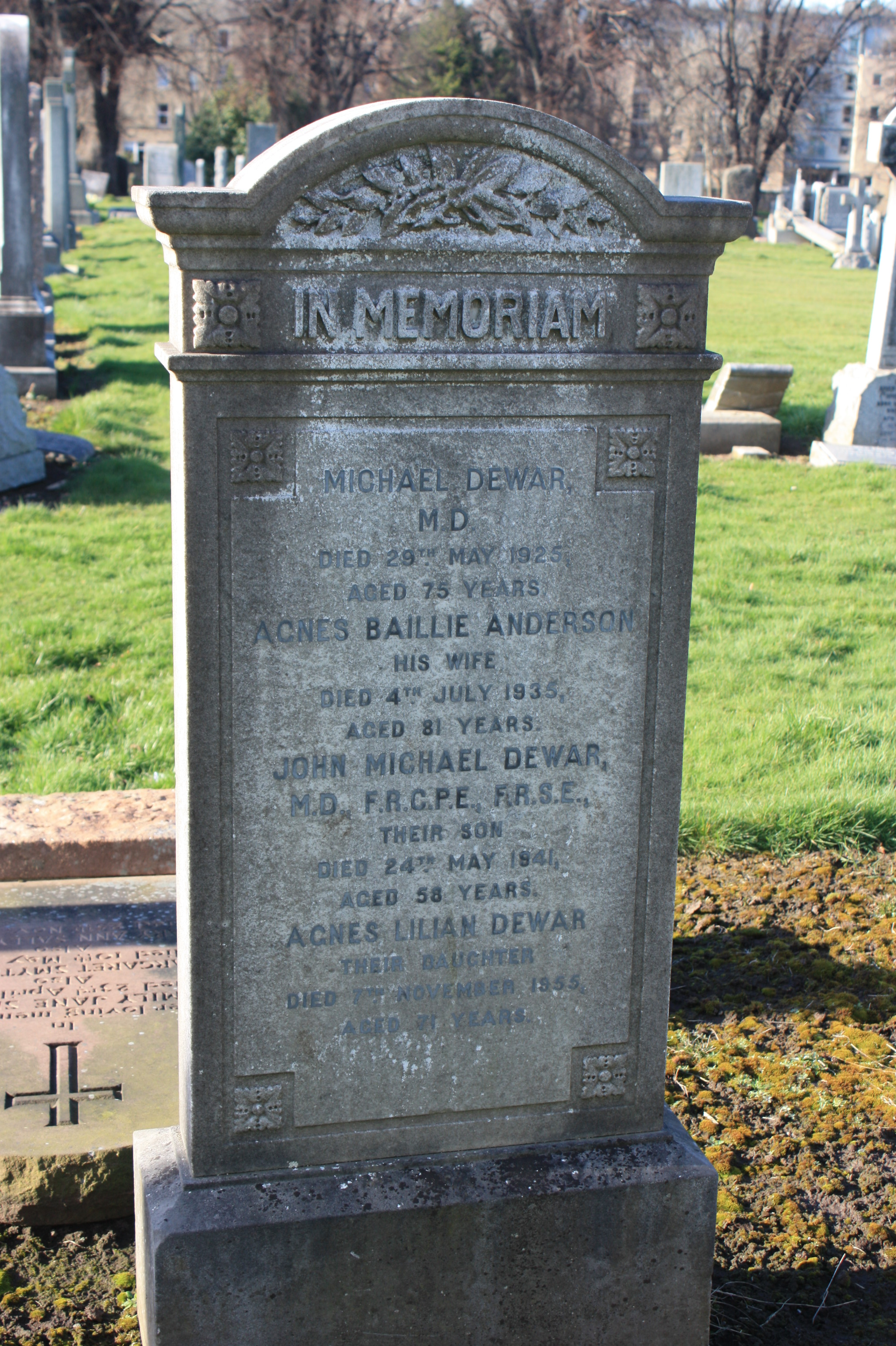
The grave of Dr John Michael Dewar, Morningside Cemetery, Edinburgh

He was the son of Agnes Baillie Anderson and her husband, Dr Michael Dewar (1850–1925). His early education was at George Watson's College. He studied medicine at the University of Edinburgh and graduated with an MB ChB in 1904, and gained an MD in 1914.

He made complex studies and calculations of the dives of diving birds to discover the co-relation between length of dive and depth reached. In 1912 he published papers on the evolution of wading birds, and in 1915 an important paper on sense of direction in birds, of much relevance to migration. At this time he lived at 24 Lauriston Place, a flat opposite the Edinburgh Royal Infirmary next to George Heriot’s School.

He was elected a Fellow of the Royal Society of Edinburgh in 1938. His proposers were Edwin Bramwell, James Ritchie, Charles Henry O'Donoghue, and William Thomas Ritchie.

He served as a Civilian Medical Officer to the Royal Air Force and at the outbreak of the Second World War was co-opted as Assistant Physician to Edinburgh Royal Infirmary.

He died on 24 May 1941. He is buried with his parents and sister in Morningside Cemetery in southern Edinburgh. The grave lies on the southern edge, slightly east of the south entrance.

== Publications ==
- The Bird as a Diver (1924)
- Timing the Underwater Activity of Diving Birds
- Dictionary of the Habits and Behaviours of Birds (1941-unpublished)
